= 2nd Canadian Regiment =

Quebec volunteers infantry unit, 1776–1783

- Flag purported to be that of the regiment
- Active: 20 January 1776–15 November 1783
- Allegiance: Second Continental Congress of the United States
- Type: Infantry
- Size: 1,000 authorized
- Part of: Continental Army
- Nicknames: Congress's Own, Hazen's Regiment
- Motto: Pro aris et focis
- Colors: Brown and Yellow stripes
- Engagements: American Revolutionary War: Battle of Staten Island; Battle of Brandywine; Battle of Germantown; Siege of Yorktown

Commanders
- Notable commanders: Moses Hazen

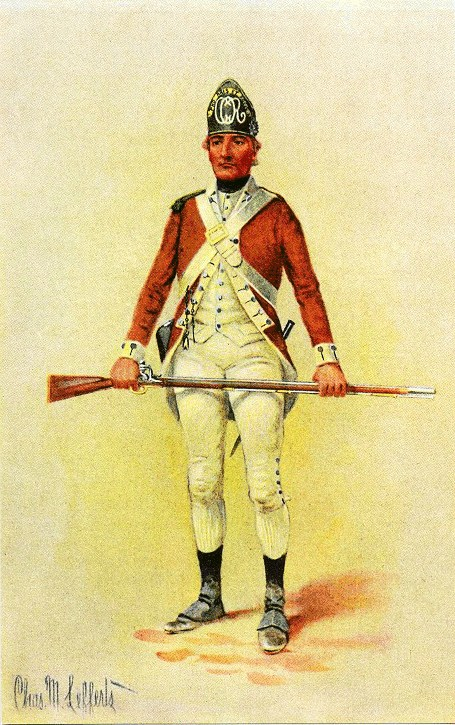
Watercolor drawing, by Charles M. Lefferts, depicting the 2nd Canadian Regiment, Continental Line, uniform

The 2nd Canadian Regiment (1776–1783), also known as Congress's Own or Hazen's Regiment, was an Extra Continental regiment of the American Patriots' Continental Army, consisting primarily of volunteers from the Province of Quebec. It was authorized on January 20, 1776 under the command of Colonel Moses Hazen. All or part of the regiment saw action at Staten Island, Brandywine, Germantown and the Siege of Yorktown. Most of its non-combat time was spent in and around New York City as part of the forces monitoring the British forces occupying that city. The regiment was disbanded on November 15, 1783 at West Point, New York.

The regiment was one of a small number of Continental Army regiments that was the direct responsibility of the Continental Congress (most regiments were funded and supplied by a specific state). Commanded by Colonel (later Brigadier General) Moses Hazen for its entire existence, the regiment was originally made up of volunteers and refugees from Quebec who supported the rebel cause during the disastrous invasion of Canada. Hazen and his staff were later authorized by Congress to recruit in other areas to supplement their ranks.

== Origins ==
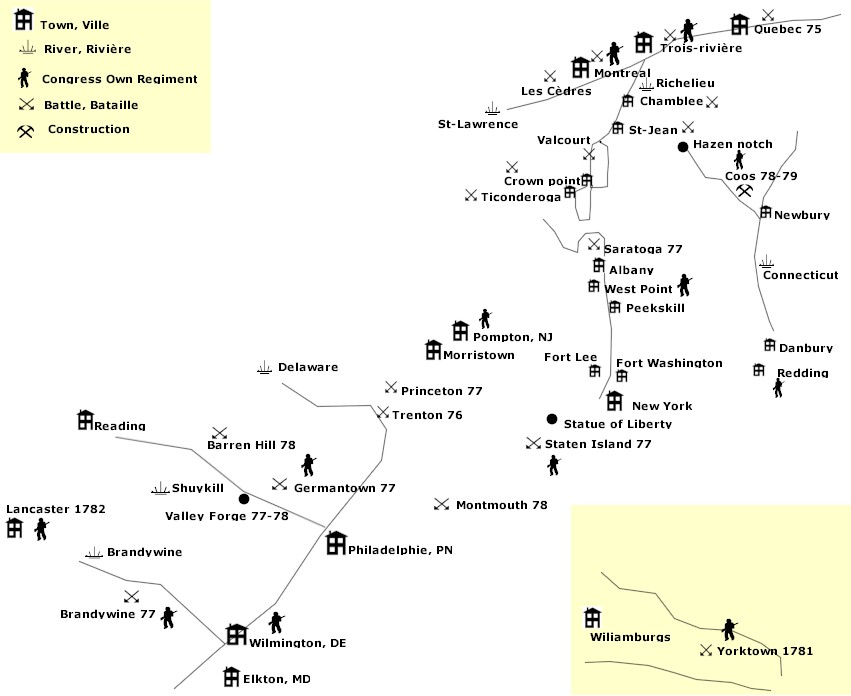
Movement of the COR Regiment

Late in 1775, Colonel James Livingston raised and commanded a regiment of Canadians that fought at St. Jean, Quebec, in support of General Montgomery's 1775 invasion of Quebec. Livingston's 300 Canadians, along with about 50 Americans, were instrumental in the fall of Fort Chambly during that engagement. Livingston's regiment, which was not formalized by Montgomery until November 1775, also participated in the action at Quebec. On January 3, 1776, Congress commissioned him Colonel, and his organization became known as the Canadian Regiment.

Moses Hazen had served as a lieutenant in the 44th Regiment during the French and Indian War and was receiving a half-pay pension for his British service. In 1775, while he was living on this plus the income from his estate in St. Jean, Quebec, the colonial army invaded. Nevertheless, Hazen was arrested by the British on suspicion of spying for the Americans. He was held a prisoner for 54 days, until he was finally released by General Montgomery after the fall of Montreal in November. Hazen then joined the American cause, and took part in the battle of Quebec. Following the American failure to take the city, Hazen and Edward Antill, an American expatriate, traveled to Philadelphia to report on the battle. Congress partially compensated Hazen by establishing the 2nd Canadian Regiment. He accepted the command, thus forfeiting his British half-pay. Antill was made lieutenant colonel of the regiment. Although John Duggan, one of Livingston's captains, had been promised a regiment by Benedict Arnold, Hazen and Antill reached Philadelphia before Duggan, and Hazen smeared his name in his effort to get command of the regiment.

On January 20, 1776, Congress authorized the 2nd Canadian Regiment with an allowed maximum strength of 1,000. It would consist of four battalions (5 companies each), the only oversized regiment in the Continental Army. It was assigned to the Army's Canadian Department, and was organized by Hazen on February 10, 1776, at Montreal, to be recruited from the Richelieu and St. Lawrence Valleys. Over the next two months, Hazen and Antill recruited in those areas, until early April, when the recruiting funds dried up, raising about 250 men.

During much of the war, the 2nd Canadian Regiment was known as Congress's Own Regiment, and Livingston's command continued to be known as the Canadian Regiment. Greatly depleted by its five years of service, Livingston's regiment was disbanded in the reorganization of the Continental Army on January 1, 1781. Its Canadian elements were assigned to Hazen's command, which was then redesignated as the Canadian Regiment.

== Montreal and retreat ==
The regiment was first assigned to garrison duty in and around Montreal, which was under Major General David Wooster's command. In March 1776, Wooster went to Quebec City to assume command of the army there; Hazen was temporarily placed in command of the forces at Montreal until Benedict Arnold arrived from Quebec in April. Arnold then assigned the regiment to guard duty at Fort Chambly, where it remained until the American retreat in June 1776.

On July 2, the Canadian Department was disbanded, and regiment was reassigned to the Northern Department. The regiment was at Fort Ticonderoga in July 1776, Albany in September, and then Fishkill, New York, for winter quarters. By the time the regiment reached Albany, its strength had dropped to about 100. On November 12, the regiment was assigned to the Highlands Department. It was reorganized on January 1, 1777, to consist of four battalions (20 companies), and Hazen was given permission to recruit "at large" – that is, he was allowed to recruit from any states, not just Quebec. These recruitment efforts met with mixed success, as most states had been assigned quotas for troop recruitment to fill their line companies, and thus preferred to have men enter those commands rather than Hazen's. On January 8, the regiment was assigned to the Main Army.

== New Jersey campaign ==
The regiment was at Princeton, New Jersey, as early as May 19, 1777, where it was assigned on May 22 to the 2nd Maryland Brigade of the Main Army. In early August the regiment, brigaded as part of General John Sullivan's Division, was encamped at Hanover, New Jersey. Several of the regiment's companies participated in the Battle of Staten Island on August 22, 1777. Its losses included 8 officers and 40 men, with the captured including Antill and Captain James Herron. Antill would not be exchanged until November 10, 1780.

25 August 1777 This Moment, while writing, Colo. Hazen showed Me a Letter, giving an account of an attempt by Gen. Sullivane on the Enemy on Staten Island last Thursday. One party under Colo. Ogden of 500, surprised the Enemy, killed a few, made 100 prisoners & returned. Sullivane commanded Deborres Brigade, he killed 5 & made 30 prisoners. Gen. Smallwood had no Luck. He was discovered & the Enemy escaped. So far Success. About 9 o'Clock the two Brigades joined, & began to cross at the old blazing Starr. Before all our Men got over, the Enemy came up & attacked 150 of our Men. Our People behaved bravely, drove the Enemy several Times, but were overpowered. We had but a few killed. We lost 130 privates prisoners. Colo. Antill, Major Woodson, Major Stewart, Major Tillard, Capt. Carlisle, & Duffee a Surgeons Mate are taken. Capt. Hoven, Lieut. Campbell, Lt. Anderson & Ensign Lee were not mentioned in the flagg & are suffered to be killed. Several Field & Commd. officers fell into our Hands. The above is the substance of the Letter.

— Samuel Chase to Thomas Johnson, August 25, 1777

== Philadelphia campaign ==
=== Battle of Brandywine ===
Sullivan's division then marched south to join Washington's army in the defense of Philadelphia. On September 11, 1777, a battalion of 200 of Hazen's men was sent a mile north of Jones's Ford to cover Wistar's Ford, and a second battalion of 200 men was posted at Buffington's Ford about a mile north of Wistar's Ford, situated just below the forks of the Brandywine Creek. Hazen's troops spotted British troops in a flanking maneuver and crossing the Brandywine River. They sent a report of this movement to George Washington, who initially did not believe this intelligence despite its corroboration by Lieutenant Colonel James Ross. The regiment lost 4 officers and 73 men in the battle.

=== Battle of Germantown ===
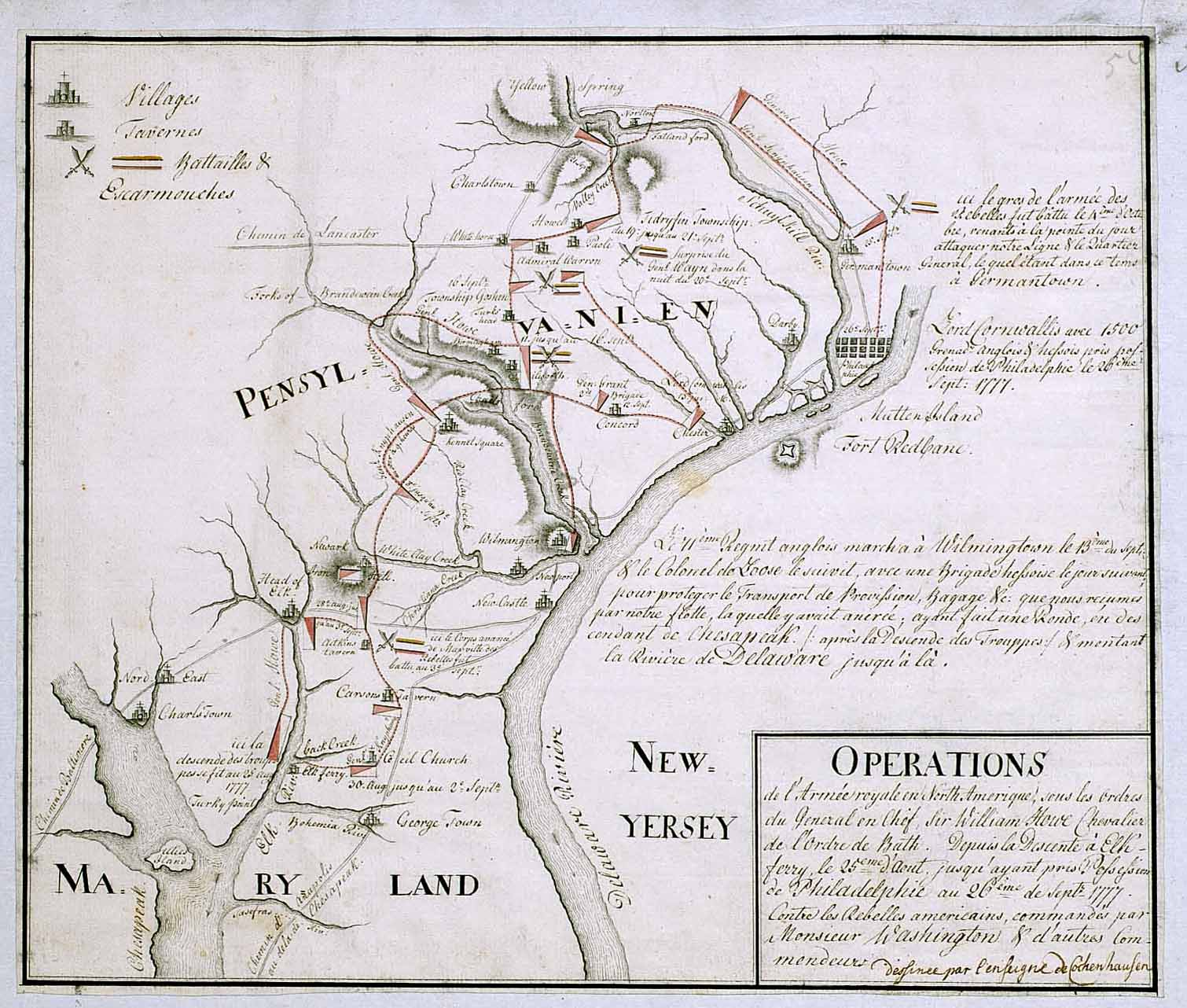
A period map showing the locations of the battles at Brandywine and Germantown.

Still under Sullivan's command, the regiment participated in the Battle of Germantown on October 4, 1777. The British were encamped at Germantown northwest of Philadelphia. On the evening of October 3 General Washington ordered his troops, encamped at Skippack Creek on the north side of the Schuylkill River, to march 17 miles (27 km) as part of a planned surprise attack on the British at daybreak. The Americans would then descend upon Germantown from the north in four columns, under the commands of Generals Sullivan, Greene, Armstrong and Smallwood, along four main roads leading into Germantown. The main effort of the advance was to be General Sullivan leading the column on the right and General Nathanael Greene on the left. Sullivan's column, with the Continental troops of his own division and others, was to advance down Germantown Road against Howe's center.

The regiment was part of the platoon of the advance party that first entered Germantown before the battle became general. Unbeknownst to Washington, the columns of Greene and Smallwood got lost. Washington himself accompanied Sullivan's force and, at 5 am, ordered him to launch the assault. The leading element of Sullivan's column, General Thomas Conway's brigade, attacked the British 2d Light Infantry battalion, which had been reinforced by the British 40th Regiment of Foot under command of Lieutenant-Colonel Thomas Musgrave. The regiment formed part of Sullivan's early attack on the British; its losses were 3 officers and 19 men.

=== Winter quarters 1777–1778 ===
On December 21, 1777, the regiment and a detachment of the Maryland Line under the command of General William Smallwood (the 2nd Maryland Brigade) arrived at Wilmington, Delaware, to protect the city from the British. They encamped at the present-day Brandywine Park in Wilmington. The highlight of this time included Smallwood's capture of the British armed brigantine Symmetry on December 30. This ship was laden with supplies, including winter clothing, en route to the British in Philadelphia.

== Activities on the northern front ==
=== New York and Connecticut ===
On January 24, 1778, Washington ordered Hazen's regiment to Albany, New York, transferring it from the 2nd Maryland Brigade to the Northern Department. The objective was a planned invasion of Quebec. Hazen was assigned to the deputy quartermaster's post for the expedition, which was anticipated to involve 2,500 men. The effort was troubled by supply and manpower difficulties, suspended in February, and then called off by Congress in March. The regiment was then reassigned to the Highlands Department on April 4 and ordered to West Point. The regiment was relieved July 22 from the Highlands Department and assigned to the New Hampshire Brigade, an element of the Main Army. In July 1778 the regiment was sent to White Plains to help guard New York City.

At White Plains, Hazen proposed a new potential invasion route to Quebec. This route went from Newbury in the New Hampshire Grants (present-day Vermont), where Hazen owned property, to Saint Francis, Quebec. On July 12, Hazen departed Newbury to scout the route. By July 25, he had returned to White Plains; the effort was abandoned for the time being because the manpower was needed in the New York area.

That summer, low manpower in Hazen's regiment caused Washington to consider disbanding it; the regiment's size had dropped to 522, and Washington was concerned over an excessively large number of officers (33) in the regiment. Hazen successfully argued for retention of the regiment, and noted that the large number of officers was needed because companies from the regiment were often detached to other units for service. During the autumn a large shipment of clothing and shoes arrived from France. After a lottery was held in October, Hazen's regiment were issued the uniform of brown coats faced with red.

In November, the regiment was ordered to Connecticut where it encamped at Redding for winter quarters. (Today, this is the site of Putnam Memorial State Park, where more than 100 piles of stone in the area of the park known as the "Encampment Site" are believed to mark the locations of the huts that sheltered troops from this and other regiments.) A weekly return for the brigade dated December 26, 1778, states that 162 men in the regiment were "unfit for duty for want of shoes."

=== Coös Country ===
In March 1779 the regiment was reassigned to the Northern Department, and marched to Springfield, Massachusetts. From Springfield they marched to Charlestown, New Hampshire and picked up clothing and supplies. They arrived in what was called the Coös Country of northern New Hampshire in May, and were tasked to build a road now known as the Bayley-Hazen Military Road from the Connecticut River to St. Jean, Quebec. Hazen had been secretly ordered to the area by Washington in April. Along with a large portion of Colonel Timothy Bedel's Regiment and Major Benjamin Whitcomb's New Hampshire rangers, they began to extend the road, a portion of which had been constructed in 1776 under the direction of Colonel Jacob Bayley.

Hazen's objective was to extend a road in a northwest direction following the general path of an old Cohâssiac Indian trail from Lower Coös to St. Johns, Quebec. The road cut through the heavily forested Upper Connecticut Valley in an area of the New Hampshire Grants that was then known as Upper Coös, but is today known as Vermont's Northeast Kingdom.

The village of Peacham became the base of operations for the military road project. The road actually started at the town of Wells River on the Connecticut River just north of Newbury. Blockhouses were built at Peacham, Cabot, Walden and Greensboro. Hazen made requisition upon the selectmen of the river towns to provide teams for the movement of his stores. Wells were dug at various points, swamps were bridged with logs and the road made passable for teams. Hazen encamped for some time on the present site of Lowell village, and he called the place "the camp at the end of the road", although the road's actual terminus was some miles further on.

The road crossed the Vermont Piedmont—rolling hills and valleys with isolated mountains. On June 22 it was reported that Hazen with half his men were within 40 miles (64 km) of St. John's. The regiment was recalled to the New York area in August; as a result, the road was never completed. A total of 54 miles (87 km) of road was built; the location where it ended is now known as Hazens Notch.

In the fall, Hazen leveled charges of corruption and mismanagement against Isaac Tichenor, the deputy commissioner of purchases at Coös, General Bayley, the deputy quartermaster-general, and Matthew Lyons, the deputy commissioner of issues. His regiment were poorly supplied the whole summer at Coös, supplies of beef arrived spoiled, and Hazen had to send his men into the fields to help with the harvest so they could eat. Courts-martial were later held.

=== Winter 1779–1780 Jockey Hollow ===
In October 1779 the regiment was ordered to Peekskill, New York, and on November 25 it was assigned to Hand's Brigade in the Main Army. They spent the winter at Morristown, New Jersey, where they experienced severe shortages of food. The site, known as "Jockey Hollow", is in the Morristown National Historical Park.

On January 14, 1780, the regiment participated in a "commando" raid of Staten Island planned in secrecy by General Washington and led by Lord Stirling. The object of the raid was a surprise attack on the enemy at the Watering Place Redoubts and to secure provisions. Preparations for the raid called for British attention to be focused on Irvine's detachment in the vicinity of Elizabethtown, while the 2nd Canadian marched to Connecticut Farms (present-day Union). Meanwhile, Steward's detachment would advance onto Staten Island, and Stirling's forces would then push to Richmond, in the center of Staten Island, where they would surprise enemy troops.

Lord Stirling had intelligence that the enemy had a force of about 1,000 men, with the main body in huts near the Watering Place Redoubts. These were three British circular redoubts, double-abatised, with about 200 men each, located at present-day Fort Hill Circle in St. George, just north of Tompkinsville. Around midnight on January 14, loaded with cannon and 1,500–3,000 troops, American forces crossed over the frozen ice of the Kill Van Kull waterway from Elizabethtown Point on 500 sleds. It was a starry night, and Loyalist spies had warned the British of the American approach. As a result, the Americans found the British on the posts and alert. With the element of surprise gone, and conditions extremely cold, the raid was aborted. American troops suffered minor frostbite injuries but brought back 17 prisoners, as well as some horses and camp supplies.

=== New York 1780 ===
In the spring of 1780, the regiment was subjected to a thorough inspection by Baron von Steuben, and was found to be "well taken care of". Von Steuben made recommendations as a result of his inspections (which covered much of the Continental Army) that resulted in the merging of the 1st and 2nd Canadian regiments in 1781.

The regiment spent the summer of 1780 at King's Ferry, New York. Regimental orderly books show that it was at Morristown, Bryant's Tavern, Ramapo and Preakness between April 23 and July 26. On August 1 the regiment was reassigned from Hand's Brigade to the New Hampshire Brigade of the Main Army. This brigade was to be under the command of Enoch Poor, but its command was ultimately given to Hazen, although Hazen was not promoted to brigadier general.

On August 23, von Steuben arrested Hazen for halting his brigade on a march without permission. The army was on the march from Tappan to the Liberty Pole, a pre-war landmark located near Englewood, when Hazen halted the march for his troops to drink water. Hazen was acquitted of the charges, and promptly countercharged von Steuben with conduct unbecoming an officer over the incident; von Steuben apologized.

Following the capture of British spy John André and the defection of Benedict Arnold to the British in September 1780, one hundred of Hazen's soldiers, under command of Lieutenant William Torrey, were detailed to be present at André's hanging on October 2, at Tappan, New York.

In the fall of 1780 the regiment was headquartered at Nelson's Point in Garrison, New York, directly across the Hudson River from West Point, before entering winter quarters at Fishkill, New York, in November. During this time eleven officers of the regiment, led by Major James Reid, complained to General Washington (without first consulting Hazen) over the lack of advancement opportunities in the regiment, which were due in part to its unusual position as being the direct responsibility of Congress, rather than under a state's supervision. Reid also made complaints against Hazen, which were heard and dismissed in a November 1780 court martial. Hazen had Reid arrested and confined to quarters afterwards; a long court martial (running from December 1780 to February 1781) resulted in Reid's conviction on two counts and a public reprimand by General Washington.

Regimental orderly books show that during these periods the regiment had operations at Orangetown, Steeprapie and West Point between September 16 and November 19, and at West Point from October 5 to March 5, 1781.

=== Reorganized as Canadian Regiment ===
On January 1, 1781, in accordance with von Steuben's recommendations, the 1st Canadian Regiment was disbanded. The Canadian members were reassigned to the 2nd Regiment, which was then designated as the Canadian Regiment. Most foreign volunteers were also assigned to the regiment.

Hazen and part of the regiment participated in a raid on January 22 led by Lieutenant Colonel William Hull. Hull raided a position held by a Loyalist corps under Lieutenant Colonel Oliver De Lancey Sr. that was at Morrisania (in the present-day Bronx). The Americans burned the enemy's barracks, captured 52 prisoners, and took large supplies of ammunition and forage. Hazen's men were assigned to cover their retreat. About 1,000 British troops pursued Hull's men beyond a point where Hazen and his men were concealed. A skirmish took place, with British losing about 35 men.

On June 1, the regiment was sent from the West Point–Fishkill area to Albany and the Mohawk River valley to guard against an expected British attack. For this action it was reassigned from the Highlands Department to the Northern Department. The regiment arrived at Albany on June 5, and spent most of the month patrolling in the Mohawk River valley against an attack that never came. When the perceived threat subsided, the regiment was immediately ordered to return to West Point. On June 29, Hazen was finally given a brevet promotion to brigadier general.

== Siege of Yorktown ==
On August 10, 1781, the Canadian Regiment was reassigned from the Northern Department to the Main Army. On August 19, Washington used the regiment to feint preparations for an attack on New York. It crossed the Hudson River at Dobbs Ferry and was ordered to march, together with New Jersey troops, to posts on the heights between Springfield and Chatham, in which position the detachment would cover a French battery that had been set up at Chatham "to veil our real movements and create apprehensions for Staten Island." Meanwhile, the main body of the American Army was starting their southward movement toward Yorktown. The regiment withdrew, and held near Kakiat for three days from August 22–25.

The regiment then went down the Hudson River and joined the army on the way to Yorktown. At midnight on September 2, 270 of the regiment and other units arrived at Christiana Bridge over the Delaware. The units unloaded the boats and transported supplies for the Continental Army to Elk Landing during the three days before the boat carriages arrived. On September 24, Hazen was given command of the second brigade of Marquis de Lafayette's Light Division, to which the Canadian Regiment (now under the command of Lieutenant Colonel Antill) was assigned. After cantonment at Williamsburg, the regiment arrived at Yorktown on September 28.

Roughly a quarter of the regiment participated in the siege, and was involved in the October 14 attacks on the British redoubts. According to Lafayette's own account the Americans did not fire a gun, but used only the bayonet. The brigades of light infantry under Generals Peter Muhlenberg and Hazen "advanced with perfect discipline and wonderful steadiness. The battalion of Colonel Vose deployed on the left. The remainder of the division and the rear-guard successively took their positions, under the fire of the enemy, without replying, in perfect order and silence."

=== Guard detail at Lancaster ===
The regiment was reassigned from Hazen's Brigade to the Middle Department on December 6, 1781. On this date, a portion of the regiment went to Lancaster, Pennsylvania, where they guarded prisoners taken at Yorktown. They were on this detail for 10 months with prisoners under guard at Lancaster, York and Reading. The most notable prisoner under Hazen's watch during this time was 20-year-old Captain Charles Asgill. On May 3, 1782, upon orders by Washington, he was selected to hang in retaliation for the brutal summary execution of American Captain Joshua Huddy by the British. In November 1782 his life was spared after heartrending correspondence by his family and intervention by the Queen of France.

In June 1782 Hazen again had James Reid arrested on charges including disobedience and conduct unbecoming an officer. The court martial, held in December, resulted in a mistrial, with Hazen alleging bias on the part of the presiding judge advocate. After additional hearings, Reid was ultimately acquitted of the charges. In November 1782, the regiment was moved to Pompton, New Jersey, for winter quarters. Its duties during this time included the interdiction of trade between the countryside and the British in New York City.

== Disbanded ==
In June 1783, with the peace nearly finalized, much of the regiment was furloughed. At the same time it was transferred to the Highland Department. Pursuant to a Resolution of Congress of May 26, 1783, 300 soldiers were discharged on June 9. However, members of the regiment refused to depart, whether on furlough or discharge, until they received their pay. Members of the regiment that remained were ordered to march to Washington's cantonment near New Windsor. The regiment was reorganized into two companies on June 30 and was completely disbanded on November 15, 1783, at West Point, New York.

Because the Canadians in the regiment were unable to return to their homes, many of them settled in camps near Albany and Fishkill, where they subsisted on handouts from Congress. General Hazen appealed to Congress to give them land grants, but this effort failed. The state of New York eventually granted Hazen and a number of his men land in the northern part of the state near Lake Champlain.

== Troop strength and casualties ==
Strength

The regiment's authorized strength was 1,000 men.

Date	Strength
April 1776	250
June 1777	486
August 1777	about 700
January 1778	592
Spring 1778	720
Autumn 1778	522
January 1779	491
Spring 1780	401
March 1781	418
August – October 1781	418

Casualties

Battle	Date	Casualties
Staten Island	August 22, 1777	8 officers, 40 men
Brandywine	September 11, 1777	4 officers, 73 men
Germantown	October 4, 1777	3 officers, 19 men

== See also ==
- Clement Gosselin
