= Elkins Tavern =

Historic tavern in Vermont, United States

- U.S. National Register of Historic Places
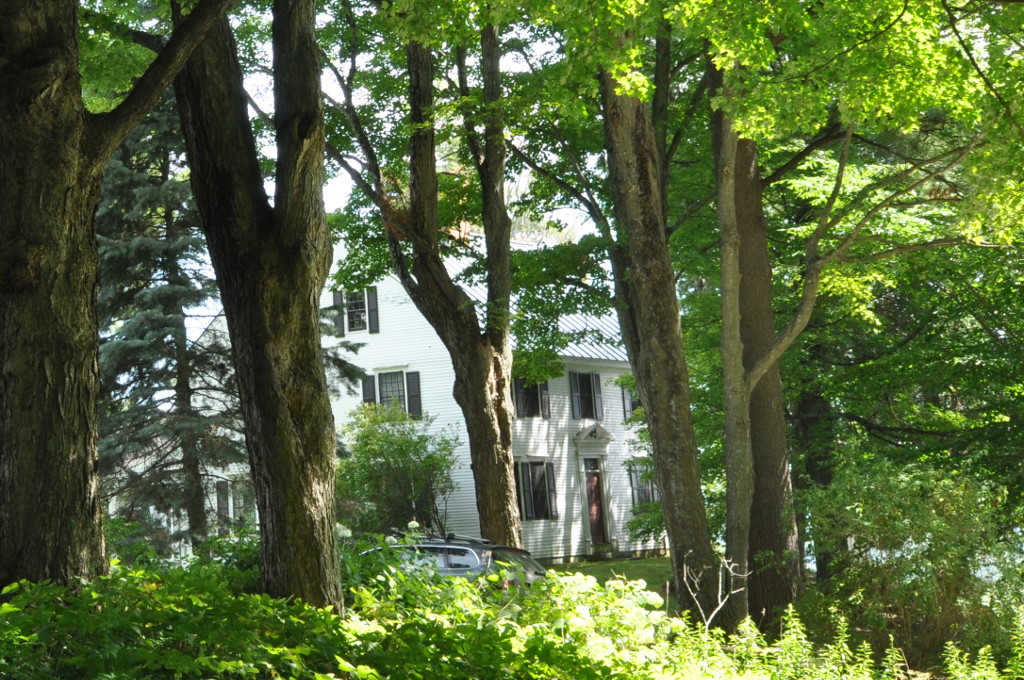

- Location within Vermont Location within the United States
- Location: Bailey-Hazen Rd., Peacham, Vermont
- Coordinates: 44°19′22″N 72°9′58″W
- Area: 75 acres (30 ha)
- Built: 1787
- Built by: Jonathan Elkins
- NRHP reference No.: 78000228
- Added to NRHP: December 18, 1978

The Elkins Tavern is a historic house on Bayley-Hazen Road in Peacham, Vermont. Built in 1787 by one of Peacham's first settlers, it has one of the best-preserved 18th-century interiors in the state of Vermont. It was listed on the National Register of Historic Places in 1978.

== Description and history ==
The former Elkins Tavern, now a private residence, is located south of Peacham's main village, on the east side of Bayley-Hazen Road, a side loop off South Main Street that was once the principal route through the area. The road was built during the American Revolutionary War, and retains much of its original character. The house stands on the east side, on a rise with views to the east and south. It is a 2 1/2-story wood-frame structure, with a side-gable roof, central chimney, clapboarded exterior, and stone foundation. The main facade faces west toward the road, and is five bays wide, with a center entrance flanked by simple pilasters and topped by a transom window, entablature, and gabled pediment. A similar doorway is found on the north facade. The interior retains the original Georgian central chimney plan, with an entry vestibule with winding staircase, and flanking parlor spaces. These rooms, as well as the matching chambers on the second floor, retain many original features, including fireplaces and fireplace surrounds and wainscoting on the walls. The rear spaces have undergone some modernization. A 19th-century barn stands across the street from the house, supposedly on the site of Jonathan Elkins' first residence, a log cabin.

The Bayley-Hazen Road was the first road built through northern Vermont, as part of American military plans for the taking of the British Province of Quebec in the American Revolutionary War. These plans were never realized, but the road (which was built to Hazen's Notch in Westfield) opened the area to settlement. Jonathan Elkins, a native of Haverhill, New Hampshire, arrived in what is now Peacham, and built a log cabin in 1775. The road was built later in the 1770s, passing by his cabin. He built this house in 1787, which also served as a tavern for passing travelers. The old road was eventually bypassed by the present alignment of South Main Street to the west.

== See also ==
- National Register of Historic Places listings in Caledonia County, Vermont
