= Bedel's Regiment =

- Active: 1775–1777 (First Regiment); 1776–1777 (Second Regiment); 1777–1778 (Third Regiment); 1778–1779 (Fourth Regiment)
- Country: United States of America
- Allegiance: Continental Congress of the United States
- Type: Light infantry
- Role: Guerrilla warfare Line formation Raiding; Reconnaissance
- Size: Regiment
- Part of: New Hampshire Line
- Engagements: Invasion of Canada

Commanders
- Notable commanders: Timothy Bedel

Bedel's Regiment refers to a series of revolutionary military regiments formed at the outbreak of the American Revolution to protect northern New Hampshire. The regiments were led by Colonel – later Brevet Brigadier General – Timothy Bedel and primarily served in the Quebec theater of the Revolutionary War.

== History ==
On May 26, 1775, roughly one month after the Battles of Lexington and Concord, the Provincial Congress of New Hampshire voted to conscript a militia of no more than 60 men in the northwestern area of the colony. The regiment was raised as a single company of rangers in Coos County, New Hampshire, led by Colonel Timothy Bedel. Over the next three months, two more companies were raised under the command of Colonel Bedel. The regiment served mostly as an offensive force in the Province of Quebec.

In July 1775, Colonel Bedel led all three companies across New Hampshire and Vermont (Note: The area that is now Vermont was claimed by New Hampshire as the New Hampshire Grants until 1777.) to take part in the Battle of Fort St. Johns.

Between July 1775 and January 1776, eight more companies of rangers were recruited from northern New Hampshire. In February 1776, General George Washington of the Continental Army sent a letter to Bedel, directing him to organize the aforementioned companies as swiftly as possible and to march them to the Canadian Theater as soon as they are raised. Washington also directed Bedel to "take under your Care the Coghnawaga Indians" and to treat them "in the Safest, [and] most Agreeable manner," while providing him with a warrant of payment of £100 (equivalent to £14,169 in 2025) to provide for the Indians' expenses. By March 1776, Bedel complained that the Indians were using more supplies than expected, and requested £300 (equivalent to £42,508 in 2025) to aid in treating their sick, but the local committee of safety refused his request.

In spring 1776, President of the Continental Congress John Hancock issued a warning to New Hampshire of the possibility of an American retreat from Canada. He ordered that any available man should "exert every Nerve to guard against so fatal an Event." Bedel's regiment marched on Newbury, Vermont, where they constructed a blockhouse and breastworks to stage a defense if the Canadian frontline fell. Here, Bedel attempted to recruit hundreds of local "St. Francis Indians" (either Missiquoi or Arsigantegok peoples) from the village of St. Francis (modern Odanak), but the British military significantly hindered these efforts.

Sometime after building defenses at Newbury, the regiment joined the Continental Army and took part in the Battle of the Cedars in May 1776, where most of Bedel's regiment surrendered or was killed. During the battle, Colonel Bedel met with local Native American chiefs in Caughnawaga as directed by General Washington Following the regiment's failure at the Cedars, Colonel Bedel was court-martialed and charged with "quitting his post when an attack was imminent". Testimony from Colonel Frye Bayley and Major General Benedict Arnold led to Bedel's conviction. Bedel's conviction was eventually overturned by the Board of War after Bedel testified that his duties were to "cultivate a friendship with the Indians and engage them if possible in the service of the United Colonies," as much as he disagreed with the orders, and he had his previous rank of Colonel restored.

The Provincial Congress called Bedel back into service in November 1777 and ordered the commission of a new regiment of volunteer militiamen. This regiment was strongly protested by Bedel's political opponents in Exeter, New Hampshire, the de facto capital of the state during the Revolution. Bedel's second regiment served the Connecticut River Valley alongside some Abenaki allies, primarily protecting supply depots and performing rural reconnaissance for military intelligence.

Between November 1777 and January 1778, General Horatio Gates ordered Bedel to raise a new regiment of 500 rangers from western New Hampshire. By January, Brigadier General Moses Hazen ordered Bedel to prepare to have his troops at the Onion River by February 20, and sent $5000 (equivalent to $111,897 in 2025) to supply his troops. However, Bedel never received supplies, so General Thomas Conway ordered Bedel to reroute to Haverhill, New Hampshire. In March, Bedel complained to General Gates of waning supplies under increasing numbers of Indians in his ranks, writing, "what must be done with the poor Savages now in the woods about Co'os?" Major General Marquis Lafayette ordered Bedel to remain in Haverhill and begin the construction of a new blockhouse on the Connecticut River.

Plans for a new fort were shut down by General Gates in June, and instead ordered Bedel to send 100 of his men to Albany, New York; despite Bedel raising 399 Vermont Rangers just a short time earlier and having plenty of men to spare, he was reluctant to follow the orders. Lieutenant Colonel Wheelock took the assigned unit of men and marched to Albany, but their commission expired by March 1779. Governor Thomas Chittenden of Vermont requested Bedel send 100 men to Rutland, but Bedel refused. This again increased pressure from politicians in Exeter, with some even accusing Bedel of embezzling funds from the state and central governments.

On November 5, 1778, Bedel sent a letter to General Gates informing him that Bedel's men had been without wages since April, and lacked appropriate clothing for the coming winter in Haverhill. Bedel also requested blankets for the Indian women and children, and ammunition for his swelling militia. All of his requests were denied by Gates on the same date on account that Boston lacked most of these supplies. Bedel continued to request materials and supplies for his companies through the winter, all the while constructing "a barracks, a guardhouse, and a bake oven." By January 1779, his regiment was disbanded (although Bedel continued to pay for a private militia), his Abenaki allies dispersed, and an investigation was opened by General Washington into the operations at Haverhill.

Bedel's final regiment assisted in a road- and blockhouse-building infrastructure project in Peacham, Vermont in May 1779.

=== Number of Regiments ===
Bedel raised four regiments during the course of the Revolution, any of which may be known as "Bedel's Regiment". Bedel's first regiment disbanded sometime in 1777, while another was formed and disbanded concurrently. A third regiment, formed beginning in November 1777, was protested by politicians in Exteter, New Hampshire. Bedel's fourth regiment, alongside Hazen's Regiment, controlled the Connecticut River valley and its adjacent farmlands following raids by Canadian guerrillas.
