= Peacham (CDP), Vermont =

Census-designated place in Vermont, United States

Peacham, Vermont
- Census-designated place
- Peacham, Vermont, from the west

- Location within Vermont Location within the United States
- Coordinates: 44°19′46″N 72°10′21″W
- Country: United States
- State: Vermont
- County: Caledonia
- Town: Peacham

Area
  - Total: 1.54 sq mi (3.99 km^{2})
  - Land: 1.54 sq mi (3.99 km^{2})
  - Water: 0 sq mi (0.0 km^{2})
- Elevation: 1,319 ft (402 m)
- Time zone: UTC-5 (Eastern (EST))
  - Summer (DST): UTC-4 (EDT)
- ZIP Code: 05862
- Area code: 802
- FIPS code: 50-54325
- GNIS feature ID: 2805706

Peacham is the primary village and a census-designated place (CDP) in the town of Peacham, Caledonia County, Vermont, United States. It was first listed as a CDP prior to the 2020 census. The Peacham Corner Historic District, listed on the National Register of Historic Places, occupies the four roads extending outward from the crossroads at the village center.

== Geoggraphy ==
The village is in southwestern Caledonia County, in the eastern part of the town of Peacham. It sits on a hill that drains northeast to East Peacham Brook and south to South Peacham Brook. Both brooks are tributaries of the Stevens River, which flows east to the Connecticut River at Barnet.

Peacham is 6 miles (10 km) south of U.S. Route 2 at Danville, 7 miles (11 km) northwest of Interstate 91 at Barnet, and 8 miles (13 km) north of U.S. Route 302 at Groton. Groton State Forest is to the west.
