= Timothy Bedel =

American politician

Timothy Bedel (1737 – February 24, 1787) was a soldier and local leader prominent in the early history of New Hampshire and Vermont.

Bedel was born in Salem, New Hampshire. During the French and Indian War he served as a lieutenant in the New Hampshire Provincial Regiment at Fort at Number 4, Crown Point, Fortress Louisbourg, the capture of Quebec and later at the capture of Havana, Cuba. Bedel served in the New Hampshire colonial and state assembly during and after the war and was elected to the break away assembly to create New Connecticut which became known as the Vermont Republic.

Bedel and his wife Elizabeth had a son named Moody Bedel, born on May 12, 1764, who became a brigadier general during the War of 1812. Moody Bedel held a grant of land in Northern New Hampshire, known as Bedel's Grant. Subsequently the area was settled by John Haynes and others and the Indian Stream Republic (1785–1842) was formed in the area that is now Pittsburgh, New Hampshire. Moody Bedel's son John Bedel was a brigadier general of volunteers during the American Civil War.

Bedel lived in Bath, New Hampshire between 1769 and 1775.

== American Revolution ==
On May 26, 1775, Timothy Bedel, a member of the New Hampshire provincial assembly representing Bath, was appointed to command a company of rangers to be raised at Coos, New Hampshire (an Abenaki name for a place variously spelled cowasuk, cohos, or Koes), a military command located in Haverhill, New Hampshire and Newbury, Vermont where natives gathered to transport people and goods into Canada.

Bedel recruited a unit which quickly grew into a regiment of eight companies. He became a colonel in the New Hampshire militia to protect the northern frontier of New Hampshire in an area of disputed land Grants between Fort at Number 4 and Crown Point. A contemporary soldier of the French and Indian War with whom he served, William Stark, an older brother of John Stark, also wanted this command, and when turned down William Stark joined the British Army.

Bedel's Regiment joined the Continental Army during the Invasion of Canada. Bedel saw action at the Siege of Fort St. Jean. When his unit arrived he was the senior regimental commander. His command was criticized by General Richard Montgomery for overspending and wasting of provisions, particularly rum.

He missed the Battle of the Cedars while he was ill at the hospital at Lachine, Quebec. At The Cedars, most of Bedel's Regiment was captured by the British and their Native American allies. Eight days later his men were exchanged for British soldiers captured at the St. Jean. Both Bedel and his second-in-command, Major Isaac Butterfield, were court-martialed for the disaster at The Cedars. Bedel was found not guilty, while Butterfield was found guilty of cowardice. Bedel's Regiment was disbanded on January 1, 1777, when enlistments expired.

He recruited a series of ranger regiments for New Hampshire. Part of his command became part of the Green Mountain Boys at the Battle of Quebec.

Bedel served as a first lieutenant in a militia regiment at the Battle of Bennington under General John Stark, became a staff officer for Generals Philip Schuyler and Horatio Gates at Saratoga concerning Indian affairs, and was restored to regimental command. On December 11, 1779, General George Washington ordered Colonel Bedel to raise another regiment at Coos to help Colonel Moses Hazen and General Jacob Bayley in the construction of a possible invasion route to Canada and to conduct an investigation of misconduct and fraud against the Continental Army Quartermaster at Coos, New Hampshire.

== Later years ==
After the war, Bedel worked unsuccessfully to have lands in northern New Hampshire and Vermont granted to Abenakis who had sided with the United States during the war.

Some early histories state that Bedel became a general in the New Hampshire, Vermont, or New York militia, but historian Albert Batchellor could find no evidence of this and believed it to be an error because Bedel was always addressed by his contemporaries as "Colonel". Bedel died in Haverhill, New Hampshire.
