= Battle of the Cedars =

1776 skirmishes of the American Revolutionary War

Coordinates: 45.3099°N 74.0353°W

- Part of the American Revolutionary War
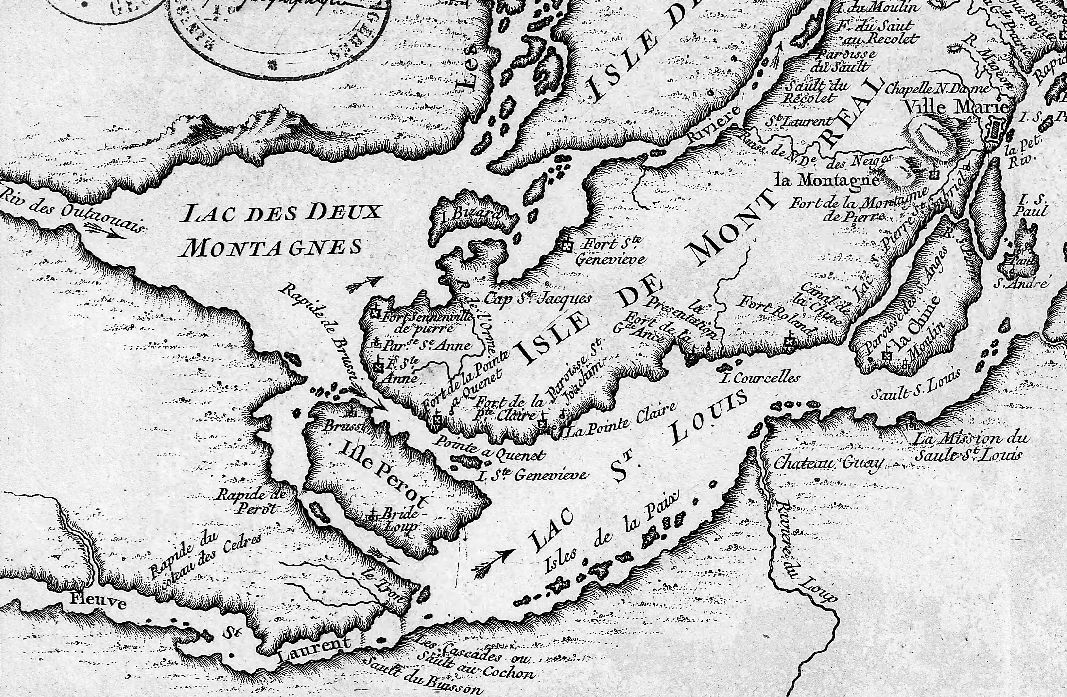
- 1764 map showing western part of the island of Montreal (Isle de Mont Real), with the growing town centred on Fort Ville Marie in the upper right and the Cedars (overlooking Rapide du coteau des Cedres) in the map's lower left corner.
Date	May 18–27, 1776
Location	Les Cèdres, Quebec, southwest of Montreal
Result	Anglo-Haudenosaunee victory

Belligerents
Great Britain; (Kingdom of Great Britain) Quebec; Haudenosaunee	(United States) United Colonies; Canadian sympathizers

Commanders and leaders
George Forster	Isaac Butterfield (POW); Henry Sherburne (POW); Benedict Arnold

Strength
40 regulars; 11 militia; 204 Haudenosaunee warriors	Cedars: 400 regulars and militia; Quinze-Chênes: 100 regulars and militia

Casualties and losses
Cedars: none; Quinze-Chênes: 1 killed, 4–5 wounded	Cedars: all captured; Quinze-Chênes: 5–6 casualties, rest captured

National Historic Site of Canada
- Official name: Battle of the Cedars National Historic Site of Canada
- Designated: 1928

The Battle of the Cedars (French: Bataille des Cèdres) was a series of military confrontations in the early stages of the American Revolutionary War that occurred during the Continental Army's invasion of Quebec, which began in September 1775. These skirmishes, which involved limited combat, occurred in May 1776 at and around the Cedars, 45 km (28 mi) west of Montreal, Quebec. American troops were opposed by a small British Army detachment leading a larger force of Haudenosaunee warriors and Canadian Militia.

Brigadier General Benedict Arnold, commanding the American garrison at Montreal, had placed a detachment of his troops at the Cedars in April 1776, after hearing of rumors of British and Indian military preparations to the west of Montreal. The detachment surrendered on May 19 after a confrontation with a combined Anglo-Haudenosaunee force led by Captain George Forster. American reinforcements on their way to the Cedars were also captured after a brief skirmish on May 20. All of the prisoners were eventually released after negotiations between Forster and Arnold, who brought a sizable force into the area. The terms of the agreement required the Americans to release an equal number of British prisoners, but the deal was repudiated by the Second Continental Congress and no British prisoners were freed.

Colonel Timothy Bedel and Lieutenant Isaac Butterfield, commanders of the American force at the Cedars, were court-martialed and cashiered from the Continental Army for their roles in the affair. After distinguishing himself as a volunteer, Bedel was given a new commission in 1777. News of the engagement included greatly inflated reports of casualties and often included graphic but false accounts of atrocities committed by the Haudenosaunee, who made up the majority of Forster's force.

== Background ==
The Cedars is on the north shore of the Saint Lawrence River, about 45 kilometres (28 mi) from the center of modern Montreal, to the southwest of the western tip of the Island of Montreal, from which it is separated by the Ottawa River. The nearby rapids in the Saint Lawrence required portage, making the Cedars a strategic landing point for anyone navigating the river to or from Montreal. Crossing of the Ottawa River was made between Fort Anne and Quinze-Chênes, now Vaudreuil.

=== Montreal ===
In September 1775 during the American Revolutionary War, Continental Army troops under first Major General Philip Schuyler and later Brigadier General Richard Montgomery invaded the British Province of Quebec. Montreal was taken without a fight on November 13, following the siege of Fort St. Jean. Montgomery left a garrison of troops under the command of Major General David Wooster in control of Montreal before leading the rest of the army to Quebec City. The occupation of Montreal was poorly managed, and relations between the Americans and the population, including those supportive of the Americans, deteriorated for a variety of reasons. One major factor that contributed to the poor relations was the American interdiction of British trade with Indians on the upper St. Lawrence and the Great Lakes, since the trade goods might be used to support British garrisons in those areas. The fur trade was economically important to the city, and its interruption affected both supporters and opponents of the American cause.

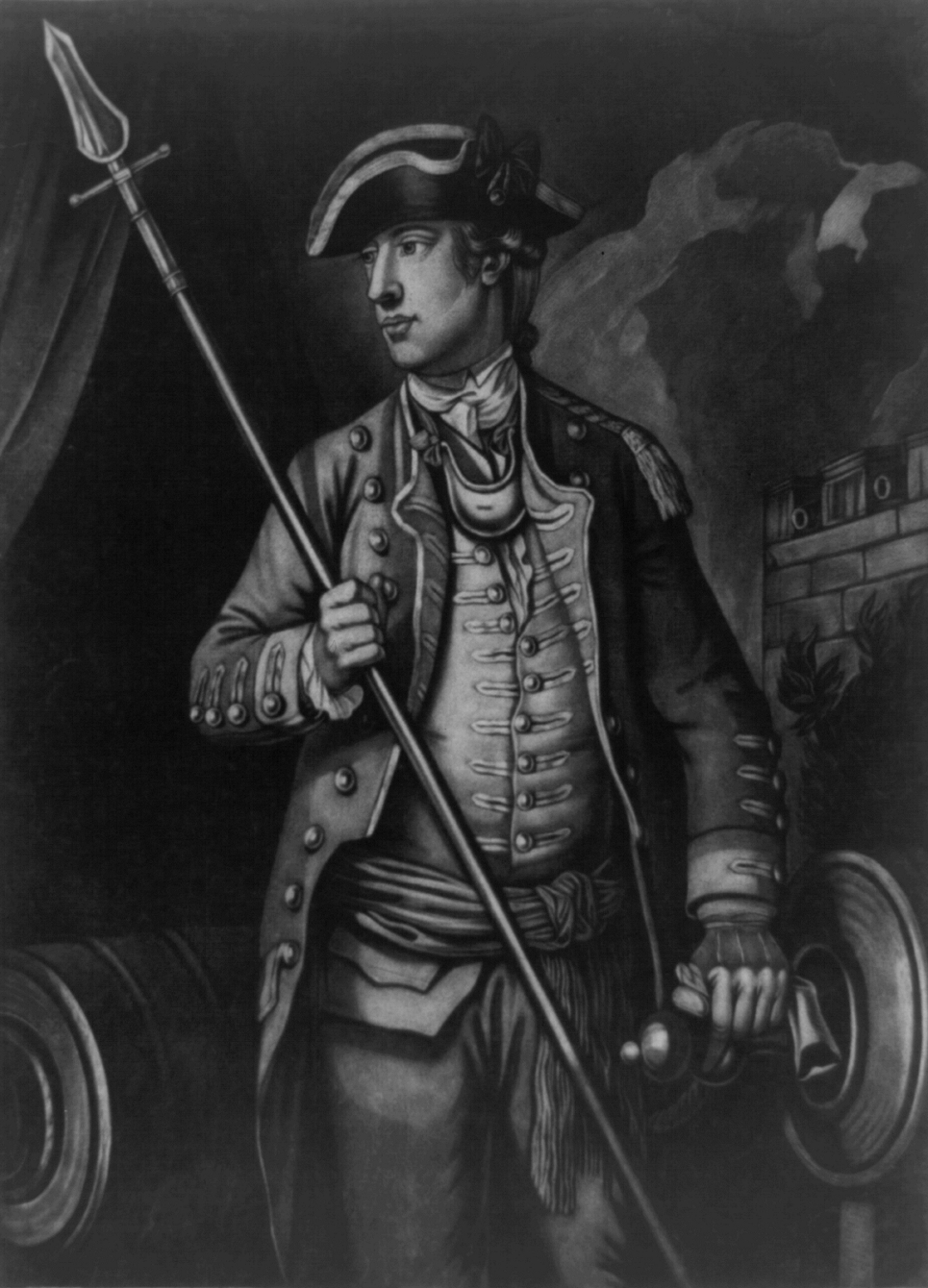
Major General David Wooster

Following the American losses at the battle of Quebec at the end of 1775, Wooster eventually led reinforcements to Quebec. He arrived early in April 1776, and the military administration of Montreal passed temporarily to Colonel Moses Hazen before going to Brigadier General Benedict Arnold, who had been in command at Quebec. The American forces occupying the city numbered about 500, with additional forces at posts outside the city. Wooster had reported to General Schuyler as early as March 5 of rumored scheming between British forces and Indians to the west of the city. In response to these alarming reports, as well as the unauthorized departures of two fur traders and Claude-Nicolas-Guillaume de Lorimier, a British Indian Department agent from Montreal, Hazen had sent 400 troops commanded by Colonel Timothy Bedel of Bedel's Regiment to occupy a strategic position at the Cedars in early April. Lieutenant Isaac Butterfield led an advance force that arrived at the Cedars on April 26 and began construction of a wooden stockade fort, fortifying it with two 4-pound cannons. Bedel and the rest of the detachment arrived on May 6.

=== British call to arms ===
Lorimier traveled west to Oswegatchie, where a company of the 8th Regiment of Foot under the command of George Forster had occupied Fort de La Présentation. Lorimier proposed recruiting a force of Indians to launch an attack on American troops at Montreal from the west. When Forster agreed, Lorimier went to Saint Regis, where he recruited 100 Mohawk warriors from Akwesasne. Word of these activities led the American rebels to fortify the Cedars.

At Fort Niagara in early May the Loyalist captain, John Butler, held a conference with several hundred Indians, primarily Haudenosaunee, in which his goal was to break pledges of neutrality some of them had made in 1775. Butler, an experienced Indian agent, plied the Indians with liquor and tales of combat; he convinced more than 50 Seneca, Cayuga, and Onondaga warriors to join forces with the British, as well as some Indian warriors from further west. Historians are uncertain whether any of these recruits participated in the action at the Cedars, but it appears unlikely. Stanley (1973) is of the opinion that Indian participation was limited to those recruited by Lorimier, who went as far as Gananoque to recruit. Lanctot (1967) and Smith do not identify any specific tribes participating in the action.

James Stanley Goddard, one of the fur traders who left with Lorimier, traveled further west in an ultimately unsuccessful effort to raise an Indian force to oppose the Americans occupying Quebec. He reached Fort Michilimackinac in June, where the British commander, Captain Arent DePeyster, sent him recruiting among the Menominee and Winnebago tribes near Green Bay. DePeyster also sent out Joseph Ainsse, a local Indian interpreter, to recruit from tribes closer to the fort. None of the Indians recruited by these men reached Montreal until well after the Americans had left the city.

== Prelude ==
Once forces began assembling at Oswegatchie, Lorimier made arrangements with a sympathetic priest near the Cedars for the provisioning of supplies for the troops. With the assistance of some men of the 8th Foot, he strategically hid several shallow-draft boats, known as bateaux, near a point where the Saint Lawrence River could be crossed.

Forster left Oswegatchie on May 12 with about 40 regulars, 10 men of the Canadian Militia, and 160 Haudenosaunee warriors. On May 14, they linked up with 44 more Haudenosaunee warriors at Saint Francis, and camped at the western end of Saint Francis Lake on May 16. On May 17, Forster received scouting reports about the troop strength at the Cedars. The Indians were concerned about the number of troops, but news that the Americans were in retreat from Quebec emboldened them to act.

On May 15, Bedel left the Cedars, leaving Butterfield in charge of the fort. Bedel later claimed that the reason for his departure was to meet with the friendly Caughnawaga Indians. In his court martial, the judges concluded this claim was suspect. He returned to Montreal and reported that a force of 150 British troops of the 8th Foot and about 500 Haudenosaunee commanded by Forster was approaching. On this news, Colonel John Paterson sent Major Henry Sherburne with 140 men from his regiment toward the Cedars. Arnold, who was meeting with the retreating Continental Army command at Sorel, returned to Montreal when the news reached him and set about organizing a larger relief force.

== Battle ==
=== The Cedars ===
Map showing military movements. British movements are in red; American movements are in blue.

Forster's force landed near the American-occupied fort on May 18, and sent in a demand for surrender. Butterfield countered with a request to withdraw under arms, which Forster refused. The parties exchanged fire. During the course of the exchange, Forster received word that Sherburne had crossed the Ottawa River from the island of Montreal to Quinze-Chênes but, believing the Cedars to have fallen already, had retreated back across the river. This news caused the besiegers to redouble their efforts the next day. Additional help arrived for the British in the form of about 40 Canadian militiamen under Jean-Baptiste Testard de Montigny; Forster sent them to harass Sherburne. Word then came to Forster that Sherburne had resumed his advance; Butterfield, unaware of this, surrendered the fort. The terms of capitulation included a guarantee of the personal safety of the captured men. The Haudenosaunee plundered the fort's stores, and denied some of the captives small pouches of sometimes valuable personal items.

=== Quinze-Chênes ===
Sherburne reached Fort Anne, across the Ottawa River from Quinze-Chênes, on May 17. A scout he sent across the river the next day was captured by Lorimier. The scout was allowed to notify Sherburne of his capture; in his message he included a claim that 500 Indians had surrounded the fort at the Cedars. Consequently, Sherburne decided to delay crossing the river, and sent word back to Montreal requesting further assistance.

Sherburne decided to advance on May 20. Some of his men were apparently suffering from the aftereffects of smallpox, so these were left behind. Sherburne landed about 100 of his men at Quinze-Chênes, about 16 kilometres (10 mi) from the Cedars. When word of this crossing reached Forster, he ordered Lorimier to take 100 Indian warriors and stop Sherburne. Lorimier was at first only able to muster 40 warriors, but was joined on the way by another 40. Sherburne, not realizing that Butterfield had already surrendered, marched his troops right at Lorimier's advancing force. They fought for about 40 minutes before Sherburne, believing he was being attacked by a much larger force, surrendered. The Haudenosaunee claimed these captives as war spoils, since they were not part of the fort's garrison, and prepared to kill some of them in retaliation for their own losses. Only the intervention of Forster, who paid a ransom, prevented this; it did not prevent the Haudenosaunee from stripping the prisoners of all but their clothes.

=== Arnold's relief ===
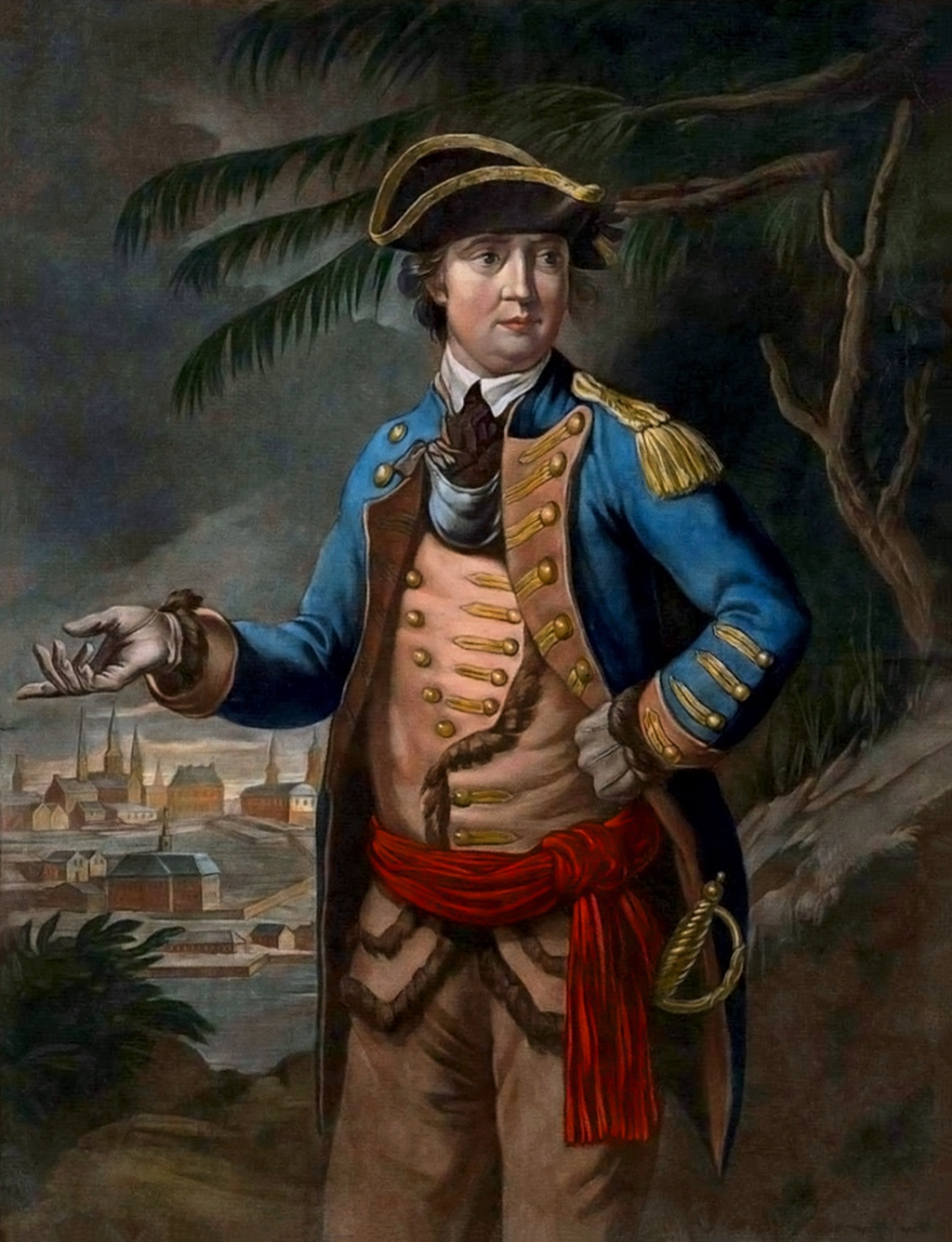
Brigadier General Benedict Arnold

Following his successes, Forster moved his forces, including all of the prisoners, down to Quinze-Chênes, where more Loyalist militia had assembled. Leaving some of the prisoners there, he advanced on May 23 to Fort Senneville, a fortified works on the southwest tip of Montreal Island that was owned by Montigny. In the meantime, Arnold gathered most of the few remaining forces in Montreal, and sent requests to the outposts around the city for additional troops. By May 24, he was entrenched at Lachine, south of the city, and his force had reached 450 men. Forster began to advance on Lachine, but decided to retreat back to Quinze-Chênes when his scouts notified him of Arnold's position. He also received intelligence from Montreal that Arnold's force was going to be massively reinforced—the reported number of reinforcements was 1,500 to 2,000 men, more than Arnold had available in the area.

Once his scouts reported Forster's retreat, Arnold gave chase. He reached Fort Senneville (which he burned) on May 26, just as Forster's men were landing on the far shore at Quinze-Chênes. Arnold decided to send a group of Caughnawagas, who were friendly to the Americans, with a demand that Forster release his prisoners and a threat that he would destroy area Indian villages if any of the prisoners were harmed. Forster countered that he would permit his Indians to kill the prisoners if Arnold attacked. Arnold attempted to cross the Ottawa River with some of his men in bateaux, but Forster used the four-pounders captured at the Cedars to drive them back.

Movements after the battle: · A, B: British move to Fort Senneville, May 20–23 · C: British retreat, May 24–25 · D, E: American advance to Ottawa River crossing, May 26

Arnold called a war council so the Americans could consider their options. He wanted to mount a surprise attack the next morning; Hazen, who had acquired significant experience fighting Indians in the French and Indian War, argued against the idea. The disagreement between the two men was severe enough that it nearly provoked Arnold to file charges of insubordination against Hazen. The council decided not to act, voting Arnold's proposed attack down. Early in the morning of May 27, a boat crossed the river carrying Sherburne and Forster's deputy, Lieutenant Parke. Forster, whose forces were somewhat reduced as some of the Indians had returned to their homes, had negotiated a prisoner exchange with Sherburne and Butterfield. After further negotiations, both Arnold and Forster agreed to terms. The American prisoners were returned to Arnold at Fort Anne on May 30, after being delayed for two days by high winds on the river.

== Aftermath ==
The Americans never held up their side of the prisoner exchange. Formally repudiating the agreement over the protests of George Washington, Congress accused Forster of mistreating American prisoners by turning them over to the Indians. In a breach of etiquette, the letter containing the repudiation was delivered to Lieutenant-general John Burgoyne instead of the governor of the Province of Quebec Guy Carleton. The Congressional action may have been tainted by overly lurid accounts of the action—Charles Carroll, part of a Congressional delegation that was in Montreal at the time, reported that "a hundred or more [American troops] were barbarously murdered by savages."

Arnold's report of the incident included otherwise unsubstantiated allegations that two prisoners were killed by Forster's Indians. Some histories of the action (for example, the 1882 history by Jones) include accounts of significant atrocities committed by the Indians, but little supporting evidence has been found. The Congressional repudiation complicated an attempted prisoner exchange in 1781 involving Burgoyne and Henry Laurens, a congressman from South Carolina whom the British were holding in the Tower of London; Laurens was eventually freed in exchange for a promise to help negotiate Lord Cornwallis's release.

Arnold initially blamed Bedel for the defeat. He removed both Bedel and Butterfield from command and sent them to Sorel for court-martial. Due to the army's retreat, the two men were not tried until August 1, 1776, at Fort Ticonderoga. Both were convicted and cashiered from the army. Bedel continued to volunteer his services, and following Burgoyne's surrender at Saratoga in October 1777, he was given a new commission by Congress. The site of some of the skirmishes was designated a National Historic Site of Canada in 1928.

== See also ==
- List of National Historic Sites of Canada in Quebec
