= Peacham Corner Historic District =

Historic district in Vermont, United States

- U.S. National Register of Historic Places
- U.S. Historic district
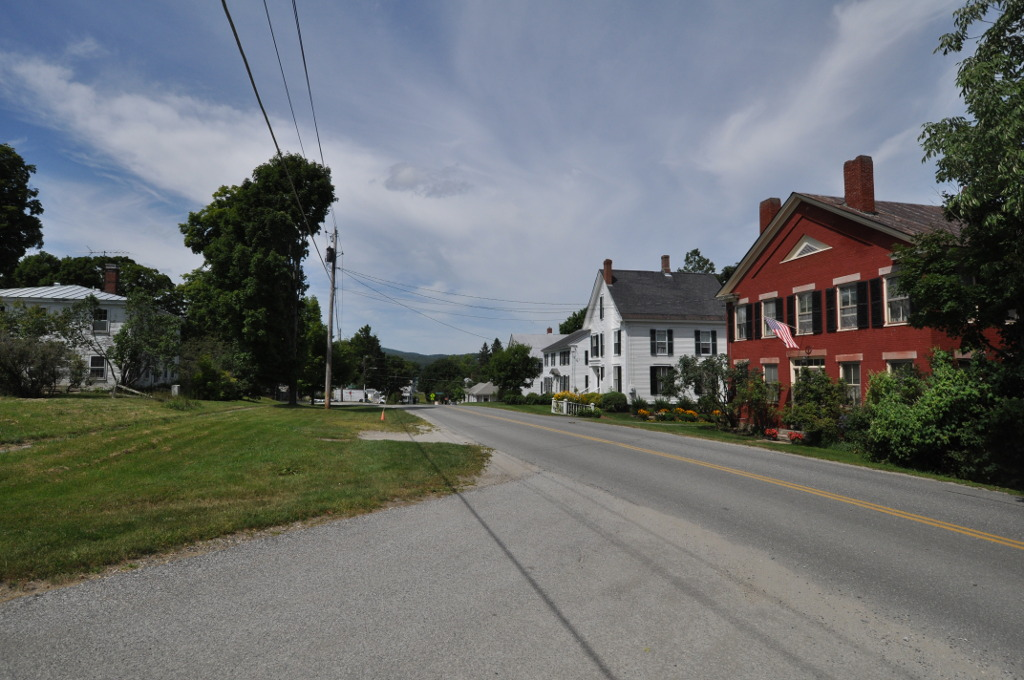

- Location within Vermont Location within the United States
- Location: Bayley Hazen Rd., Main St., Church St., Academy Hill, Old Cemetery Rd., Macks Mountain Rd., Peacham, Vermont
- Coordinates: 44°19′39″N 72°10′21″W
- Area: 100 acres (40 ha)
- Architectural style: Greek Revival, Federal
- NRHP reference No.: 03001308
- Added to NRHP: December 18, 2003

The Peacham Corner Historic District encompasses much of the historic village center of Peacham, Vermont. The village's period of greatest growth and importance between the town's founding as a hill town in the late 18th century, and 1860, when significant development effectively ended. As a result, the village lacks Victorian features often found in other rural communities. The district was listed on the National Register of Historic Places in 2003.

== Description and history ==
The town of Peacham was first settled in 1776, partly as a consequence of the construction of the Bayley-Hazen Military Road during the American Revolutionary War. In the Peacham Corner area that became the town center, that road, now the major north–south route through the town, skirted around a hill on which the early town center was laid out. This included the church (the present Congregational Church, completed 1806), cemetery (established 1811), and the Peacham Academy, one of the region's first secondary schools (founded 1797, closed in 1971). The church was moved down the hill a ways in 1844, and the academy's early buildings no longer stand, although later buildings have been converted to housing). Growth in the village came to a virtual standstill with the outbreak of the American Civil War, which drained the community of significant parts of its population. The result is a little-altered mid-19th century hill village, which was largely bypassed by the architectural styles of the late 19th century.

The historic district is centered at the junction of Bayley-Hazen Road with Church Street and Old Cemetery Road, extending a modest distance to the north, east, and south. It extends further to the west on Church Street and Macks Mountain Road, where the academy, church, and some other civic buildings and residences stand. Also found in this area is the town common, at the triangular junction of Academy Hill Road, Church Street, and Macks Mountain Road, where the town's war memorial is located. Most of the village's buildings are modestly scaled 1-1/2 to 2 1/2-story wood-frame structures, built either in the Federal or Greek Revival style.

== See also ==
- National Register of Historic Places listings in Caledonia County, Vermont
