= Josiah and Lydia Shedd Farmstead =

- U.S. National Register of Historic Places
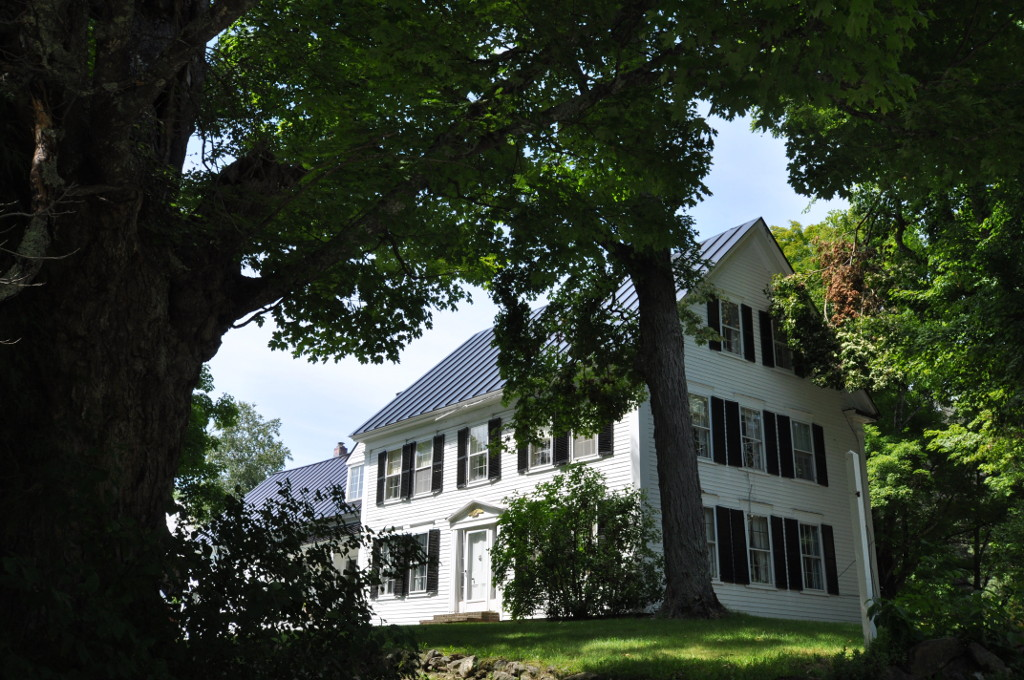

- Location within Vermont Location within the United States
- Location: 1721 Bayley-Hazen Rd., Peacham, Vermont
- Coordinates: 44.34372°N 72.17667°W
- Area: 25.6 acres (10.4 ha)
- Built: 1830
- Architectural style: Greek Revival
- MPS: Agricultural Resources of Vermont MPS
- NRHP reference No.: 05000188
- Added to NRHP: March 17, 2005

The Josiah and Lydia Shedd Farmstead is a historic farm property at 1721 Bayley-Hazen Road in Peacham, Vermont. Established in 1816, the property evokes a typical 19th-century Vermont hill farm. Its oldest surviving buildings, the main house and two barns, survive from the second quarter of the 19th century. The property was listed on the National Register of Historic Places in 2005.

== Description and history ==
The Shedd Farmstead is located in a rural area of north of Peacham Corner, on the west side of Bayley-Hazen Road north of its junction with Slack Street. The farm property, originally about 100 acres (40 ha), now consists of 25 acres (10 ha) on the west side of the road. The farmstead building cluster is located near the southern end of the property, much of which is wooded. The farmhouse, closest to the road, is a 2-1/2 story wood frame Greek Revival structure, set facing south. It is five bays wide and three deep, with windows topped by low entablature, and a center entrance flanked by sidelight windows and pilasters, and topped by gabled cornice. A 1-1/2 story wing extends to the west. Further from the road stand two English bank barns, joined together in an L shape.

The land for this farm was purchased by Josiah and Lydia Shedd in 1816; it is unknown if the land was cleared before their ownership. The present farmhouse was built in the late 1830s, probably as a present for their daughter Jane, who married Noah Worcester in 1841, and died the following year. The Shedds were prominent local citizens; Josiah served as the town physician for many years, and Lydia was regularly engaged in charitable and other civic activities. After their daughter's death, the Shedds rented the property to tenant farmers, and practice also engaged in by subsequent owners. It ceased to be used for any agricultural purpose in 1955.

== See also ==
- National Register of Historic Places listings in Caledonia County, Vermont
