= Moses Hazen =

American general

- Born: June 1, 1733; Haverhill, Massachusetts, British America
- Died: February 5, 1803 (aged 69); Troy, New York, U.S.
- Military career
- Allegiance: Kingdom of Great Britain; United Colonies; United States
- Branch: British Army; Continental Army
- Service years: Provincial militia: 1755–1757; British Army: 1758–1763; Continental Army: 1775–1783
- Rank: Brigadier General
- Units: Rogers' Rangers; 44th Regiment of Foot; 2nd Canadian Regiment
- Commands: 2nd Canadian Regiment
- Conflicts: French and Indian War; Siege of Louisbourg; St. John River Campaign; Siege of Quebec (1759); Battle of Sainte-Foy; American Revolutionary War; Battle of Quebec; Battle of Brandywine; Battle of Germantown; Siege of Yorktown

Signature
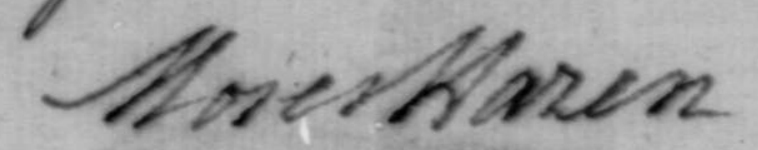

Moses Hazen (June 1, 1733 – February 5, 1803) was a brigadier general in the Continental Army during the American Revolutionary War. Born in the Province of Massachusetts Bay, he saw action in the French and Indian War with Rogers' Rangers. His service included particularly brutal raids, during the Expulsion of the Acadians and the 1759 Battle of Quebec. He was formally commissioned into the British Army, shortly before the war ended, and retired on half-pay outside Montreal, Province of Quebec, where he and Gabriel Christie, another British officer, made extensive land purchases in partnership. During his lifetime he acquired land in Quebec, New Hampshire, Vermont, and New York, but lost most of his Quebec land due to litigation with Christie and the negative effects of the Revolution.

In 1775 he became involved in the American invasion of Quebec early in the American Revolutionary War, and served with the Continental Army, in the 1775 Battle of Quebec. He went on to lead his own regiment, (the 2nd Canadian, also known as "Congress' Own") throughout the war, seeing action in the 1777 Philadelphia campaign and at Yorktown in 1781. He was frequently involved in litigation, both military and civil, and constantly petitioned Congress for compensation of losses and expenses incurred due to the war. He supported similar efforts by men from his regiment who were unable to return to Quebec because of their support for the American war effort.

== Early life ==
Moses Hazen was born in Haverhill, a frontier town in the Province of Massachusetts Bay, to an old New England Puritan family. Histories that mention Hazen sometimes indicate that he was Jewish, however a genealogist documents Hazen's lineage to England, where the family name was Hassen. Some contemporaries of Hazen seem to have thought he was Jewish; for example, Sergeant James Thompson, in his diary The Fraser’s Highlanders, describes meeting him during the retreat from the Battle of Sainte-Foy: "On the way, I fell in with a Captain Moses Hazen, a jew".

== French and Indian War ==
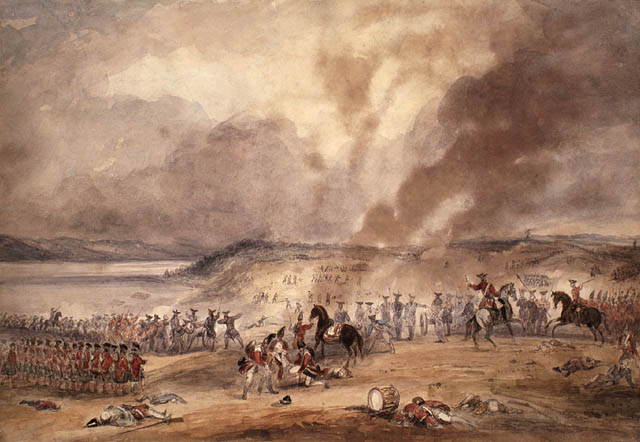
George Campion's Battle of Sainte-Foy

Hazen was apprenticed to a tanner when the French and Indian War broke out. In 1756, he enlisted with the local militia, which included a number of family members. He first served at Fort William Henry near Lake George, where he probably first met, and may have served under, Robert Rogers of Rogers' Rangers. Rogers eventually recommended him for an officer's commission in a new company of the Rangers; in 1758, after having worked for his brother providing supplies for the British Siege of Louisbourg, he was commissioned as a first lieutenant in John McCurdy's company of the Rangers at Fort Edward. In McCurdy's company, he saw action at Louisbourg, including the initial landings, when the action was quite fierce.

After Louisbourg, the company was stationed first at Fort Frederick (Saint John, New Brunswick), and then at Fort St. Anne, where the company was part of a campaign against Indians and Acadians that had taken refuge there from the ongoing expulsion of the Acadians. These raids were sometimes quite brutal; the company was known to scalp Acadian settlers. In one particularly brutal incident, Hazen was responsible for the scalping of six men, and the burning of four others, along with two women and three children, in a house he set on fire. Joseph Godin dit Bellefontaine, a leader of the local militia and the father of one of the women, claimed that he was forced to witness this event in an attempt to coerce his cooperation with the rangers. (Godin escaped into the woods with two of his grandchildren.) General Jeffery Amherst, who did not hear of the incident until after he had promoted Hazen to captain, noted, "I am sorry that to say what I have since heard of that affair has sullied his merit with me as I shall always disapprove of killing women and helpless children."

In January 1759, Captain McCurdy was killed when a tree felled by one of his men fell on him; Hazen was given command of the company. Later in 1759, his company was at the siege of Quebec, where the company was primarily engaged in scouting and raiding in the countryside; he was away on one of those raids during the Battle of the Plains of Abraham. In another notable atrocity that may have involved Hazen's company, a priest and thirty parishioners in a parish near Quebec were killed and scalped.

Hazen also fought at the 1760 Battle of Sainte-Foy, where he was severely wounded in the thigh. He thus missed the final British campaign which saw the capture of Montreal later that year, although his Rangers did take part. In February 1761, he purchased a commission as a first lieutenant in the 44th Regiment of Foot in the British Army. He spent the remainder of the war on garrison duty at Montreal, retiring on half-pay in 1763. General James Murray wrote approvingly of Hazen in 1761, "He discovered so much still bravery and good conduct as would justly entitle him to every military reward he could ask or demand".

== Land development ==
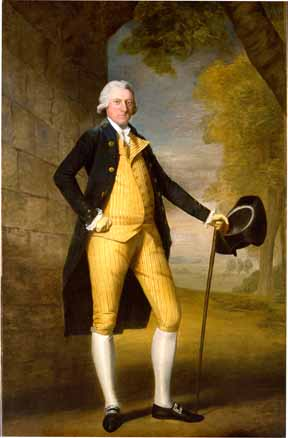
Hazen's business partner, Gabriel Christie

During the siege of Quebec, Hazen had met Gabriel Christie, then a deputy quartermaster. Christie owned some land in the Richelieu River valley south of Montreal, and wanted to expand his holdings. (Christie later became one of the largest landowners in Quebec.) After the war, Christie and Hazen jointly purchased the seigneuries of Sabrevois and Bleury, located on the east bank of the Richelieu near Fort Saint-Jean. They also leased land on the west side of river from the Baron of Longueuil. These holdings gave them almost exclusive control over the land holdings around Saint-Jean, which is the northernmost navigable point reachable from Lake Champlain.

Christie, who was still in military service, was frequently away from the land, so Hazen developed the land while Christie provided the funding. Hazen constructed a manor house at Iberville, and two mills, and set about selling timber and other business endeavours. In 1765, Hazen was also appointed a deputy land surveyor, and a justice of the peace. As part of his business dealings, he offered General Thomas Gage, then in command of British forces in New York City, facilities and lumber for military use. Gage was uninterested at the time, letting Hazen know that he would keep the offer in mind, if the need for military movements became necessary in the area.

Hazen expanded the business of the seigneuries, but his aggressive development also incurred debts, which caused friction with Christie. In 1770, Christie, unhappy with the debts, eventually demanded an accounting. This ultimately led to a division of the holdings, with Hazen receiving the southern portion of the Bleury seigneurage, styled Bleury-Sud. Hazen and Christie were in and out of court for years afterward over control of these lands; Christie eventually won complete control over those lands after the American Revolution.

In 1762 Hazen's brother John settled Haverhill, New Hampshire, in the far north of that province on the east side of the Connecticut River, and in 1764 Jacob Bayley settled Newbury, in what is now Vermont, across the river from Haverhill. Hazen had shares in both of these settlements; he also acquired land west of the Connecticut River in what is now Bradford, Vermont. It was at this time that the idea of constructing a road from there to Saint-Jean was first raised; this idea surfaced again during the American Revolutionary War, when George Washington authorized construction of what became known as the Bayley Hazen Military Road.

His land developments continued to grow in 1764 when he joined the Saint John River Society, and organization created by a group of military officers for the purpose of developing land along the Saint John River, then in Nova Scotia (now New Brunswick). His coinvestors included Thomas Gage, Frederick Haldimand, William Johnson, and Thomas Hutchinson.

In the fall of 1770 Hazen married Charlotte de la Saussaye, a woman from a good family in Montreal. They settled down near Saint-Jean, where they built a house and began farming.

== American Revolutionary War ==
=== Continental Army service ===
At the start of the Revolutionary War, in 1775, Hazen was living on British half-pay in Saint-Jean. When Benedict Arnold raided Fort Saint-Jean on May 18, Hazen reported the news of that raid (as well as the capture of Fort Ticonderoga) first to the military authorities in Montreal, and then to Governor Guy Carleton in Quebec, before returning home to consider the consequences the conflict might have on him and his lands.

The American invasion of Quebec arrived near his home at Saint-Jean on September 6. On that day, Hazen met with General Philip Schuyler, gave him information that Fort Saint-Jean was well-defended and unlikely to be taken by siege, and that the local habitants were unlikely to assist the American effort. This gloomy portrait led Schuyler to consider retreating; but the arrival of additional American troops, and a more optimistic assessment from James Livingston, a grain merchant living near Chambly, encouraged the Americans to renew the attack. Livingston went on to form the 1st Canadian Regiment in November 1775.

=== Imprisonment and release ===
On September 17, Brigadier General Richard Montgomery, now commanding the American forces, began to besiege Fort St. Jean. The next day, a detachment of American forces under the command of John Brown arrested Hazen north of the fort. However, a British sortie from the fort forced Brown's men to retreat; Hazen ended up in British hands. Major Charles Preston, the British commander, was mistrustful of Hazen, and sent him to Montreal under the guard of Claude de Lorimier. Brigadier General Richard Prescott, unhappy with Hazen's explanations of his movements, imprisoned him.

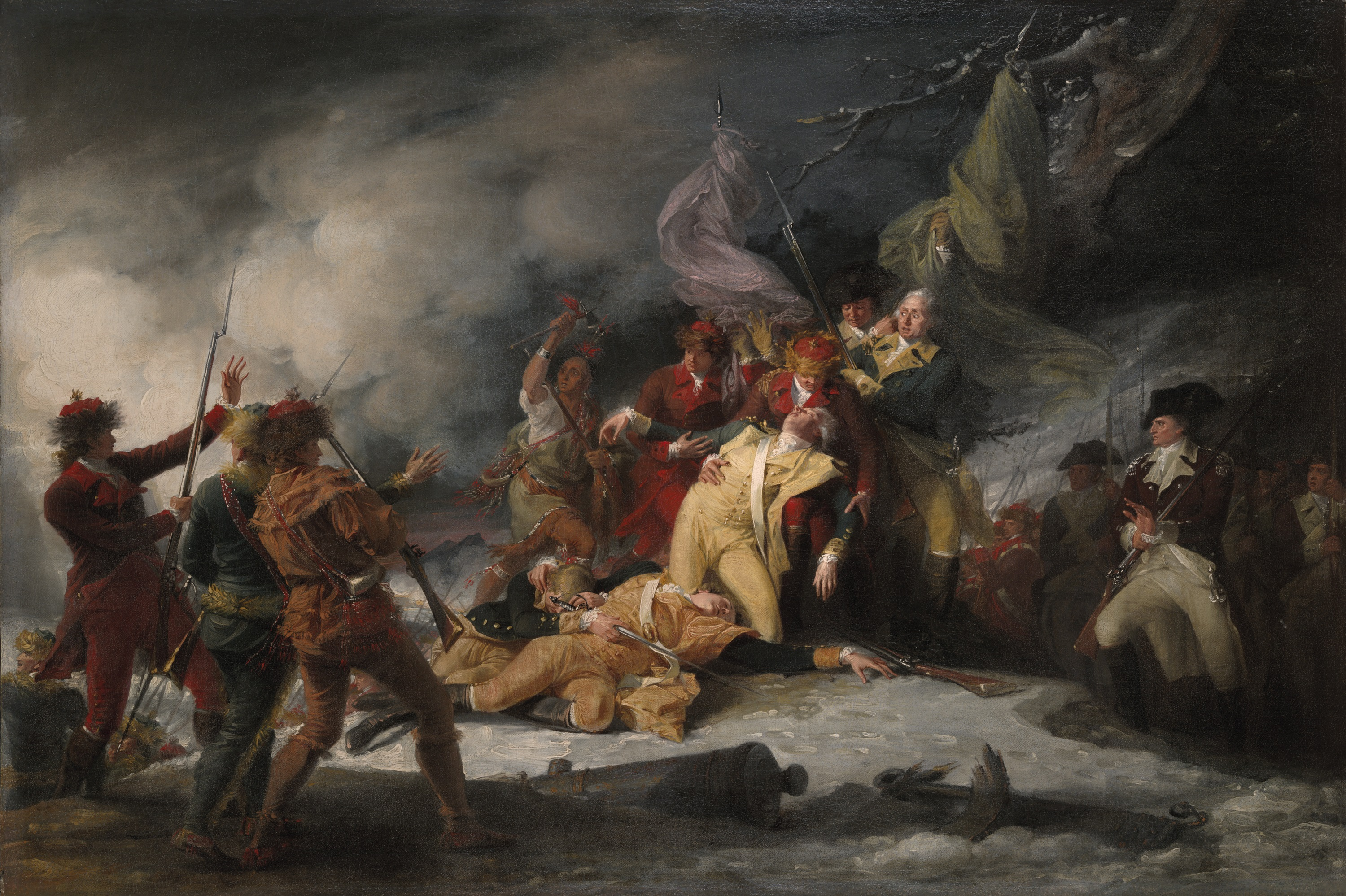
The Death of General Montgomery in the Attack on Quebec, December 31, 1775 John Trumbull, 1786

He was held in poor conditions for 54 days. Following the fall of Fort St. Jean, the British withdrew from Montreal, transporting prisoners on one of the ships used in the evacuation. Most of this British fleet was captured by the Americans, who released Hazen and other prisoners who had supported them. Unhappy with his treatment by the British, Hazen now joined the American forces, on their way to Quebec City. He joined the invaders even though Americans had done significant damage to his estate during the siege, plundering it for supplies, and using his house as a barracks.

=== Service in Quebec ===
Hazen served the American army in the Battle of Quebec, and was one of two men (the other was Edward Antill) sent to report the devastating loss to the Second Continental Congress in Philadelphia. The Congress, in recognition for his efforts, gave Hazen a commission as a colonel, leading the Continental Army's 2nd Canadian Regiment. (Antill was commissioned the regiment's lieutenant colonel.) The regiment was often referred to as "Hazen's" or "Congress' Own", the latter because the regiment was established by Congress and was not part of any state quotas. Hazen was initially offered a position as brigadier general, but he refused, requesting instead a colonel's commission, and indemnification against losses caused by the conflict. (His property had already been significantly damaged by the American action around St. Jean.) Hazen was fortunate in arriving in Philadelphia before John Duggan, one of Livingston's captains, to whom Benedict Arnold had earlier promised the commission for the 2nd Canadian.

Hazen and Antill returned to Quebec, where Hazen was stationed at Montreal while Antill recruited men for the regiment. Hazen was briefly in command of the defenses of Montreal for the Americans, from late March to mid-April 1776, when General David Wooster took command of the American forces outside Quebec, and Benedict Arnold assumed command of the Montreal garrison. During the time he was in command, Hazen dispatched Timothy Bedel and 390 men to fortify The Cedars, about 40 miles (64 km) upriver from Montreal; these forces surrendered to a British-Native force during the Battle of The Cedars in May.

=== Trouble with Arnold ===
Following Arnold's assumption of command at Montreal, Hazen's regiment was assigned to garrison duty at Fort Chambly. Hazen (and likely his men) were called as reinforcements to assist in the American response to the action at The Cedars. In council, Hazen and Arnold had a heated exchange over what actions to take; in Arnold's opinion, Hazen's behavior bordered on insubordination. Arnold had previously held a high opinion of Hazen, writing that he was "a sensible, judicious officer, and well acquainted with this country".

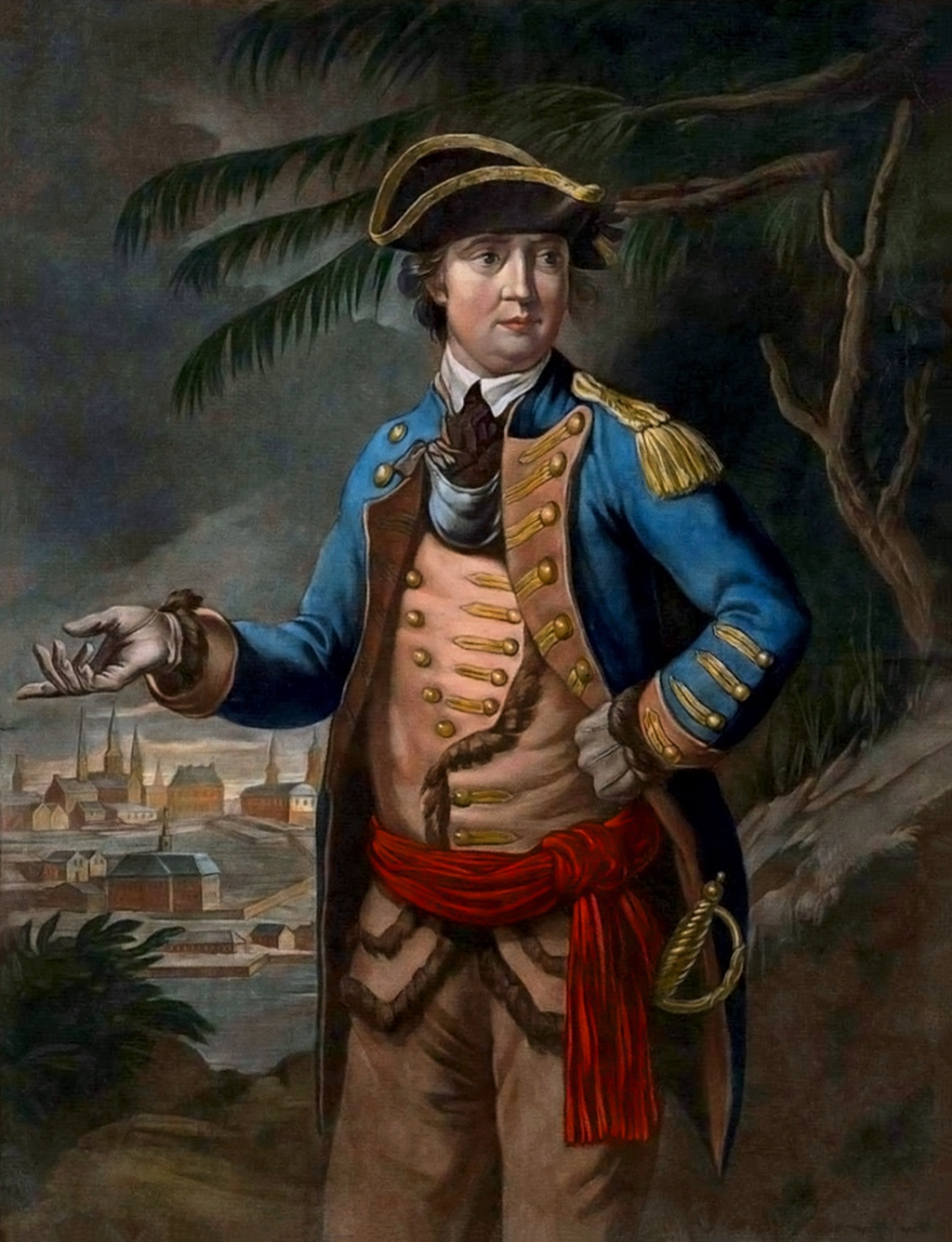
Mezzotint of Benedict Arnold by Thomas Hart, 1776

During the American retreat from Quebec in May and June 1776, Hazen and Arnold were embroiled in a dispute that led to charges and counter-charges, courts martial and other hearings, lasting into 1779. At issue were supplies that Arnold had ordered seized from merchants in Montreal and sent to Chambly for eventual shipment south as part of the retreat. Hazen, in charge of the facilities at Chambly, refused to sign for the goods, as he recognized them as the property of friends in Montreal. In the ensuing retreat, most of these goods were plundered and lost. Arnold wanted to immediately court-martial Hazen for failing to follow orders, but the arriving British army delayed any such activity until the army's return to Fort Ticonderoga. Arnold's opinion of Hazen clearly changed; he wrote, "This is not the first or last order Col. Hazen has disobeyed. I think him a man of too much consequence for the post he is in."

Hazen's court martial was held on July 19, 1776; he was honorably acquitted. However, there were irregularities in the proceedings, the judge advocate being the same officer, who had delivered the goods, from Montreal, to Chambly, so he did not testify; Arnold continued to attack Hazen afterwards. In December, 1776, another inquiry was held, and Hazen was again cleared of any wrongdoing. Hazen then countercharged Arnold with the plundering of the Montreal merchants; Arnold was not cleared of these charges until a higher-level inquiry in 1777.

=== Building his regiment ===
Hazen's regiment, which was significantly reduced in size by the retreat from Quebec, was assigned first to Ticonderoga, and then to Albany, in the summer and fall of 1776, before being ordered to winter quarters at Fishkill, New York. During this time, Hazen continued recruiting, receiving permission from Congress to recruit anywhere in the United States. In the northern states he ran into difficulties, as those states were having trouble filling their own regimental lines; he was often outbid by other recruiters. Antill, who recruited in the central states (primarily New Jersey, Maryland, and Pennsylvania), had greater success. By June 1777, the regiment reached about 700 members, out of an authorized strength of 1,000. The cultural differences between the original Quebec enlistees and the new recruits from the Thirteen Colonies was a regular source of friction within the regiment, and Hazen consequently kept the French-speakers in companies separated from the English-speakers.

Hazen also submitted to Congress a claim for damages to his estate in Quebec. The original bill was for $11,363; Congress paid $2,595 in October 1776.

=== Philadelphia campaign ===
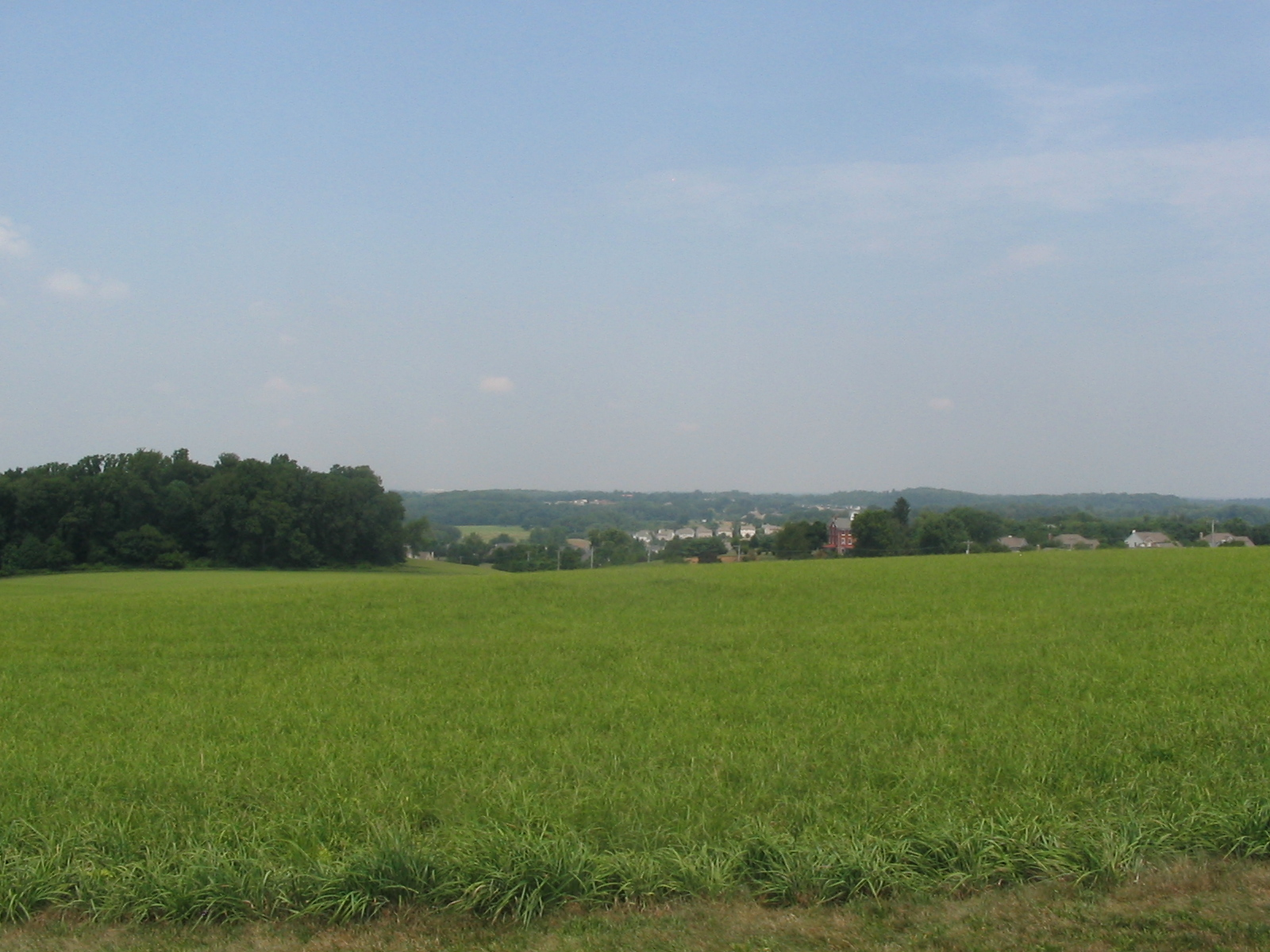
The Brandywine battlefield today

In May 1777, Hazen's regiment was ordered to join the main army at Princeton, where it was active in the Philadelphia campaign as part of John Sullivan's brigade. Some of Hazen's companies (but not Hazen himself) participated in the Battle of Staten Island; in this action, Antill was captured. Hazen's command during the Battle of Brandywine included the northern (right) end of the American line; this position was one of those flanked by the British in their attack. Hazen made an early report indicating the presence of British troops on the American flank that turned out to be the main British thrust. His report was dismissed by General Sullivan, who wrote, after receiving other reports, that "Colo. Hazen's Information must be wrong." To Sullivan's detriment, the other reports were wrong, and Hazen's was correct; the British flanking maneuver was instrumental in the American loss of the battle. Hazen's regiment lost 4 officers and 73 men in the battle. In the Battle of Germantown, Hazen commanded a brigade that included in addition to his own regiment, the 2nd, 4th, and 6th Maryland Regiments. They formed part of Sullivan's column when it marched on the town; his regiment lost 3 officers and 19 men in the engagement.

=== Bayley-Hazen Road proposed ===
Hazen, ever since his return to the United States in 1776, had maintained a constant stream of communications with Congress, primarily on the subject of Canada. In January 1778, these communications bore some fruit, when, with French assistance, planning for an invasion of Canada began. Hazen was assigned the job of deputy quartermaster for this operation. However, the planning was hampered by supply and staffing difficulties, and never got off the ground. It was ultimately cancelled by Congress in March 1778.

This failure did not deter Hazen from offering a new route for invading Canada. This route went from Newbury, where Hazen owned land and knew the area, to Saint Francis, Quebec. On July 12, Hazen departed Newbury to scout the route. By July 25, he had returned to White Plains; the effort was abandoned for the time being because the manpower was needed in the New York area. Plans for possible attacks against Quebec based on routes departing from the Newbury area were again contemplated in the fall of 1778, but Washington continued to resist the idea.

=== Construction work on the road ===
In the spring and summer of 1779, Hazen's regiment and that of Timothy Bedel worked on construction of the Bayley Hazen Military Road, once again with the eventual goal of launching an invasion. Part of the road, between Newbury and Peacham had been constructed in 1776 by Jacob Bayley. Hazen supervised the development of the road up to what is now called Hazens Notch in northern Vermont. Work was discontinued on the road in August after word was received that the British were preparing a military force at Saint-Jean to attempt capture of the construction crew. General Washington had never intended to send an invasion along this route; the entire works was a ruse to divert British attention, and deter them from launching an invasion. Washington wrote to Congress that the work "was for the purpose of exciting jealousies at Quebec and at the Enemy's posts on the St. lawrence, and of making a diversion in favor of the late expedition under general Sullivan ... this very happily succeeded".

=== Service around New York ===
Hazen and his regiment spent the winter at Washington's main encampment in Morristown, New Jersey. There Hazen was again involved in litigation; he was rejected for service on a court martial considering charges against Benedict Arnold due to their previous confrontations, and he also opened complaints of supply mismanagement during the summer's roadbuilding activities. A detailed review of the army in the spring of 1780 by Baron von Steuben led to the recommendation that the regiments of Hazen and Livingston be merged, as Livingston's had shrunk to 103 men. Hazen and Livingston had a political tussle over seniority; although Hazen lost the claim to seniority, he ended up in command of the combined regiment.

In January 1780 the regiment was involved in a failed attack on Staten Island; word of the operation leaked to the British. Hazen's regiment was then transferred to the brigade of Enoch Poor. By the time the transfer was effected, Hazen was given command of the entire brigade, although repeated requests he had made for promotion to brigadier general were rejected. During the summer the brigade was relocated to the West Point area. While en route, Hazen allowed his men to stop for water, breaking the army column. Von Steuben ordered Hazen's arrest for this transgression of military discipline. Hazen was acquitted, and promptly countercharged von Steuben with behavior unbecoming an officer and gentleman; von Steuben apologized.

Hazen's regiment was garrisoned opposite West Point that fall when British Major John André was captured and General Arnold defected. One hundred of Hazen's men, including his nephew, Benjamin Mooers, witnessed André's hanging.

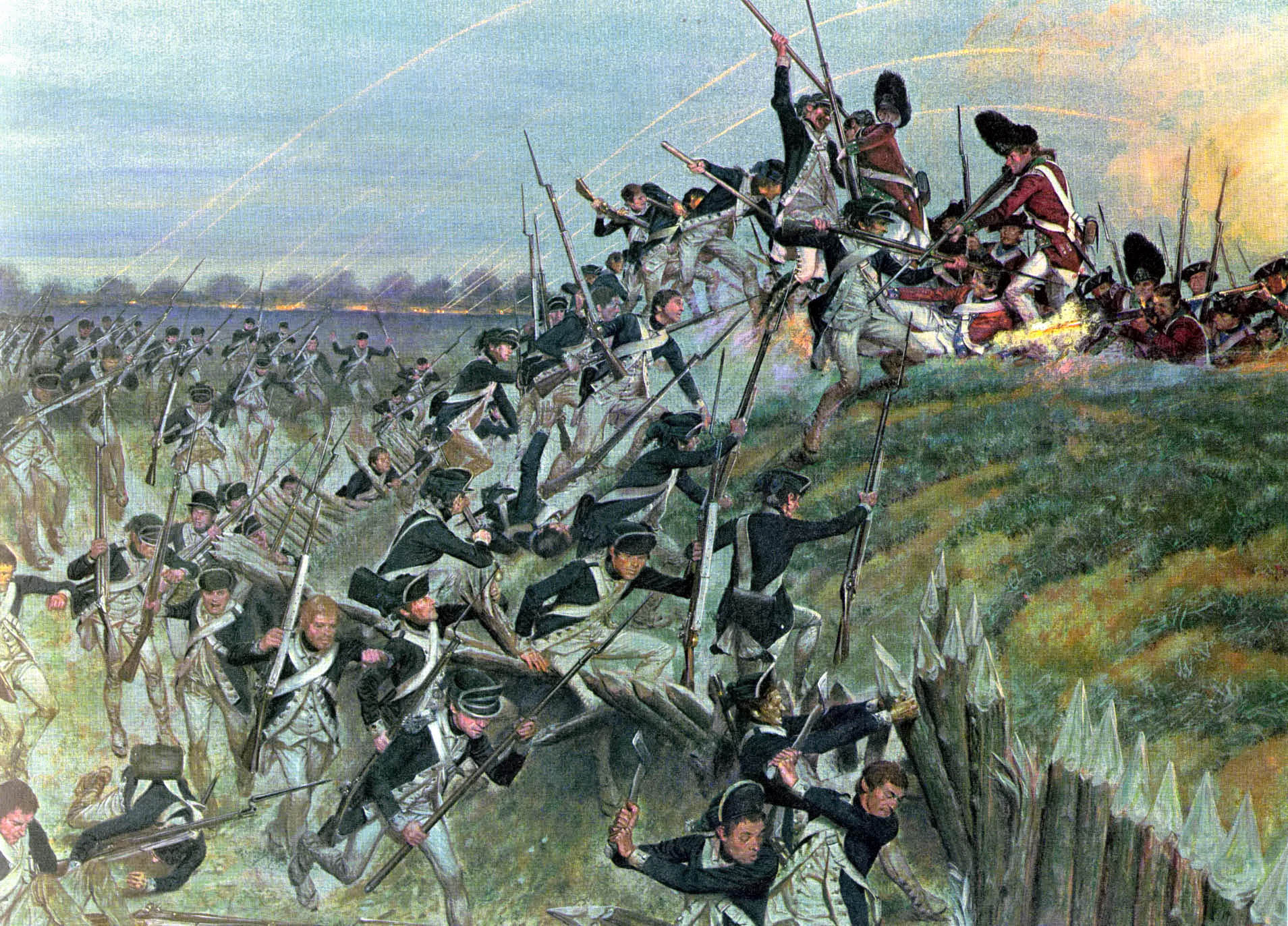
Some of Hazen's troops were involved in the storming of redoubt#10 at the Siege of Yorktown.

On June 29, 1781, Hazen was finally promoted to brigadier general and assigned command of a brigade under Lafayette during the siege of Yorktown. Hazen's brigade served on the right of the line, and was deeply involved in the October 14 battles for the redoubts.

After the British surrender, Hazen and his unit were given prisoner guard duty at Lancaster, Pennsylvania. While stationed there, an international diplomatic situation, known as the "Asgill Affair", developed that threatened the peace treaty between the newly independent U.S. and Britain. Following a series of retributive executions between patriots and loyalists, Washington, in May 1782, instructed Hazen that a British captain should be executed in retaliation for the execution of patriot captain Joshua Huddy. On May 27, 1782, Hazen carried out Washington's order. Charles Asgill was chosen from amongst 13 British captains by the drawing of lots. The selection was a violation of the terms of the Yorktown surrender, which protected prisoners of war from acts of retaliation. Asgill's situation drew the attention of Queen Marie Antoinette; Washington received a letter from the French Foreign Minister, comte de Vergennes, making it clear that this course of action would be unacceptable to the French Crown. Due in large part to this intervention, Asgill was released to return to England in November 1782.

During the winter of 1781–82 Hazen also took time off for personal business. Among his dealings was a partnership with Timothy Bedel to acquire land along the military road they had built in Vermont.

== After the war ==
After the war, General Hazen, unable to return to Quebec, received a grant of land in northern New York in the Canadian and Nova Scotia Refugee Tract. He was active for many years on behalf of the men who served under him and their families, especially those that originally came from Quebec, in their quest for compensation for their losses. Hazen was also an original member of the Rhode Island Society of the Cincinnati. He also continued his litigious ways—he was involved in an ongoing string of legal actions until his death. He died in 1803 in Troy, New York, where he was buried. His nephew, Benjamin Mooers, was ultimately responsible for untangling many of Hazen's affairs.

On May 26, 1828, Congress authorized a payment of $3,998.81 to Hazen's heirs in compensation for the half-pay lost to him when he joined the American forces.

== Legacy ==
- Namesake of Bayley Hazen Military Road
- Namesake of Hazen's Notch in the Green Mountains of northern Vermont
- Namesake of Hazen Union School in Hardwick, Vermont
