= Jacob Bayley =

Jacob Bayley (July 19, 1726 – March 1, 1815) was an officer, first serving with the British in the French and Indian War, then later as a brigadier general in the Continental Army during the American Revolutionary War.

After the French and Indian War, Bayley was one of the founders of Newbury, Vermont, and Haverhill, New Hampshire, He became wealthy from the proprietorship thereof, but during the Revolutionary War he paid for military expenses and soldiers' pay out of his own pocket, for which he was never compensated, and he died an impoverished man.

== Early life and family ==
He was born in Newbury, Massachusetts. On July 19, 1726, he married Prudence Noyes (1729–1809). The following year, they and their first child, Ephraim, moved to Hampstead, New Hampshire. At the first town meeting on February 5, 1749, he was elected one of the town's five selectmen.

== French and Indian War ==
He was initially a lieutenant in the New Hampshire Provisional Regiment and spent the fall of 1755 scouting the area around Lake Champlain.

Promoted to captain, he raised a company that was among the defenders at the siege of Fort William Henry in August 1757. When the British surrendered on the promise by the French victors that they would be protected from the latter's Native American allies. However, the terms of capitulation were violated; the Native Americans attacked the British soldiers and their dependents as they withdrew, killing many soldiers and capturing women, children, servants and slaves. Captain Bayley was among those who managed to escape. According to family tradition, he fled, running barefoot 12 miles (19 km) to Fort Edward; the Provincial Assembly of New Hampshire awarded him £14, 11s, 6p for his losses during the retreat, which included his shoes.

The war turned in favor of the British. Bayley participated in General Amherst's capture of Fort Carillon and of Montreal in New France, which essentially ended the fighting in North America. By the end of the war, Bayley had been promoted, first to lieutenant-colonel, then to colonel.

== Inter-war years ==
=== Founding of Newbury and Haverhill ===
With the war over, in the fall of 1760 Bayley and three hometown friends and fellow officers — Captain John Hazen and Lieutenants Jacob Kent and Timothy Bedel — left Montreal to go home. On their travels, they found a location at the Oxbow, an extension of the Connecticut River, that they decided to make their new home. In the summer of 1761, Bayley, Hazen and some hired hands cleared the fields around the Oxbow. The first four permanent settlers arrived in February 1762. On May 18, 1763, Benning Wentworth, colonial governor of the Province of New Hampshire, granted them charters for Newbury (named after the hometown of Bayley and the others) and Haverhill, on opposite sides of the Oxbow (Newbury on the west bank and Haverhill on the east bank).

=== Bayley and Ethan Allen ===
A dispute over land titles, which found Bayley and Ethan Allen on opposing sides, exacerbated by religious and other differences, resulted in mutual animosity.

== American Revolutionary War ==
On May 22, 1776, the Committees of the Counties of Cumberland and Gloucester, New York, nominated then-Colonel Bayley for the position of brigadier-general of the state militia of those counties. The promotion was approved.

Bayley, as a colonel and later as a brigadier general, corresponded with George Washington (63 letters can be read in their entirety at Founders Online, an official website of the United States government administered by the National Archives and Records Administration), first regarding constructing the Bayley Hazen Military Road, then about the situation in Canada and a possible second invasion attempt. (The United States had unsuccessfully invaded Quebec in 1775.) He and Moses Hazen built the Bayley Hazen Military Road, starting in 1776, to support a second invasion of Canada that never materialized. In 1777, he was appointed Commissary General of the Northern Department of the Continental Army.

Bayley only saw action once in the war, leading a division in the October 7, 1777, portion of the Battles of Saratoga He was stationed with 2000 New Hampshire militiamen north of Fort Edward.

In the early 1780s, the British were conducting the secret Haldimand Negotiations with the Vermont Republic. Because of Bayley's implacable opposition to negotiations with the British, an attempt was made to take him prisoner and take him to Canada, but it narrowly failed. Bayley's neighbor, Colonel Thomas Johnson, had earlier been captured by the British and released on parole, but he violated his parole in 1782 to forewarn Bayley. (Ethan Allen was one of the Haldimand negotiators, further exacerbating his relationship with Bayley.)

== Legacy ==
There is a monument to General Bayley in the Newbury town common.
