= Bayley Hazen Military Road =

Historical military road between Canada and the USA

The Bayley–Hazen Military Road was a military road that was originally planned to run from Newbury, Vermont, to St. John's, Quebec, not far from Montreal. The southern 54 miles (87 km), running from Newbury to Hazen's Notch near the Canada–United States border, were constructed between 1776 and 1779 during the American Revolutionary War. Portions of the road's route are used by modern roads today.

The road is named for the principal proponents of its construction. Jacob Bayley and Moses Hazen were among the founders of Newbury and nearby Haverhill, New Hampshire, and Hazen also had property interests at St. John's. The idea for the road featured prominently in several proposals (promoted primarily by Hazen to George Washington and the Second Continental Congress) for invasions of Quebec by Continental Army forces following the failed 1775 invasion.

== Background ==
After hostilities in the French and Indian War ended in 1760, several veterans of that war founded the communities of Haverhill and Newbury on either side of the Connecticut River in the far north of the British province of New Hampshire. The land on the west side of the river was the subject of disputes between New Hampshire and the province of New York, and was known then as the New Hampshire Grants; this territory eventually became the state of Vermont.

== First construction ==
Work to develop the road occurred first in 1776. General George Washington, to support the Continental Army's 1775 invasion of Quebec, asked Thomas Johnson, a local landowner, to blaze a trail to St. John's on the Richelieu River near Montreal that army regiments could use to reach the area. On March 26, 1776, Johnson and four men set out through the snow, covering the 100 miles (160 km) to St. John's in 11 days. Several Continental Army regiments made their way along this trail that year, prompting Washington to order construction of a road. Jacob Bayley and 60 men constructed, apparently at Bayley's expense, about 6 miles (9.7 km) (into present-day Peacham, Vermont) until rumors arrived that a British army was coming down the trail to stop them. The construction was abandoned amid concerns of invasion in the small communities. (Only a small company of Canadiens came down the trail as far as Peacham.) It is unclear whether Bayley was ever repaid for this work.

== Second construction ==
Moses Hazen, then colonel in the Continental Army, was directed by Washington in the spring of 1779 to renew construction of the road. His regiment and that of Colonel Timothy Bedel worked on the road throughout the summer of 1779, extending it through the present-day communities of Cabot, Walden, Hardwick, Greensboro, Craftsbury, Albany, and Lowell. Blockhouses were also constructed along the route, at Peacham, Cabot, Walden, and Greensboro (on a site still called Block House Hill). Work was abandoned when the road reached the place now known as Hazen's Notch in Westfield, again on rumors that the British were sending a force to stop the construction work. In addition, decision-makers came to the realization that a road could just as easily be used for a British invasion of the Thirteen Colonies.

== Revolutionary War uses ==
Even after construction was abandoned on the road, the blockhouses on the route were manned, and occasionally subjected to minor skirmishes and scouting actions. The road was apparently identified by the British for use in raiding expeditions in 1780; the raid against Royalton and other small Vermont communities may have included Peacham and nearby communities as targets. Strong local militia may have deterred the raiders from making an attack there. Jacob Bayley was also targeted by the British for kidnapping; at least one attempt was made using the road, which failed as Bayley was alerted to the plan.

In 1781, the Greensboro blockhouse was attacked "by Indians"; two scouts were killed. A memorial stone was erected near the site 160 years later.

== After the war ==
The road was the only road in the area, and became a route for migration and development of the Northeast Kingdom of Vermont. Little evidence of the original road exists, as much of its route has been taken over by state and local roads, but there have been reports of archaeologists locating isolated sections of corduroy.
