= Hazen's Notch =

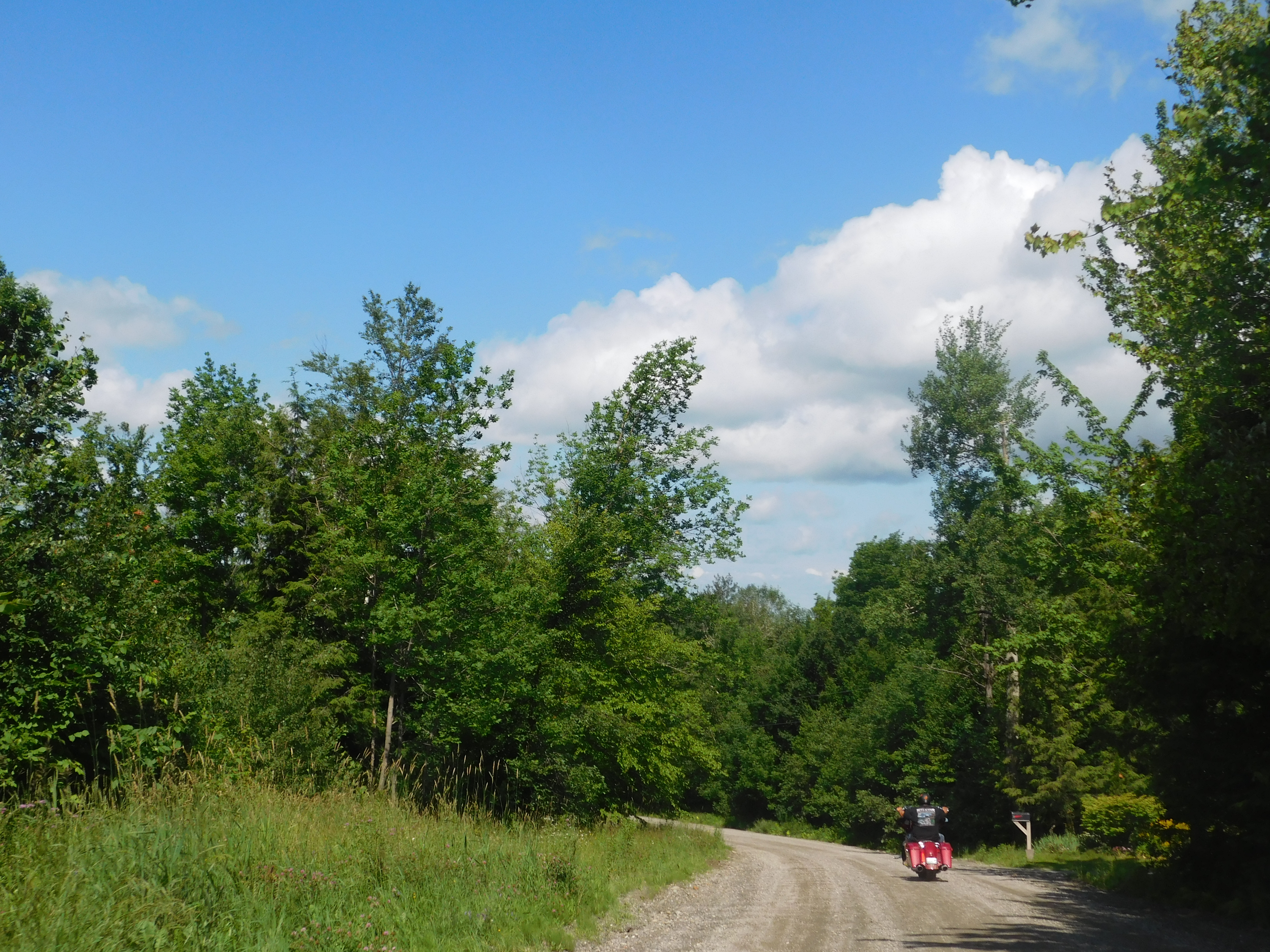
- Vermont Route 58 through Hazen's Notch.
- Interactive map of Hazen's Notch
- Elevation: 546.4 metres (1,793 ft)
- Traversed by: VT 58

Third Approach
- Location: Orleans County, Vermont, United States
- Range: Green Mountains
- Coordinates: 44°50.45′N 72°31.39′W
- Topo map: USGS Hazen's Notch

Hazen's Notch is a mountain pass in Westfield, in the northern Green Mountains of Vermont. Hazen's Notch was named after Moses Hazen, who in 1779 led the construction of the Bayley Hazen Military Road. The road was planned to extend from Newbury, Vermont, to Saint-Jean-sur-Richelieu, Quebec, not far from Montreal, to facilitate an invasion of Canada during the American Revolutionary War; it had reached this point when construction stopped.

The notch is defined by the cliffs of Sugarloaf Mountain to the north and by Haystack Mountain to the south. The height of land of the pass is located in Hazen's Notch State Park, in Orleans County, about 0.5 miles (0.80 km) east of the boundary between Orleans and Franklin Counties. Located on the south side of the road at the height of land in Hazen's Notch is a stone tablet inscribed with the words "Terminus of the Hazen Road, 1779" which was placed there by the Orleans County Historical Society on August 21, 1903.

The geology of the Hazen's Notch area in Westfield and Montgomery is primarily Hazen's Notch Formation of schist with intrusions of Belvidere Mountain Amphibolite and two areas of ultramafic rocks all of which grades into Jay Peak Formation in the lower elevations.

On the east side, Hazen's Notch drains into the East Branch of the Missisquoi River, which drains into Lake Champlain, thence into Canada's Richelieu River, the Saint Lawrence River, and into the Gulf of Saint Lawrence. To the west, the gap is drained by Wade Brook, which drains into the Trout River, thence the Missisquoi River.

The Long Trail, a 272-mile (438-km) hiking trail running the length of Vermont, crosses Hazen's Notch between Haystack Mountain, 1.5 mi (2.5 km) to the south, and Sugarloaf Mountain immediately to the north.

The State of Vermont has designated 273 acres (110 ha) as the Hazen's Notch Natural Area. The Long Range Management Plan emphasizes protection of natural resources while allowing for undeveloped recreation. The plan includes a detailed geological, natural, cultural and recreational history of Hazen's Notch.

== See also ==
- Bayley Hazen Military Road
- Moses Hazen
