= Peacham, Vermont =

- Town
- Peacham, Vermont, from the north

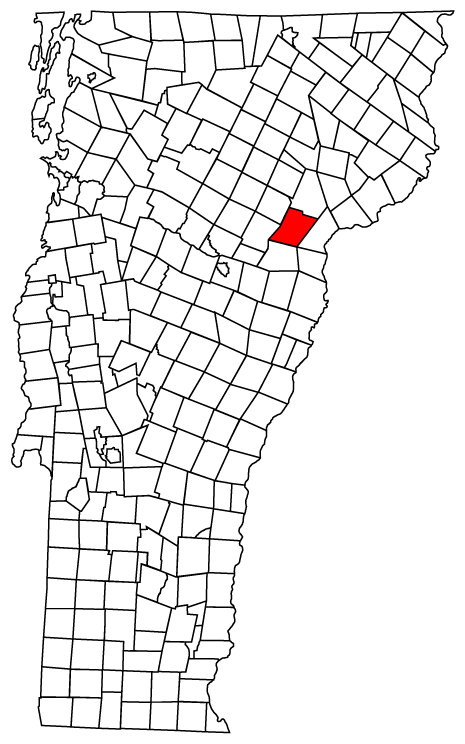
- Location of Peacham in Vermont
- Coordinates: 44°20′16″N 72°12′20″W
- Country: United States
- State: Vermont
- County: Caledonia
- Communities: Peacham; East Peacham; Ewells Mills; Green Bay; South Peacham

Area
  - Total: 47.7 sq mi (123.5 km^{2})
  - Land: 46.6 sq mi (120.8 km^{2})
  - Water: 1.0 sq mi (2.7 km^{2})
- Elevation: 1,795 ft (547 m)

Population (2020)
  - Total: 715
  - Density: 15/sq mi (5.9/km^{2})
- Time zone: UTC-5 (Eastern (EST))
  - Summer (DST): UTC-4 (EDT)
- ZIP codes: 05862 (Peacham); 05821 (Barnet); 05873 (West Danville); 05046 (Groton)
- Area code: 802
- FIPS code: 50-54400
- GNIS feature ID: 1462171
- Website: www.peacham.net

Peacham is a town in Caledonia County, Vermont, United States. The population was 715 at the 2020 census.

== History ==
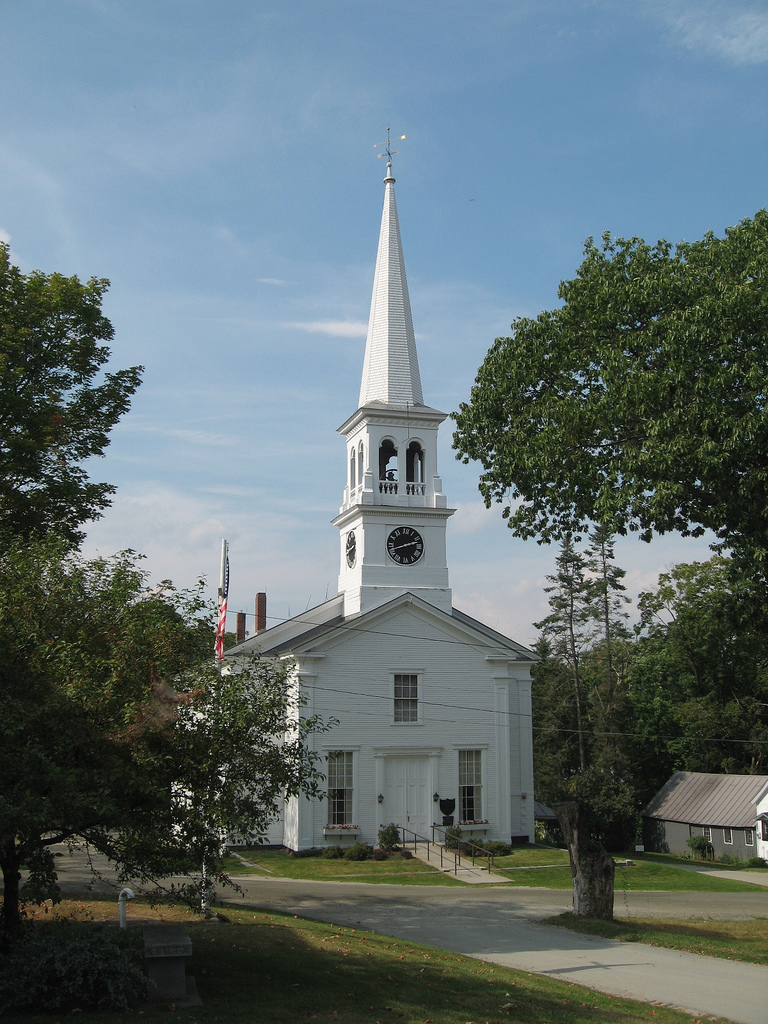
Peacham Congregational Church

In 1763, Governor Benning Wentworth of New Hampshire gave a charter for the region to a group of proprietors, and the town was given the name Peacham (the etymology of the name is unclear). The original proprietors were speculators who surveyed the town, laid a few rudimentary roads, and divided it into lots, though the territory remained unsettled for some time.

In 1775, settlers, primarily from Connecticut and Massachusetts, bought the lots and built homes, developing the land for agriculture. The original settlers survived almost entirely through subsistence farming despite the long winters, hilly terrain, and rocky soil. Nine years later, records show a population of approximately 200 people. The first recorded town meeting took place in 1784, and selectmen were duly elected to govern the affairs of the town. Peacham was early on presented with a choice of having either the county courthouse or the county school, and the residents voted for the school. In 1795 the Caledonia County Grammar School received its charter, and the first school was established in a log structure on the Bayley Hazen Road, halfway between Peacham Corner and South Peacham.

In 1799, a library was established, which traveled from store to store. A congregational church was founded in 1794—the first pastor, Leonard Worcester, was well known for his fiery sermons. His son Samuel went on to be an important missionary to the Cherokee people, creating the first typeface for the Cherokee alphabet and gaining lasting fame as the plaintiff in the supreme court case Worcester v. Georgia.

Early residents, who came to be known as Peachamites, traded butter, eggs, and wheat for goods which they could not make at home, and also relied on the production and sale of items such as whiskey and potash to help augment the relatively poor harvests. Almost from the beginning, various trades and industries—as many as 30–35 at a given time—flourished. Lumbering, coopering, milling, butter making, tin ware, tanneries and leather goods provided goods for local consumption. From 1800 to 1830, sheep farming flourished as a more profitable endeavor than growing crops. In 1840, the town reached its greatest population of 1,443. From that date on, census numbers steadily declined. Farming methods changed, and dairy farming came to replace sheep. The larger, more industrially advanced farms of the late 19th century could not support large families, and youth began to leave home.

In the 20th century, the population continued to decline to a low in the mid-600s. Farming also became less common due to competition with larger dairy farms in the West, and many farms either consolidated or went under. Tourism became important during the 20th century as people opened their homes to visitors from the cities of the Atlantic seaboard, often derisively referred to as "flatlanders". With the advent of the railroad in Barnet and then motor vehicles, Peacham became a popular location for summer residents, some of whom were educators from Boston and New York City. In the second half of the 20th century, Peacham became a popular vacation spot and retirement home for prominent intellectuals and liberal thinkers—individuals such as David Dellinger, William Lederer, Roman Jakobson, and the historian Shepard Clough all owned houses in town. Their interests and stimulation enhanced the cultural interests of the town.

== Geography ==
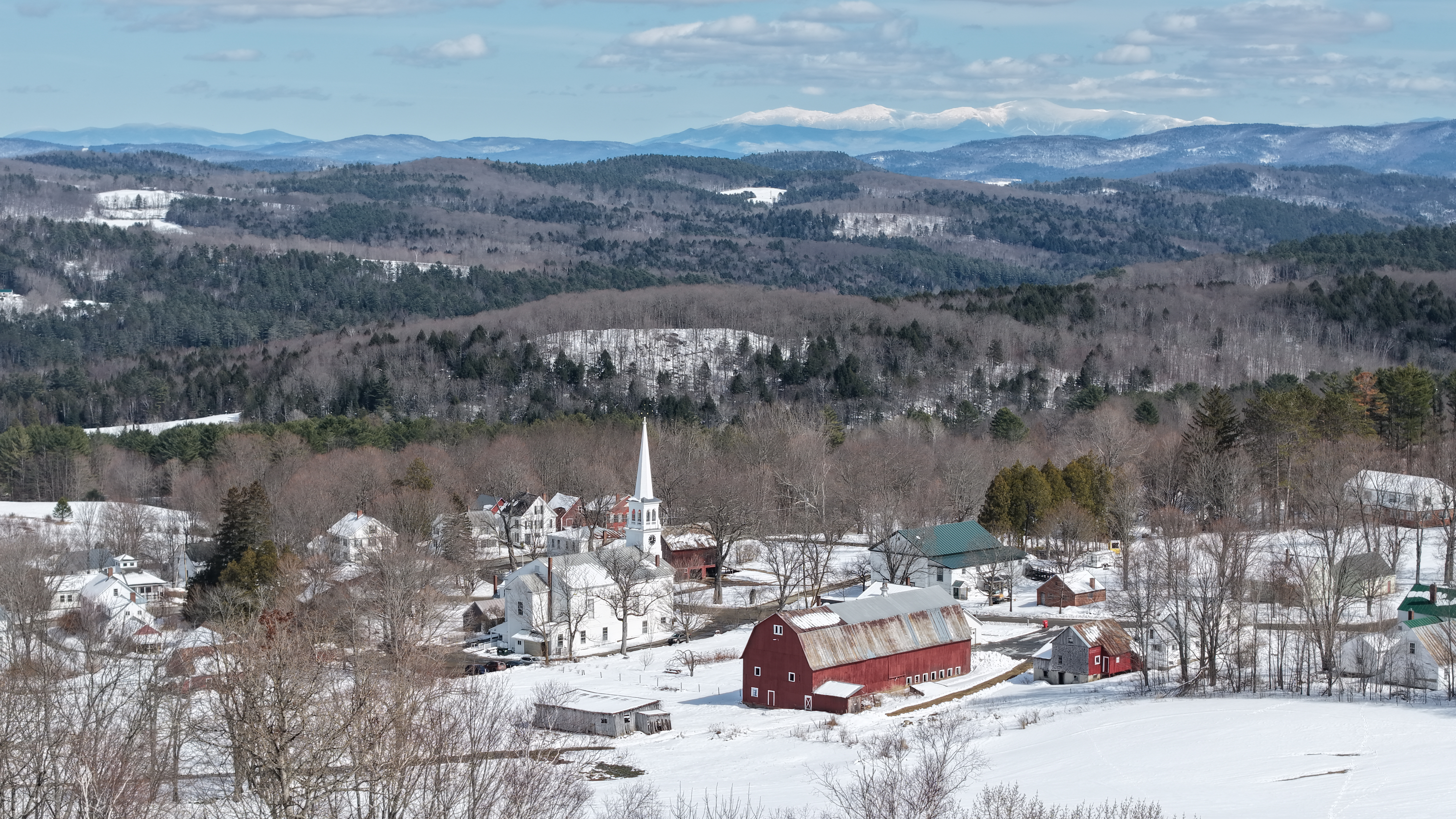
Peacham, Vermont, from the west, with the White Mountains of New Hampshire in the background

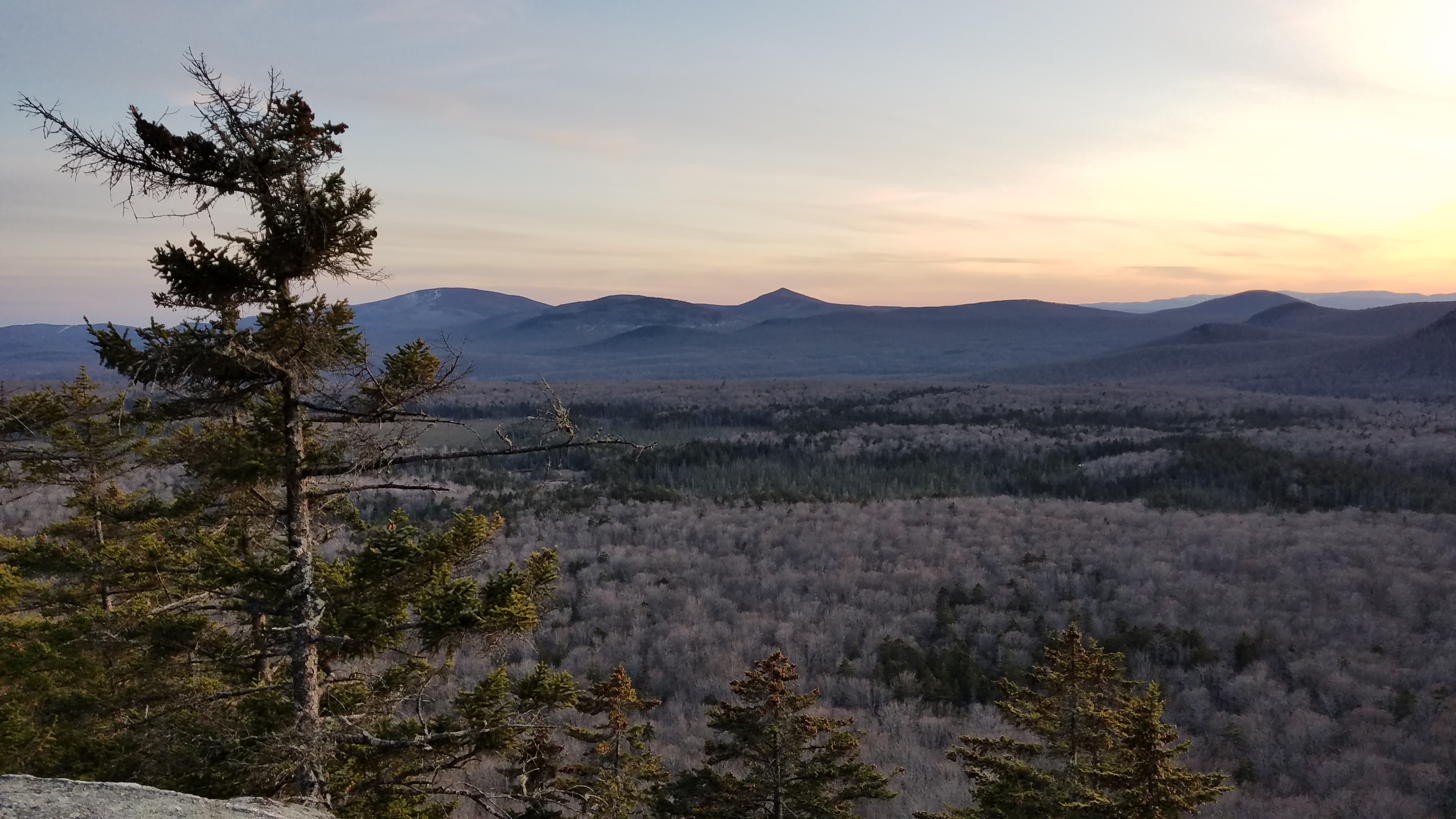
View from Devils Hill over Groton State Forest in western Peacham

According to the United States Census Bureau, the town has a total area of 47.7 square miles (123.5 km^{2}), of which 46.6 square miles (120.8 km^{2}) is land and 1.0 square mile (2.7 km^{2}), or 2.18%, is water. Neighboring towns are Danville to the north, Barnet to the east, Ryegate to the southeast, Groton to the south, Marshfield to the west, and Cabot to the northwest. No numbered state highways pass through the town.

The highest point in Peacham is the 2,566-foot (782 m) summit of Cow Hill near the northern corner of town.

== Demographics ==
Historical population
Census	Pop.	Note	%±
1790	365		—
1800	873		139.2%
1810	1,301		49.0%
1820	1,294		−0.5%
1830	1,351		4.4%
1840	1,443		6.8%
1850	1,377		−4.6%
1860	1,247		−9.4%
1870	1,141		−8.5%
1880	1,041		−8.8%
1890	892		−14.3%
1900	794		−11.0%
1910	777		−2.1%
1920	657		−15.4%
1930	620		−5.6%
1940	543		−12.4%
1950	501		−7.7%
1960	433		−13.6%
1970	446		3.0%
1980	531		19.1%
1990	627		18.1%
2000	665		6.1%
2010	732		10.1%
2020	715		−2.3%
U.S. Decennial Census

As of the census of 2010, there were 732 people, 299 households, and 213 families residing in the town. The population density was 15.7 people per square mile (6.1 per square kilometer). There were 542 housing units at an average density of 11.6 per square mile (4.5 per square kilometer). The racial makeup of the town was 98.0% White (717), 0.4% African American (3), 0.5% Native American or Alaska Native (4), 0.1% some other race (1), and 1.0% two or more races (7). Hispanic or Latino of any race were 0.4% of the population (3). There were no Asians.

There were 299 households, out of which 25.8% had children under the age of 18 living with them, 8.0% had a female householder with no husband present, and 28.8% were non-families. 25.1% of all households were made up of individuals, and 11.7% were someone living alone who was 65 years of age or older. The average household size was 2.45, and the average family size was 2.90.

In the town, the population was largely older with a median age of 48.5. Of the total population, 81.5% were 16 or older. Under the age of 5 were 4.8%, 6.9% were between 15 and 19, 13.1% between 25 and 44, 34.7% between 45 and 64, and 17.4% were 65 years of age or older, with 4.7% were 80 or older. For every 100 females, there were 92.1 males. The population was 48.0% male and 52.0% female.

For the period 2007–2011, the estimated median annual income for a household in the town was $62,344, and the median income for a family was $81,719. Male full-time workers had a median income of $45,078 versus $43,958 for females. The per capita income for the town was $30,373. About 1.7% of families and 5.4% of the population were below the poverty line, including none under age 18 and 15.0% of those age 65 or over.

== Culture ==
The Peacham Historical Association (PHA) has been preserving records since 1916. The PHA has published a number of works on the town and has archives which chronicle the town's history from 1776.

The Peacham Library is a private library founded in 1810 as a resource for the debating team of the Caledonia County Grammar School. For the first century of its existence, the library possessed no fixed location and rotated from store to store around the town. The original library building was purchased in 1909. It burned in 1959, destroying almost the entire collection. The current library was constructed on the same location in 1960 and enlarged in 2001. The library has over 9,200 volumes and over 500 registered patrons.

Peacham has hosted the yearly Peacham Acoustic Music Festival since 2011, typically in mid-August. Other yearly events include the Fall Foliage celebration and the yearly July 4 festivities, including the traditional tractor parade.

In September 2005, Peacham was designated "Best New England Village" by Yankee magazine, which wrote, "Of all the villages in New England, Peacham (population 665) is unsurpassed."

== Points of interest ==
=== On the National Register of Historic Places ===
- Elkins Tavern (oldest structure)
- Peacham Corner Historic District
- Josiah and Lydia Shedd Farmstead
- New Discovery State Park

=== Other points of interest ===
- Ashbel Goodenough Blacksmith Shop – a 19th-century blacksmith shop which has been restored by the Peacham Historical Association with a working wooden forge
- Ski-Tow Hill – operational in the 1960–1976
- Devil's Hill
- Widow Jennison Road
- Martin's Pond
- Martin's Pond Saw Mill (Location was on north side of access road. Spillway is still visible, but dry.)
- Peacham Pond
- Cemetery Hill (Academy Hill)
- Peacham Bog, a 748-acre (3.03 km^{2}) bog
- Cow Hill (highest point in town)
- Bayley-Hazen Military Road
- Peacham Congregational Church
- The Civil War Soldiers Monument with the names of 42 men from town who died in the war
- Peacham Observatory (ruins can be seen near Lookout Mountain)
- Northern Skies Observatory, operated by the Northeast Kingdom Astronomy Foundation

== Education ==
The town operates Peacham Elementary.

The following schools once operated in town, but have been closed:

- Peacham Academy (formerly the Caledonia County Grammar School, closed in 1971)
- Yellow School House
- Three Corners School House
- East Peacham School House
- The Stevens School of Peacham (this school has since moved to Lyndonville; its Peacham school building is now defunct)
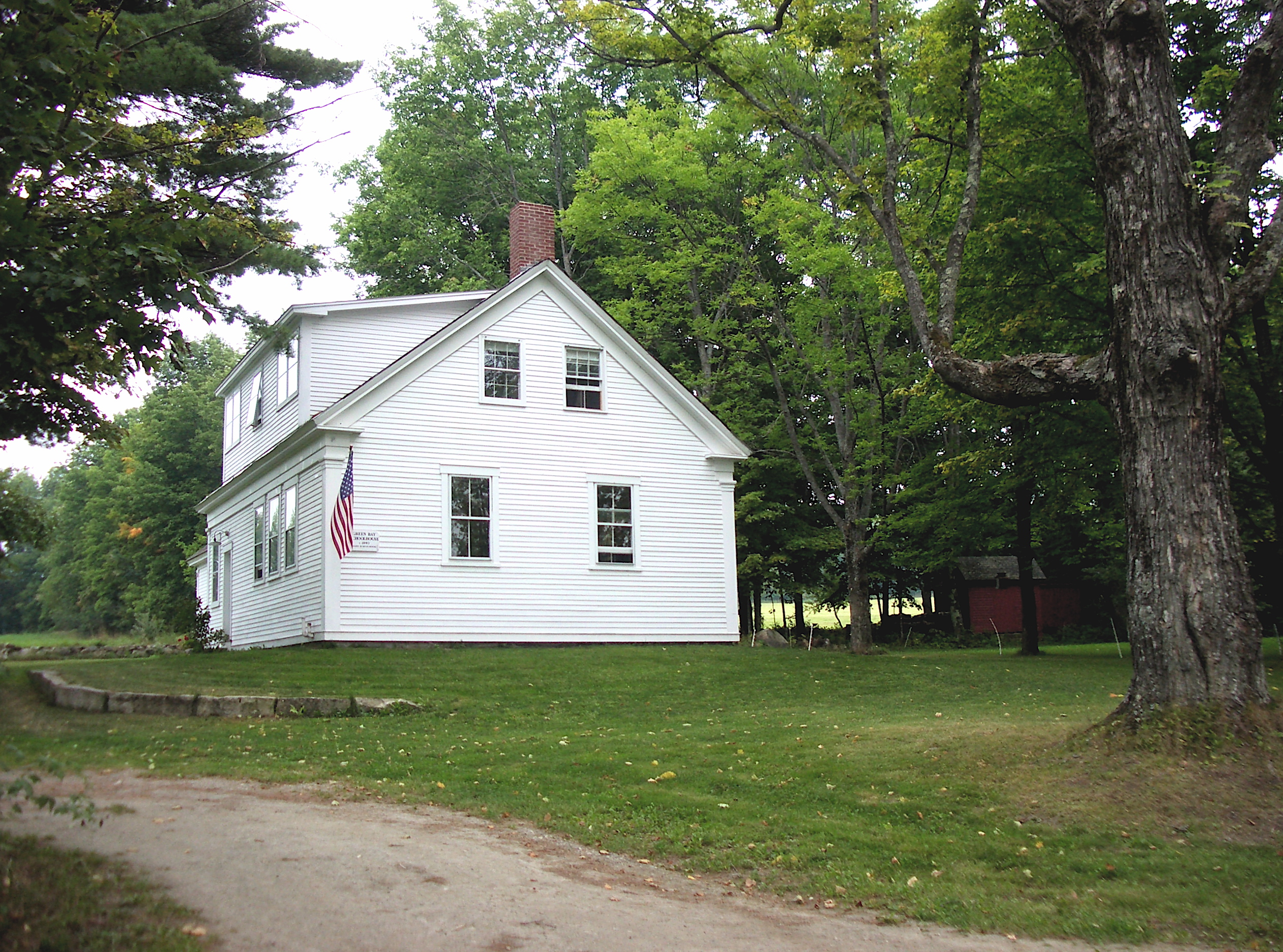
Yellow School House

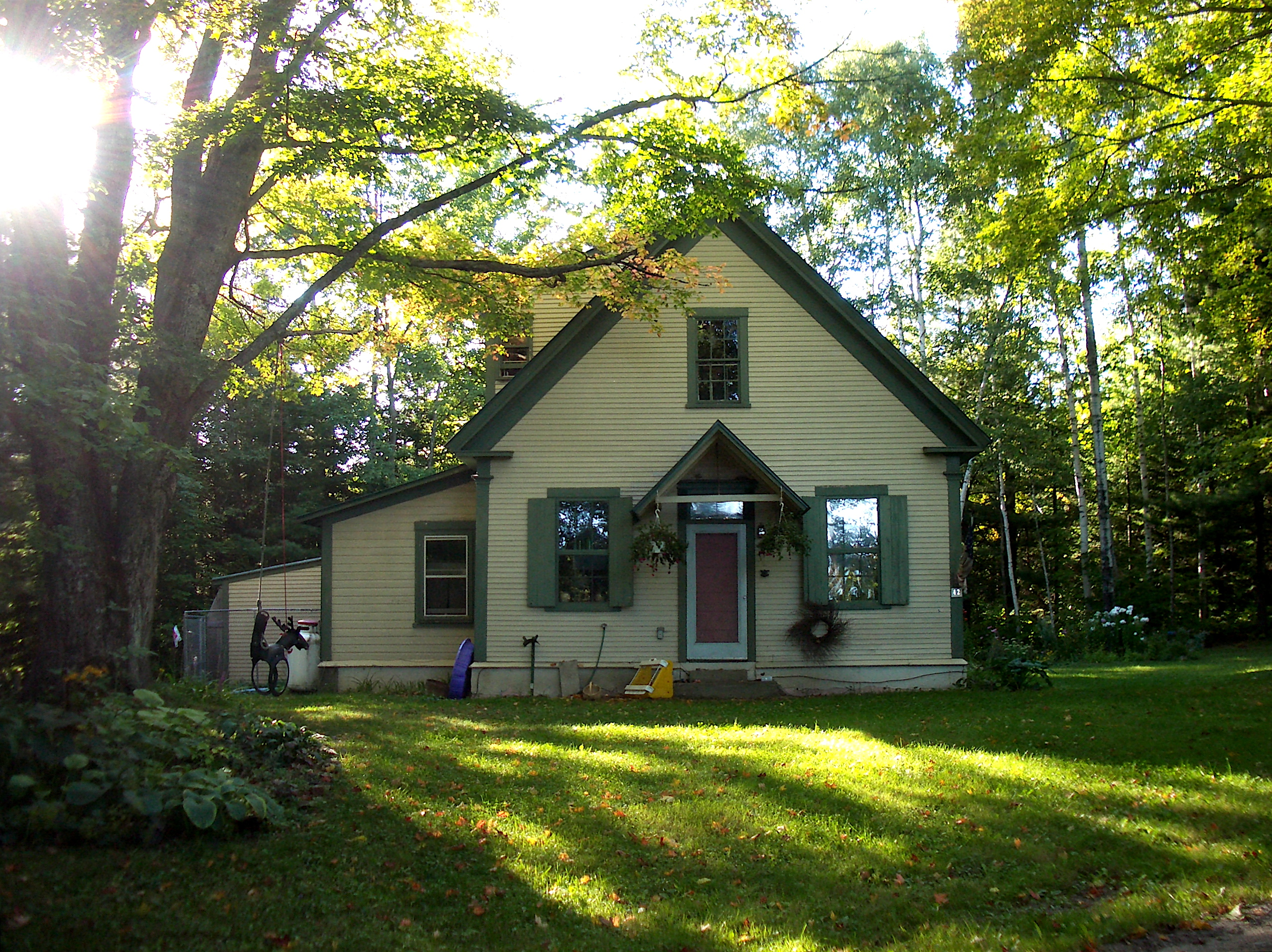
Three Corners School House

== Films ==
A number of movies have been filmed in Peacham. These include:

- A Return to Salem's Lot (1987)
- Ethan Frome (1993)
- Where the Rivers Flow North (1993)
- The Spitfire Grill (1996)

== Notable people ==
- Edward Behr, writer and publisher of The Art of Eating quarterly
- William Chamberlain, US congressman
- Alexander Dunnett, US Attorney for Vermont, Caledonia County State's Attorney
- George Harvey, US Ambassador to Great Britain
- John Martin, steamboat captain and businessman
- John Mattocks, Whig politician and the 16th governor of Vermont
- Samuel Merrill, early leading citizen of Indiana
- Thaddeus Stevens, abolitionist and politician
- Samuel Worcester, missionary and plaintiff in Worcester v. Georgia

=== Summer residents and retirees ===
- Harry G. Barnes, Jr., US ambassador, retired to Peacham
- David Dellinger, pacifist and member of the Chicago Seven
- James B. Engle, diplomat and conservationist
- Alger Hiss, US diplomat and suspected Soviet spy
- Roman Jakobson, Russian linguist and literary theorist
- William Lederer, most famous for co-authoring the novel The Ugly American.
