= 26th Continental Regiment =

Massachusetts regiment of the US Revolutionary War 1776

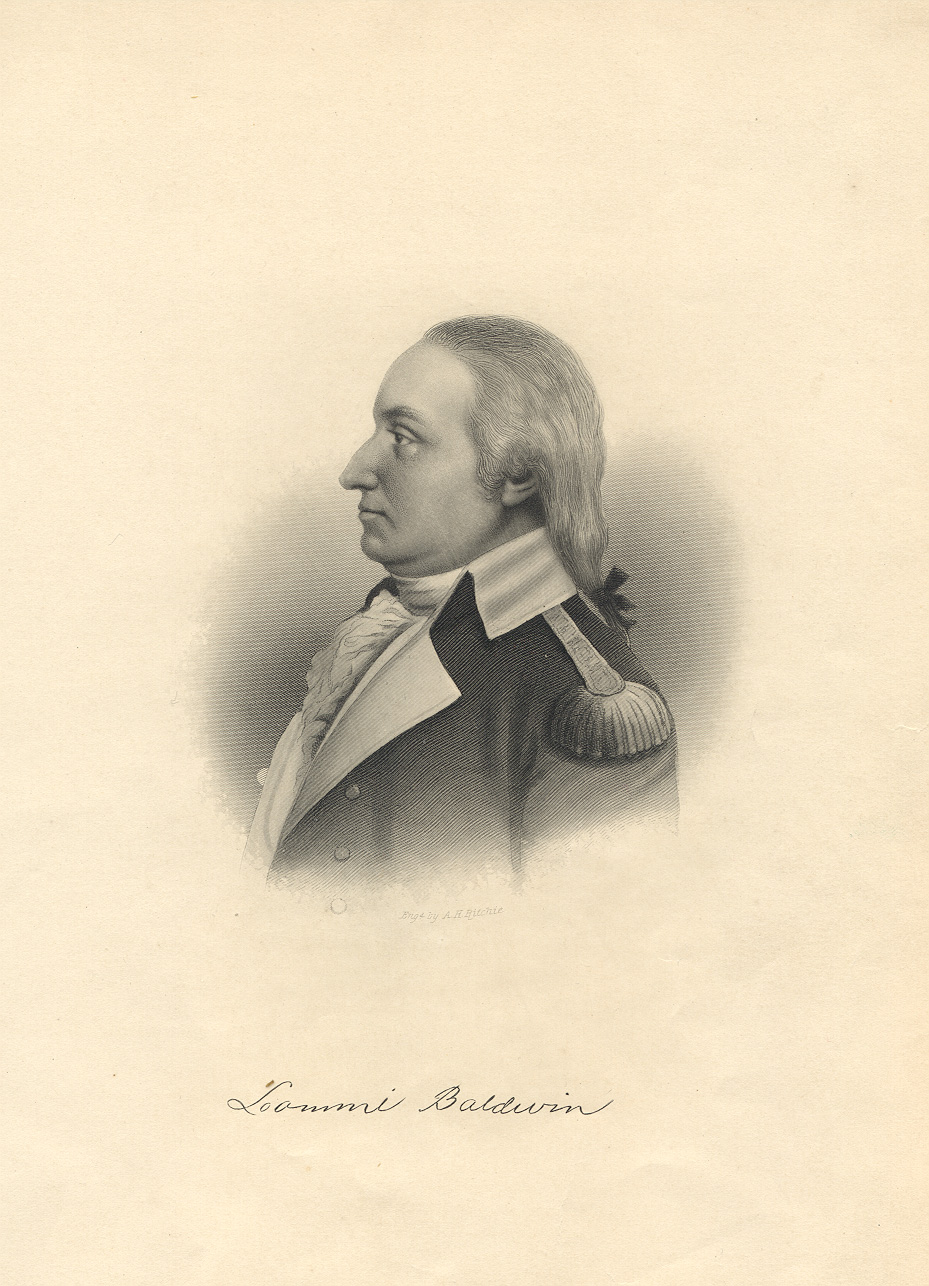
- Colonel Loammi Baldwin
- Active: 1775–1777
- Allegiance: Continental Congress of the United States
- Type: Infantry
- Role: Infantry
- Size: 318
- Part of: Massachusetts Line
- Nickname: George Washington
- Engagements: Siege of Boston; New York and New Jersey campaign Battle of Trenton

Commanders
- Notable commanders: Colonel Loammi Baldwin

The 26th Continental Regiment (previously known as Gerrish's Regiment and later known as the 9th Massachusetts Regiment) was an infantry unit of the Massachusetts Line during the American Revolutionary War. Gerrish's Regiment was raised in the early days of the war, and the regiment underwent name changes as the Continental Army was reorganized in 1776 and 1777. From 1777 onward, the unit was known as the 9th Massachusetts Regiment.

== 1775 history ==
In January 1776 the 26th Continental Regiment was organized from the remnant of Gerrish's Regiment, also known in the 1775 army establishment as the 25th Massachusetts. It was at first commanded by Colonel Samuel Gerrish, of Newbury, who was dismissed from the service for cowardice, after he hid in his tent during the battle. On 17 August 1775, the Continental Army court-martialed Gerrish on the charge “That he behaved unworthy an Officer.” With Gen. Nathanael Greene presiding, a panel of officers found him guilty and ordered him “to be cashiered, and render’d incapable of any employment in the American Army.” Gen. George Washington approved that sentence on 19 August.

Command of the regiment passed to its next senior officer, Lieutenant Colonel Loammi Baldwin, of Woburn. Baldwin commanded the 25th Massachusetts Bay Provincial Regiment in 1775 during the Siege of Boston. To form the new unit, the old regiment had to be reduced from ten companies to eight. Command of the newly formed 26th Continental Regiment was given to Baldwin, who was promoted to the rank of Colonel on January 1, 1776.

== 1776 history ==
In a report dated January 8, 1776, at Cambridge Camp, Colonel Baldwin reported the following roster of officers for his newly organized regiment, in addition to himself and his second in command, Lieutenant Colonel James Wesson. He also noted that he had no chaplain. Each line of this report represents a company of the regiment.

Officers of the 26th Continental Regiment
Captains	1st Lieutenants	2nd Lieutenants	Ensigns
Thomas Mighill	Thomas Cummings	Mark Cressey	Amos Bailey
Thomas Cogswell	Moses Dunton	Amos Cogswell	James Walker
Richard Dodge	Paul Dodge	Michael Farley (Quartermaster)	Abijah Hastings
Isaac Sherman	Caleb Robinson	Michah Hoit	Ebenezer Light
John Wood	Abraham Child	Nathan Dix	Sylvannus Wood
Barnabas Dodge	Joseph Cheever	Joseph Knight	Joseph Edes
Ezra Badlam	Samuel Carr	John Noyes	Wadleigh Noyes
Joseph Pettingill	Samuel Thomson	John Woodward (Adjutant)	Joseph Walker

In 1776, Congress authorized an infantry regiment to consist of three field officers, a small staff, and eight line companies. Each company had 4 officers and 2 musicians, 8 noncommissioned officers, and 76 privates. These soldiers were evenly divided into four squads if the unit was at full strength. The combat strength of a fully manned Continental Infantry Regiment in 1776 was 640 privates and corporals all armed with muskets. The 32 officers and 32 sergeants provided a favorable ratio of one supervisor to ten rank and file for maintaining company-level control. The total strength would be 728.

Many of the men of Gerrish's Regiment were now members of the 26th Continental Regiment and had seen action at Bunker Hill in 1775. The newly formed regiment assisted efforts to lift the siege of Boston the following year. In early March 1776, the cannons captured at Fort Ticonderoga had been moved to Boston by the heroic efforts of Henry Knox. The guns were placed on Dorchester Heights in a swift, overnight action ranging the British positions. British forces, led by General Howe, evacuated the city on March 17, 1776, and sailed to Canada. In April, General Washington took most of the Continental Army to fortify New York City.

Baldwin's regiment remained with the Main Army. The 26th Continental Regiment moved to New York City in April 1776 and became part of Heath's Brigade there. On August 12, 1776, the 26th Regiment was transferred to Clinton's Brigade. The regiment's strength report for September 1776 showed a strength of 318, including 23 officers, 35 non-commissioned officers, 5 staff officers, and 255 privates.

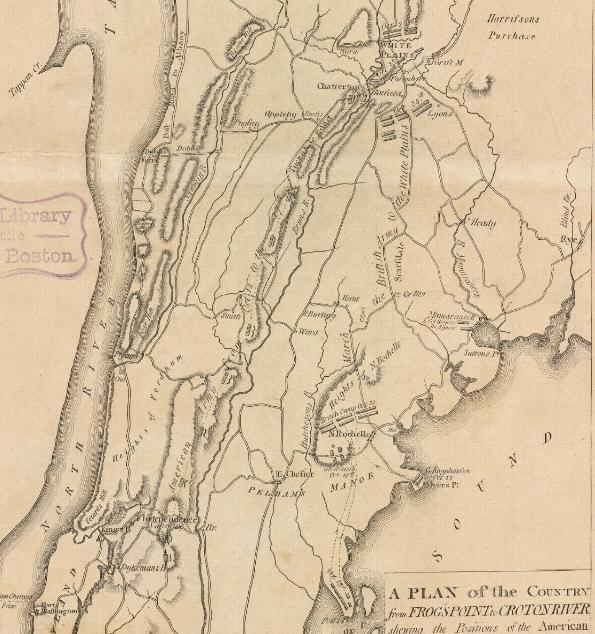
The British movements from Pell's Point to White Plains.

The regiment saw action on Long Island and distinguished itself at the Battle of Throg's Neck and the Battle of Pell's Point, holding off a much larger British force to allow George Washington to withdraw from Manhattan to White Plains. The regiment then joined Washington in White Plains for that battle.

The 26th Regiment also served at Trenton. On the night of December 25, 1776, in the face of a violent and extremely cold storm of snow and hail, General Washington and his army crossed the Delaware to the New Jersey side and fought the Battle of Trenton. Baldwin and his regiment participated in both the crossing and the fight.

== Equipment ==
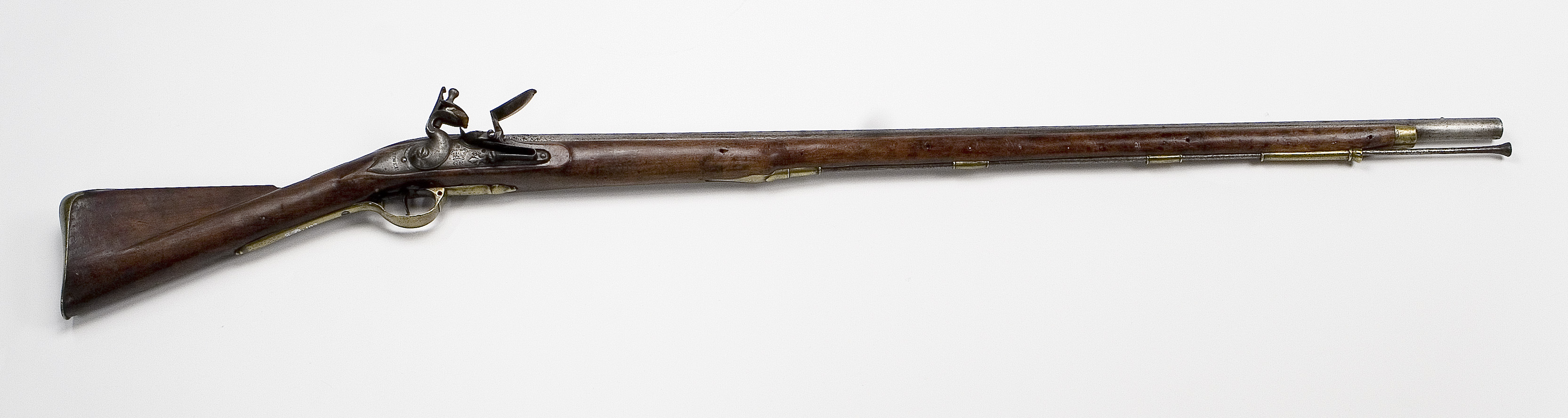
A British Short Land Pattern Musket

The 26th Regiment uniform was brown coats with buff facings similar to the British. They wore waistcoats and breeches of white cloth. The 26th was one of the first regiments of the Continental Army to outfit a grenadier company. Under the command of Captain Thomas Mighill, the company wore the traditional grenadier's miter cap. One of these caps has survived in the Smithsonian collections. The Roman numerals 'XXVI' and the cipher 'GW,' for George Washington, are embroidered on the front. For this reason, the regiment was referred to as the "George Washington Regiment."

Captain Mighill rearmed his grenadiers in July 1776 with Short Land Pattern Muskets and bayonets that had been captured from the British.

== 1777 reorganization ==
In 1777, the 9th Massachusetts Regiment was formed by consolidating the remnant of the 21st Continental Regiment with the remnant of the 26th Continental Regiment. Colonel Baldwin was forced to retire due to ill health. The new commanding officer of the 9th Regiment, James Wesson, had been a major of Gerrish's Regiment in 1775 and the lieutenant colonel of the 26th Continental Regiment in 1776.

The regiment had two, successive commanders: Colonel Wesson, from November 1, 1776, to January 1, 1781; and Colonel Henry Jackson, from the latter date to January 1, 1783. The regiment was a part of Learned's Brigade, which consisted of the 2nd Mass, 8th Mass, the 9th and, some say, the 1st Canadian Regiment. When in battle formation, the regiment was always positioned in the second line of the left wing, between the 3rd Mass and the 6th Mass. Overall command was by Major General Stirling.

The regiment served in what was known as the Northern Department during the war. It participated at Fort Stanwix, Saratoga and Valley Forge. At Valley Forge (1777–1778), under the command of Col. Wesson and assisted by Lt. Col. James Mellen, it was incorporated into Major General DeKalb's division.

It is known that the issued regimental coat should have had red facings but, due to the shortage of dyed material, buff facings were most likely substituted. Recent information suggests blue coats with white buff facings, green or plaid waistcoats, buff trousers and buckled shoes. Research of the regiment is ongoing.

== Legacy ==
The Ninth Massachusetts Regiment is a group of revolutionary war reenactors. The group was formed in 1975 in Braintree, Massachusetts, under its original name the Braintree 3rd Volunteer Militia. During the "great event" celebration, of July 4, 1976, a call went out to recreate the major events of the revolution. The group acquired the correct clothing and equipment of the American Continental Army.

In 1996, one of its members, Geoff Campbell, founded the End Zone Militia, a group of reenactors which regularly appears at Gillette Stadium in Foxborough for Patriots and Revolution home games and fires blanks each time the Patriots or Revolution score.

== Lineage ==
Preceded by Gerrish's Regiment; Commander: Colonel Samuel Gerrish	26th Continental Regiment; Commander: Colonel Loammi Baldwin	Succeeded by 9th Massachusetts Regiment; Commander: Colonel James Wesson

== See also ==
- Brown Bess
