= Massachusetts Line =

Units of the Continental Army during the American Revolutionary War

The Massachusetts Line was those units within the Continental Army that were assigned to Massachusetts at various times by the Continental Congress during the American Revolutionary War. These, together with similar contingents from the other twelve states, formed the Continental Line. Line regiments were assigned to a particular state, which was then financially responsible for the maintenance (staffing and supplying) of the regiment. The concept of the line was also particularly important in relation to the promotion of commissioned officers. Officers of the Continental Army below the rank of brigadier general were ordinarily ineligible for promotion except in the line of their own state.

The size of the Massachusetts Line varied from as many as 27 active regiments (at the outset of the war) to four (at its end). For most of the war after the siege of Boston (April 1775 to March 1776) almost all of these units were deployed outside Massachusetts, serving as far north as Quebec City, as far west as present-day central Upstate New York, and as far south as Yorktown, Virginia. Massachusetts line troops were involved in most of the war's major battles north of Chesapeake Bay, and were present at the decisive siege of Yorktown in 1781. General officers of the line included Major Generals Artemas Ward, William Heath, and Benjamin Lincoln, and Brigadier Generals John Glover and John Nixon.

== History ==
The line's history began in the immediate aftermath of the Battles of Lexington and Concord in April 1775, after which the Massachusetts Provincial Congress raised 27 regiments as a provincial army. These units, which were mostly organized by mid-May, were adopted into the first establishment of the Continental Army in June 1775. These units were generally referred to by the names of their colonels, and were numbered one way by the state and another by the Continental Army.

At the end of 1775 the army was reorganized into its second establishment; a number of Massachusetts units were disbanded, but some were retained and others established. In the 1776 establishment regiments from the northern states identified as Continental regiments. At the end of 1776 the army was again reorganized. The third establishment restored a state-based regimental numbering scheme which was retained until the end of the war. After two major reorganizations (at the start of 1781 and 1783) the army was almost completely disbanded in November 1783, leaving a single regiment under the command of Massachusetts Colonel Henry Jackson.

== Non-line units ==
Not all Continental infantry regiments raised were part of a state quota. On December 27, 1776, the Continental Congress gave Washington temporary control over certain military decisions that the Congress ordinarily regarded as its own prerogative. These "dictatorial powers" included the authority to raise sixteen additional Continental infantry regiments at large.

Early in 1777, Washington offered command of one of these additional regiments to David Henley of Massachusetts, who accepted. Henley had been adjutant general on the staffs of Generals William Heath and Joseph Spencer, and was briefly lieutenant colonel of the 5th Massachusetts Regiment.

Washington also offered command of an additional regiment to William Raymond Lee of Massachusetts, who accepted. In 1776, Lee had been the major of John Glover's famous Marblehead regiment, the 14th Continental Regiment.

Finally, Washington offered command of an additional regiment to Henry Jackson of Massachusetts, who accepted. These three regiments were raised in Massachusetts in the spring of 1777. Much of the recruiting for them was done in the Boston area, which until then had been unable to raise troops because of the British occupation.

Henley's and Lee's Regiments were consolidated into Jackson's Regiment on April 9, 1779. Jackson's Regiment was allotted to the Massachusetts Line on July 24, 1780, and officially designated the 16th Massachusetts Regiment. The 16th Massachusetts Regiment was disbanded on January 1, 1781. Colonel Jackson remained in service until 1784, leading the last remaining regiment in the Continental Army.

== 1775 establishment ==
On April 23, 1775, the Massachusetts Provincial Congress voted to raise a volunteer force of 13,600 men, and it called upon the other New England colonies for assistance in raising an army of 30,000 men. The Massachusetts provincials were raised in the spring of 1775 and were eventually formed into twenty-six infantry regiments. Massachusetts also took responsibility for a twenty-seventh regiment, originally raised in New Hampshire. Massachusetts regiments had an official establishment of 599 officers and men in ten companies (but five regiments had an eleventh company). The troops were enlisted to serve until December 31, 1775. The commissions of all Massachusetts officers were dated May 19, 1775. Subsequently, the regiments were numbered, although in Massachusetts the regiment was commonly identified by the name of its colonel.

The New England delegates to the Continental Congress urged that the Congress assume responsibility for the provincial troops of New Hampshire, Massachusetts, Rhode Island, and Connecticut, that were blockading Boston. This was done on June 14, 1775, and these troops were designated the Continental Army. George Washington was selected as commander in chief of this force, and all other Continental Army troops, the following day.

In an effort to weld the separate New England armies into a single "Continental" Army, on August 5, 1775, General Washington ordered that a board be convened to determine the rank of the regiments at Boston. The board was to consist of a brigadier general as moderator and six field officers as members. It completed its task on August 20, 1775, and reported its decision to Washington. The regiments of infantry in the Continental Army were accordingly numbered without reference to their colony of origin. There were thirty-nine "Regiments of Foot in the Army of the United Colonies." In General Orders, Washington often referred to his regiments by these numbers; and they appear in the strength reports compiled by Adjutant General Horatio Gates.

Name	Colonel	Massachusetts Number	Continental Number	Summary
Ward's	Artemas Ward; Jonathan Ward	1st	32nd	This regiment was initially commanded by General Artemas Ward of Shrewsbury, who was the commanding general of the Massachusetts Bay provincial forces. His general authority over the troops from the other New England colonies was acknowledged, and he commanded the patriot army at Boston until the arrival of George Washington at Cambridge on July 3, 1775. On June 17, 1775, Ward was made a major general in the Continental Army - the first appointment in that grade. Command of the regiment passed to its next senior officer, Lieutenant Colonel Jonathan Ward, of Southborough, who was promoted to the rank of colonel on that date. It served in the siege of Boston, and was designated the 21st Continental Regiment in the 1776 establishment.
Thomas'; Bailey's	John Thomas; John Bailey	2nd	35th	This regiment was initially commanded by General John Thomas, of Kingston, who was the lieutenant general (second in command) of the Massachusetts Bay provincial forces. Thomas was made a Continental brigadier general on June 22, 1775. The regiment's lieutenant colonel, John Bailey, of Hanover, then assumed command. Bailey was promoted to the rank of colonel on July 1, 1775, and the regiment became Bailey's Regiment. It served in the siege of Boston, and was designated the 23rd Continental Regiment in the 1776 establishment.
Walker's	Timothy Walker	3rd	22nd	This regiment was commanded by Colonel Timothy Walker, of Rehoboth, who served as colonel until the end of the year. It served in the siege of Boston, and was merged into Read's Regiment in December 1775.
Cotton's	Theophilus Cotton	4th	16th	This regiment was commanded by Colonel Theophilus Cotton, of Plymouth, who served as colonel until the end of the year. It served in the siege of Boston, and was disbanded at the end of 1775, when its companies were divided amongst other Massachusetts regiments. Cotton continued to serve in the Massachusetts militia.
Whitcomb's	Asa Whitcomb	5th	23rd	This regiment contained eleven companies and had an official establishment of 658 officers and men. It was commanded by Colonel Asa Whitcomb, who served as colonel until the end of the year. It served in the siege of Boston until its disbandment at the end of 1775. Whitcomb took command of the 6th Continental Regiment in 1776.
Read's	Joseph Read	6th	20th	This regiment was commanded by Colonel Joseph Read, of Uxbridge, who served as colonel until the end of the year. It served in the siege of Boston, and was designated the 13th Continental Regiment in the 1776 establishment.
Mansfield's	John Mansfield	7th	19th	This regiment was commanded by Colonel John Mansfield, of Lynn, who left the service on September 15, 1775. From then until the end of the year the regiment was commanded by Lieutenant Colonel Israel Hutchinson, of Danvers. It served in the siege of Boston, and was designated the 27th Continental Regiment in the 1776 establishment.
Danielson's	Timothy Danielson	8th	18th	This regiment contained eleven companies and had an official establishment of 658 officers and men. It was commanded by Colonel Timothy Danielson, of Brimfield, who served as colonel until the end of the year. It served in the siege of Boston until its disbandment at the end of 1775. Most of the regiment was consolidated into Learned's Regiment, which became the 3rd Continental Regiment in the 1776 establishment.
Prescott's	William Prescott	9th	10th	This regiment contained eleven companies and had an official establishment of 658 officers and men. It was commanded by Colonel William Prescott, of Pepperell, who served as colonel until the end of the year. It served in the siege of Boston, and was designated the 7th Continental Regiment in the 1776 establishment.
Frye's	James Frye	10th	1st	This regiment was commanded by Colonel James Frye, of Andover, who served as colonel until the end of the year. It served in the siege of Boston until its disbandment at the end of 1775.
Bridge's	Ebenezer Bridge	11th	27th	This regiment contained eleven companies and had an official establishment of 658 officers and men. It was commanded by Colonel Ebenezer Bridge, of Billerica, who served as colonel until the end of the year. It served in the siege of Boston until its disbandment at the end of 1775.
Paterson's	John Paterson	12th	26th	This regiment contained eleven companies and had an official establishment of 658 officers and men. It was commanded by Colonel John Paterson, of Lenox, who served as colonel until the end of the year. It served in the siege of Boston, and was designated the 15th Continental Regiment in the 1776 establishment.
Scammon's	James Scammon	13th	30th	This regiment was commanded by Colonel James Scammon. His regiment was raised in what were then known as the "eastern counties," the present state of Maine. Scammon served as colonel of the regiment until the end of the year. It served in the siege of Boston until its disbandment at the end of 1775. Its companies were then divided among three other regiments, principally the 18th Continental Regiment.
Learned's	Ebenezer Learned	14th	4th	This regiment was commanded by Colonel Ebenezer Learned, of Oxford, who served as colonel until the end of the year. It served in the siege of Boston, and was designated the 3rd Continental Regiment in the 1776 establishment.
Gardner's; Bond's	Thomas Gardner; William Bond	15th	37th	This regiment was commanded by Colonel Thomas Gardner. He was mortally wounded at the Battle of Bunker Hill, June 17, 1775, and died July 3, 1775. On that date the regiment's commander, Lieutenant Colonel William Bond, was promoted to the rank of colonel. It served in the siege of Boston, and was designated the 25th Continental Regiment in the 1776 establishment.
Nixon's	John Nixon	16th	5th	This regiment was commanded by Colonel John Nixon, of Framingham and Sudbury, who served as colonel until the end of the year. It served in the siege of Boston, and was designated the 4th Continental Regiment in the 1776 establishment.
Fellows'	John Fellows	17th	8th	This regiment was commanded by Colonel John Fellows, of Sheffield, who served as colonel until the end of the year. It served in the siege of Boston until its disbandment at the end of 1775. Most of its companies were consolidated into Ward's Regiment, which became the 21st Continental Regiment.
Doolittle's	Ephraim Doolittle	18th	24th	This regiment was commanded by Colonel Ephraim Doolittle, who left the service in October 1775. Command of the regiment passed to its next senior officer, Lieutenant Colonel Benjamin Holden, of Princeton. It served in the siege of Boston until its disbandment at the end of 1775.
J. Brewer's	Jonathan Brewer	19th	6th	This regiment was commanded by Colonel Jonathan Brewer, of Waltham, who served as colonel until the end of the year. It served in the siege of Boston, and was designated the 6th Continental Regiment in the 1776 establishment.
D. Brewer's	David Brewer	20th	9th	This regiment was commanded by Colonel David Brewer, of Palmer, who was dismissed from the service on October 24, 1775. The next senior officer, Lieutenant Colonel Rufus Putnam, of Brookfield, assumed command of the regiment and served until the end of the year. It served in the siege of Boston until its disbandment at the end of 1775. Most of its companies were consolidated into Read's Regiment, which became the 13th Continental Regiment in the 1776 establishment.
Heath's; Greaton's	William Heath; John Greaton	21st	36th	This regiment was commanded by Colonel William Heath, of Roxbury. Heath was made a Continental brigadier general on June 22, 1775, and command of the regiment passed to Lieutenant Colonel John Greaton. Greaton was promoted to the rank of colonel on July 1, 1775, and the regiment became Greaton's Regiment. It served in the siege of Boston, and was designated the 24th Continental Regiment in the 1776 establishment.
Woodbridge's	Benjamin Ruggles; Woodbridge	22nd	25th	This regiment was commanded by Colonel Benjamin Ruggles Woodbridge, of South Hadley, who served as colonel until the end of the year. It served in the siege of Boston until the end of 1775, when it left Continental service. Woodbridge and his regiment remained active in the Massachusetts militia, serving (among other actions) in the 1777 Saratoga campaign.
Glover's	John Glover	23rd	21st	This regiment was commanded by Colonel John Glover, of Marblehead, who served as colonel until the end of the year. It served in the siege of Boston until its disbandment. In December 1775, Glover's Regiment was stationed at Beverly to defend the naval base located there. The regiment was designated the 14th Continental Regiment in the 1776 establishment.
Little's	Moses Little	24th	17th	This regiment was commanded by Colonel Moses Little, of Newbury, who served as colonel until the end of the year. It served in the siege of Boston, and was designated the 12th Continental Regiment in the 1776 establishment.
Gerrish's	Samuel Gerrish	25th	38th	This regiment was commanded by Colonel Samuel Gerrish, of Newbury, who was dismissed from the service on August 19, 1775. Command of the regiment passed to its next senior officer, Lieutenant Colonel Loammi Baldwin, of Woburn. It served in the siege of Boston, and was designated the 26th Continental Regiment (with Baldwin promoted to colonel) in the 1776 establishment.
Phinney's	Edmund Phinney	26th	31st	This regiment was commanded by Colonel Edmund Phinney, whose regiment was raised in the present state of Maine. Phinney served as colonel until the end of the year. It served in the siege of Boston, and was designated the 18th Continental Regiment in the 1776 establishment.
Sargent's	Paul Dudley Sargent	27th	28th	This regiment was commanded by Colonel Paul Dudley Sargent, of Amherst, New Hampshire. Sargent served as colonel until the end of the year. It served in the siege of Boston, and was designated the 16th Continental Regiment in the 1776 establishment.

== 1776 establishment ==
On November 4, 1775, the Continental Congress resolved that on January 1, 1776, the Continental Army, exclusive of artillery and extra regiments, was to consist of 27 infantry regiments. The troops were to be enlisted to serve until December 31, 1776. The quota of regiments assigned to the states was 1 from Pennsylvania, 3 from New Hampshire, 16 from Massachusetts, 2 from Rhode Island, and 5 from Connecticut.

Each regiment was to have an official establishment of 728 officers and men in eight companies. The regiments were to receive numbers instead of names. For the campaign of 1776 Massachusetts was to provide the 3d, 4th, 6th, 7th, 12th, 13th, 14th, 15th, 16th, 18th, 21st, 23d, 24th, 25th, 26th, and 27th Continental Regiments.

The reduction of the Massachusetts Line from an establishment of 16,468 officers and men in 275 companies to an establishment of 11,648 officers and men in 128 companies required a difficult reorganization.

The numbered Continental regiments raised in Massachusetts were widely scattered in the campaign of 1776. In April, following the British evacuation of Boston, five regiments (the 6th, 14th, 16th, 18th, and 27th) were ordered to remain in Massachusetts, four of them occupying Boston. Three of these regiments (the 14th, 16th, and 27th) joined the Main Army in July. The 6th and 18th regiments joined the Northern Army in August, and never rejoined the Main Army. Of the eleven regiments that moved to New York City in April, three regiments (the 15th, 24th, and 25th) were ordered to Canada as reinforcements. One of these regiments (the 15th) rejoined the Main Army in November, and served at Trenton and Princeton. The 24th and 25th regiments, that had served in the Northern theater, also rejoined the Main Army in November, but marched directly to the army's winter quarters at Morristown, New Jersey. Finally, the 7th Continental Regiment, which served in Parsons' Brigade, was assigned to the Highlands Department in November.

Name	Colonel	Summary
3rd Continental	Ebenezer Learned; William Shepard	This regiment was formed by consolidating the remnant of Danielson's Regiment, and the remnant of Wood's Company, Cotton's Regiment, with the remnant of Learned's Regiment. Colonel Ebenezer Learned commanded this regiment from January until May 1776, when he resigned due to poor health. The regiment was then commanded by Lieutenant Colonel William Shepard for the remainder of the year, but Shepard was not appointed Colonel until October. As a regiment on the right wing of the army at Boston, it was ordered to furnish details for the Fortification of Dorchester Heights Learned's regiment remained with the Main Army, moving to New York City in April. Under Shepard's command, it served at the battles of Pell's Point, Trenton and Princeton. It was designated the 4th Massachusetts Regiment in the 1777 establishment.
4th Continental	John Nixon; Thomas Nixon	This regiment was formed by consolidating the remnant of Thompson's Company, Danielson's Regiment, with the remnant of Nixon's Regiment. Colonel John Nixon commanded this regiment until August 9, 1776, the date on which he was promoted to brigadier general. On that date the regiment's next senior officer, Lieutenant Colonel Thomas Nixon, assumed command with the rank of colonel. Nixon's regiment remained with the Main Army, moving to New York City in April. It served at Trenton and Princeton. It was designated the 6th Massachusetts Regiment in the 1777 establishment.
6th Continental	Asa Whitcomb	This regiment was formed by consolidating the remnants of Soul's Company, Fellows' Regiment, and Danforth's Company, David Brewer's Regiment, with the remnant of Jonathan Brewer's Regiment. However, Jonathan Brewer left the service, and command of this regiment was given to Colonel Asa Whitcomb, whose old regiment was disbanded. As a regiment on the right wing of the army at Boston, it was ordered to furnish details for the Fortification of Dorchester Heights. Whitcomb's regiment occupied Boston in April 1776. In August it was ordered to northern New York to oppose Carleton's counteroffensive, and never rejoined the Main Army. It was designated the 13th Massachusetts Regiment in the 1777 establishment.
7th Continental	William Prescott	This regiment was formed by consolidating the remnants of Darby's and Nowell's Companies, Scammon's Regiment, and the remnant of Morse's Company, Paterson's Regiment, with the remnant of Prescott's Regiment. Colonel William Prescott commanded this regiment throughout 1776. Prescott's regiment remained with the Main Army, moving to New York City in April. In November it was stationed in the Hudson Highlands. It was disbanded at the end of 1776, with some remnants joining the 2nd Massachusetts Regiment.
12th Continental	Moses Little	This regiment was formed by reducing Little's Regiment from ten companies to eight. Colonel Moses Little commanded this regiment throughout 1776. Little's regiment remained with the Main Army, moving to New York City in April. It served at Trenton and Princeton. It was disbanded afterward.
13th Continental	Joseph Read	This regiment was formed by consolidating the remnants of Walker's Regiment and David Brewer's Regiment with the remnant of Read's Regiment. Colonel Joseph Read commanded this regiment throughout 1776. As a regiment on the right wing of the army at Boston, it was ordered to furnish work details for the Fortification of Dorchester Heights. Read's regiment remained with the Main Army, moving to New York City in April. It served at Trenton and Princeton. It was disbanded afterward.
14th Continental	John Glover	This regiment was formed from by reducing Glover's Regiment from ten companies to eight. Colonel John Glover commanded this regiment throughout 1776. Glover's regiment continued to be stationed at Beverly until July, when it was ordered to join the Main Army at New York City. The regiment served at Trenton, and played significant roles in the aftermath of the Battle of Long Island and George Washington's crossing of the Delaware River. It was disbanded at the end of 1776.
15th Continental	John Paterson	This regiment was formed by consolidating the remnants of Sayer's and Sullivan's Companies, Scammon's Regiment, with the remnant of Paterson's Regiment (less the remnants of Morse's and Watkins' Companies). Colonel John Paterson commanded this regiment throughout 1776. Paterson's regiment remained with the Main Army, moving to New York City in April. In the same month it was ordered to reinforce the American army in Canada. In November the regiment rejoined the Main Army and served at Trenton and Princeton. It was designated the 1st Massachusetts Regiment in the 1777 establishment.
16th Continental	Paul Dudley Sargent	This regiment was formed by reducing Sargent's Regiment from ten companies to eight. Colonel Paul Dudley Sargent commanded this regiment throughout 1776. Sargent's regiment occupied Boston in April 1776. It was ordered to join the Main Army at New York City in July. The regiment served at Trenton and Princeton. It was designated the 8th Massachusetts Regiment in the 1777 establishment.
18th Continental	Edmund Phinney	This regiment was formed by consolidating the remnants of Scammon's Regiment and Watkins' Company, Paterson's Regiment, with the remnant of Phinney's Regiment. Colonel Edmund Phinney commanded this regiment throughout 1776. Phinney's regiment occupied Boston in April 1776. In August it was ordered to northern New York to oppose Carleton's counteroffensive, and never rejoined the Main Army. It was designated the 12th Massachusetts Regiment in the 1777 establishment.
21st Continental	Jonathan Ward	This regiment was formed by consolidating the remnant of Fellows' Regiment, and the remnants of Benson's and Bradford's Companies, Cotton's Regiment, with the remnant of Ward's Regiment. Colonel Jonathan Ward commanded this regiment throughout 1776. As a regiment on the right wing of the army at Boston, it was ordered to furnish details for the Fortification of Dorchester Heights. Ward's regiment remained with the Main Army, moving to New York City in April. It served at Trenton and Princeton. It was disbanded afterward.
23rd Continental	John Bailey	This regiment was formed by consolidating the remnant of Cotton's Regiment (less the remnants of Benson's, Bradford's, Mayhew's, and Wood's Companies) with the remnant of Bailey's Regiment. Colonel John Bailey commanded this regiment throughout 1776. As a regiment on the right wing of the army at Boston, it was ordered to furnish details for the Fortification of Dorchester Heights. Bailey's regiment remained with the Main Army, moving to New York City in April. It served at Trenton and Princeton. It was designated the 2nd Massachusetts Regiment in the 1777 establishment.
24th Continental	John Greaton	This regiment was formed by consolidating the remnant of Crafts' Company, Bond's Regiment, with the remnant of Greaton's Regiment. Colonel John Greaton commanded this regiment throughout 1776. Greaton's regiment remained with the Main Army, moving to New York City in April. In the same month it was ordered to reinforce the American army in Canada. The regiment rejoined the Main Army in November, marching directly to Morristown. It was designated the 3rd Massachusetts Regiment in the 1777 establishment.
25th Continental	William Bond; Ichabod Alden	This regiment was formed by consolidating the remnants of Mayhew's Company, Cotton's Regiment, and Egery's Company, Danielson's Regiment, with the remnant of Bond's Regiment (less the remnant of Crafts' Company). Colonel William Bond commanded this regiment until his death on August 31, 1776. The regiment's next senior officer, Lieutenant Colonel Ichabod Alden, held command until the end of the year. Bond's regiment remained with the Main Army, moving to New York City in April. In the same month it was ordered to reinforce the American army in Canada. The regiment rejoined the Main Army in November, marching directly to Morristown. The regiment was disbanded at the end of 1776.
26th Continental	Loammi Baldwin	This regiment was formed from by reducing Gerrish's Regiment from ten companies to eight. This regiment was commanded by Colonel Loammi Baldwin, who was promoted to that rank on January 1, 1776. Baldwin's regiment remained with the Main Army, moving to New York City in April. It served at Trenton and Princeton. It was designated the 9th Massachusetts Regiment in the 1777 establishment.
27th Continental	Israel Hutchinson	This regiment was formed from by reducing Mansfield's Regiment from ten companies to eight. This regiment was commanded by Colonel Israel Hutchinson, who was promoted to that rank on January 1, 1776. Hutchinson's regiment remained with the Main Army, moving to New York City in April. It served at Trenton and Princeton. It was designated the 5th Massachusetts Regiment in the 1777 establishment.

=== Disbanded 1775 units ===
The remnants of the regiments of Asa Whitcomb, James Frye, Ebenezer Bridge, Ephraim Doolittle, and Benjamin Ruggles Woodbridge were disbanded at Cambridge, Massachusetts, on December 31, 1775.

== 1777 establishment ==
During 1776, the Continental Congress gradually overcame its ideological objections to a standing army, and, on September 16, 1776, it resolved that, on January 1, 1777, the Continental Line was to consist of 88 infantry regiments, to be maintained for the duration of the war. The quota of regiments assigned to the states was 3 from New Hampshire, 15 from Massachusetts, 2 from Rhode Island, 8 from Connecticut, 4 from New York, 4 from New Jersey, 12 from Pennsylvania, 1 from Delaware, 8 from Maryland, 15 from Virginia, 9 from North Carolina, 6 from South Carolina, and 1 from Georgia. The quotas for states outside New England included regiments that had been on the Continental establishment earlier, but the term Continental Line was now broadened to include the lines of all the states.

Name	Colonels	Summary
1st Massachusetts	Joseph Vose	This regiment (also sometimes referred to as Vose's Regiment) was formed by consolidating two companies from the 6th Continental Regiment, and two companies formed from the 18th Continental Regiment, with the remnant of the 15th Continental Regiment. The commanding officer, Colonel Joseph Vose, had been the major of Greaton's Regiment in 1775 and the lieutenant colonel of the 24th Continental Regiment in 1776. As the 15th Continental Regiment, reorganizing as the 1st Massachusetts Regiment, it served in St. Clair's Brigade at Princeton. Reorganization was completed in the spring of 1777, and the regiment was ordered to Peekskill in the Highlands. On July 10, 1777, it was assigned to the 2d Massachusetts Brigade under Brigadier General Glover. The regiment served in the Saratoga campaign, then marched south to join Washington in the Middle Department. It served in the Philadelphia campaign and wintered at Valley Forge. In 1778 it served in the Monmouth campaign, then at Rhode Island. Following Rhode Island the regiment was stationed in the Highlands, but in 1781 its light company was assigned to Lieutenant Colonel Elijah Vose's Battalion, Corps of Light Infantry, which served in the Yorktown campaign. The regiment was disbanded at West Point, New York, on November 3, 1783.
2nd Massachusetts	John Bailey	This regiment was formed by consolidating the remnants of the 7th Continental Regiment; Peters' Company, 13th Continental Regiment; and Clap's Company, 21st Continental Regiment; with the remnant of the 23d Continental Regiment. (Peters' and Clap's Companies were reorganized, respectively, as Warren's and Dunham's Companies, Bailey's Regiment). The commanding officer, Colonel John Bailey, had been the lieutenant colonel, later the colonel, of Thomas's Regiment in 1775 and colonel of the 23rd Continental Regiment in 1776. As the 23rd Continental Regiment, reorganizing as the 2nd Massachusetts Regiment, it served in Glover's Brigade at Princeton. Reorganization was completed in the spring of 1777, and the regiment was ordered to the Northern Department. In the summer of 1777 it was assigned to the 4th Massachusetts Brigade under Brigadier General Learned. The regiment retreated toward Saratoga after the American evacuation of Fort Ticonderoga in July, and marched under Arnold to the relief of Fort Stanwix in August. Following the Saratoga campaign the regiment marched south to join Washington in the Middle Department. It served in the Philadelphia campaign and wintered at Valley Forge. In 1778 it served in the Monmouth campaign. After November 1778 the regiment was stationed in the Highlands, but in 1781 its light company was assigned to Lieutenant Colonel Elijah Vose's Battalion, Corps of Light Infantry, which served in the Yorktown campaign. The regiment was disbanded at West Point, New York, on November 3, 1783.
3rd Massachusetts	John Greaton	This regiment was formed by consolidating the remnant of the 25th Continental Regiment with the remnant of the 24th Continental Regiment (less the remnants of Bent's and Whiting's Companies; the latter were reorganized as Fairfield's and Pillsbury's Companies, Wigglesworth's Regiment). The commanding officer, John Greaton, had been the lieutenant colonel of Heath's Regiment, and its commander, in 1775. In 1776 he commanded the 24th Continental Regiment. The regiment was disbanded on November 5, 1783.
4th Massachusetts	William Shepard	This regiment was formed by consolidating the remnant of King's Company, 21st Continental Regiment, with the remnant of the 3rd Continental Regiment. (King's Company was redesignated Alvord's Company). The commanding officer, William Shepard, had been the lieutenant colonel of Danielson's Regiment in 1775 and the lieutenant colonel and later colonel of the 3rd Continental Regiment in 1776. He was wounded at the Battle of Pell's Point on October 18, 1776. The regiment was disbanded on November 5, 1783.
5th Massachusetts	Rufus Putnam	This regiment was formed by consolidating the remnant of Walbridge's Company, 13th Continental Regiment, with the remnant of the 27th Continental Regiment. (Walbridge's Company was reorganized as Goodale's Company). The commanding officer, Rufus Putnam, had been the lieutenant colonel of David Brewer's Regiment in 1775. The regiment was furloughed on June 12, 1783, and disbanded without reforming on November 15, 1783.
6th Massachusetts	Thomas Nixon; Benjamin Tupper	This regiment was formed by reconstituting the remnant of the 4th Continental Regiment as a regiment to serve for the duration. The commanding officer, Thomas Nixon, had been the lieutenant colonel of John Nixon's Regiment in 1775 and lieutenant colonel of the 4th Continental Regiment in 1776. He was promoted to colonel on August 9, 1776. Colonel Benjamin Tupper was commanding officer of the 6th Massachusetts Regiment from January 1, 1783, until June 12, 1783. The regiment was furloughed on June 12, 1783, and disbanded without reforming on November 15, 1783.
7th Massachusetts	Ichabod Alden	This regiment was a new organization, raised under the Eighty-Eight Battalion Resolve of September 16, 1776. The commanding officer, Ichabod Alden, had been the lieutenant colonel of Cotton's Regiment in 1775 and lieutenant colonel of the 25th Continental Regiment in 1776. He was killed at Cherry Valley, New York, on November 10, 1778, and his lieutenant colonel, William Stacy was taken prisoner. The regiment was furloughed on June 12, 1783, and disbanded without reforming on November 15, 1783.
8th Massachusetts	Michael Jackson	This regiment was formed by reconstituting the remnant of the 16th Continental Regiment as a regiment to serve for the duration. The commanding officer had been the major of Gardner's Regiment in 1775, and was wounded on June 17, 1775, at the Battle of Bunker Hill. In 1776 he was lieutenant colonel of the 16th Continental Regiment and was wounded at Montresor's Island on September 24, 1776. The regiment was furloughed on June 12, 1783, and disbanded without reforming on November 15, 1783.
9th Massachusetts	James Wesson	This regiment was formed by consolidating the remnant of the 21st Continental Regiment (less the remnants of Clap's and King's Companies) with the remnant of the 26th Continental Regiment. The commanding officer, James Wesson, had been the major of Gerrish's Regiment in 1775 and the lieutenant colonel of the 26th Continental Regiment in 1776. He was wounded on June 28, 1778, at the Battle of Monmouth, New Jersey. The regiment was disbanded on January 1, 1783.
10th Massachusetts	Thomas Marshall; Benjamin Tupper	This regiment was a new organization, raised under the Eighty-Eight Battalion Resolve of September 16, 1776. The commanding officer, Thomas Marshall, had been an officer in the Massachusetts militia. Colonel Benjamin Tupper was commanding officer of the 10th Massachusetts Regiment from January 1, 1781, until January 1, 1783, when the regiment was disbanded.
11th Massachusetts	Ebenezer Francis; Benjamin Tupper	This regiment was a new organization, raised under the Eighty-Eight Battalion Resolve of September 16, 1776. The regiment's first commander, Colonel Ebenezer Francis, had been a captain of Mansfield's Regiment in 1775. Colonel Francis was killed at the Battle of Hubbardton, Vermont, on July 7, 1777, and was succeeded by Benjamin Tupper. Tupper was colonel of the 11th Massachusetts Regiment from July 7, 1777, until it was disbanded on January 1, 1781.
12th Massachusetts	Samuel Brewer	This regiment was formed by reconstituting the remnant of the 18th Continental Regiment as a regiment to serve for the duration (less two companies consolidated with the 15th Continental Regiment, which became the 1st Massachusetts Regiment). Colonel Samuel Brewer was dismissed from the service on September 17, 1778. For the remainder of its existence the regiment was commanded by Lieutenant Colonel Ebenezer Sproat (aka Sprout), who had been the major of Cotton's Regiment in 1775 and the major of the 3rd Continental Regiment in 1776. The regiment was disbanded on January 1, 1781.
13th Massachusetts	Edward Wigglesworth	This regiment was formed by consolidating the remnants of Bent's and Whiting's Companies, 24th Continental Regiment, with the remnant of the 6th Continental Regiment (less two companies consolidated with the 15th Continental Regiment, which became the 1st Massachusetts Regiment. The commanding officer, Colonel Edward Wigglesworth, had been a militia officer in 1776. The regiment was disbanded on January 1, 1781.
14th Massachusetts	Gamaliel Bradford	This regiment was a new organization, raised under the Eighty-Eight Battalion Resolve of September 16, 1776. The commanding officer, Gamaliel Bradford, had been a militia officer in 1776. The regiment was disbanded on January 1, 1781.
15th Massachusetts	Timothy Bigelow	This regiment was a new organization, raised under the Eighty-Eight Battalion Resolve of September 16, 1776. It was organized by Colonel Timothy Bigelow at Boston, Massachusetts. The regiment would see action at the Battles of Saratoga, Monmouth and Rhode Island. The regiment was disbanded on January 1, 1781, at West Point, New York.
16th Massachusetts	Henry Jackson	This regiment was originally named Henry Jackson's Additional Continental Regiment. On July 24, 1780, it was officially added to the Massachusetts Line and redesignated the 16th Massachusetts. It was disbanded on January 1, 1781.

=== Disbanded 1776 units ===
The remnant of the 12th Continental Regiment, under Colonel Moses Little, was disbanded at Morristown, New Jersey in February 1777.

The remnant of the 13th Continental Regiment, under Colonel Joseph Read, was disbanded at Morristown, New Jersey, in January 1777. However, the remnant of Peters' Company was consolidated with Bailey's Regiment and reorganized as Warren's Company; and the remnant of Walbridge's Company was consolidated with Putnam's Regiment and reorganized as Goodale's Company.

The remnant of the 14th Continental Regiment, under Colonel John Glover, was disbanded in eastern Pennsylvania on December 31, 1776. Glover later returned to the Continental service as a general officer and commanded one of the Continental Army's Massachusetts brigades. His third in command, Major William Raymond Lee, became the colonel of Lee's Additional Continental Regiment.

=== 1778-1779 reorganization ===
While the Main Army, that portion of Washington's army under his immediate command, was in winter quarters at Valley Forge, the Congress acted to reduce the size and increase the tactical efficiency of the Continental Army. On May 27, 1778, it resolved that the number of infantry regiments be reduced from 88 to 80. The quota of regiments assigned to the states was 3 from New Hampshire, 15 from Massachusetts, 2 from Rhode Island, 8 from Connecticut, 5 from New York, 3 from New Jersey, 11 from Pennsylvania, 1 from Delaware, 8 from Maryland, 11 from Virginia, 6 from North Carolina, 6 from South Carolina, and 1 from Georgia. Under this reorganization, the Massachusetts quota was unchanged.

The official establishment of a regiment was reduced to 582 officers and men. Each regiment was to consist of nine rather than eight companies. The ninth company was to be a company of light infantry, and was to be kept up to strength by drafting men from the regiment's eight other companies if necessary. During the campaigning season, the light infantry companies of the regiments in a field army were to be combined into a special corps of light infantry.

Because the Continental Congress passed this resolve at the beginning of the campaigning season, it was nearly a year before this reorganization was completed. The reorganization of the Continental Line was finalized on March 9, 1779.

On July 24, 1780, Henry Jackson's Additional Continental Regiment was officially redesignated the 16th Massachusetts Regiment.

=== 1781 reorganization ===
In October 1780, the Continental Congress, in consultation with General Washington, passed resolutions providing for what would be the last reorganization of the Continental Army before its final disbandment. The Congress determined that on January 1, 1781, the Continental Line was to be reduced from 80 regiments to 50. The quota of regiments assigned to the states was 2 from New Hampshire, 10 from Massachusetts, 1 from Rhode Island, 5 from Connecticut, 2 from New York, 2 from New Jersey, 6 from Pennsylvania, 1 from Delaware, 5 from Maryland, 8 from Virginia, 4 from North Carolina, 2 from South Carolina, and 1 from Georgia. In addition, 1 regiment (Colonel Moses Hazen's Canadian Regiment) was to be raised at large.

Under this reorganization, the Massachusetts quota was reduced from fifteen regiments to ten. Accordingly, the 11th, 12th, 13th, 14th, 15th, and 16th Massachusetts Regiments were disbanded on January 1, 1781.

The official establishment of an infantry regiment was increased to 717 officers and men. Each regiment continued to have nine companies, including a light infantry company, but the companies were made larger. For the first time, each regiment was to have a permanent recruiting party of 1 lieutenant, 1 drummer, and 1 fifer. Thus, there were to be ten recruiting parties in Massachusetts to systematically find and forward recruits to the Massachusetts regiments in the field.

=== Peace negotiations ===
The prolonged period of peace negotiations following the surrender of Lord Cornwallis at Yorktown, on October 19, 1781, presented the Continental Congress with the dilemma of keeping up a military force until the definitive peace treaty was signed, even though the national finances were exhausted. On August 7, 1782, the Continental Congress resolved that the states should reduce their lines on January 1, 1783. Each regiment retained in service was then to contain not less than 500 rank and file.

The preliminary peace treaty was signed on November 30, 1782.

=== 1783 reorganization ===
On January 1, 1783, the 9th Massachusetts Regiment was disbanded at West Point and the 10th Massachusetts Regiment was disbanded at Verplanck's Point, New York, reducing the Massachusetts Line to eight regiments.

Great Britain signed preliminary articles of peace with France and Spain on January 20, 1783, and, on February 4, 1783, Britain announced the cessation of hostilities. The Continental Congress received the text of the preliminary peace treaty on March 13, 1783, and proclaimed the cessation of hostilities on April 11, 1783. It ratified the preliminary peace treaty on April 15, 1783.

In General Orders issued at Newburgh, New York, April 18, 1783, Washington announced that the armistice would go into effect at noon, April 19, 1783 - the eighth anniversary of the battles of Lexington and Concord.

== Demobilization ==
The 5th, 6th, 7th, and 8th Massachusetts Regiments were placed on furlough on June 12, 1783, and were never recalled to active duty.

The final treaty of peace was signed in Paris on September 3, 1783. On October 18, 1783, the Continental Congress proclaimed that Continental troops on furlough were to be discharged on November 3, 1783. The Main Army, with the exception of a small observation force in the Hudson Highlands under the command of General Henry Knox, was disbanded on November 3, 1783. The disbanded units included the 1st, 2nd, 3rd, and 4th Massachusetts Regiments. After this date no part of the Massachusetts Line remained in the field, although the four furloughed regiments were still not formally disbanded.

The Northern Army was disbanded on November 5, 1783, and the Southern Army was disbanded on November 15, 1783. On the latter date the furloughed 5th, 6th, 7th, and 8th Massachusetts Regiments were formally disbanded, and the Massachusetts Line ceased to exist.

New York City was evacuated by British troops on November 25, 1783. The British fleet left New York City on December 4, 1783, and on the same day Washington bid farewell to his officers at Fraunces Tavern.

== First American Regiment of 1784 ==
After November 3, 1783, the Continental Line was reduced to a handful of units. These disbanded in November and December. The single regiment remaining in service after the new year began was under the command of Massachusetts Colonel Henry Jackson, and was known as the 1st American Regiment.

The Continental Congress ratified the Treaty of Paris on January 14, 1784, and the United States and Great Britain exchanged ratifications of the Treaty of Paris on May 12, 1784. The 1st American was disbanded at West Point, New York, on June 2, 1784.
