= Ebenezer Learned =

American general in the Continental Army

- Born: April 18, 1728; Oxford, Massachusetts
- Died: April 1, 1801 (aged 72) Oxford, Massachusetts
- Allegiance: United States
- Branch: Continental Army; Massachusetts Militia
- Service years: 1756–1763, 1775–1776, 1777–1778
- Rank: Brigadier General
- Commands: 3rd Continental Regiment; Ebenezer Learned's brigade (Northern Dept./Valley Forge); (comprising the 2nd Massachusetts Regiment, 8th Massachusetts Regiment, 9th Massachusetts Regiment, & 1st Canadian Regiment)
- Conflicts: French and Indian War; American Revolutionary War: Siege of Boston; Saratoga campaign; Battle of Freeman's Farm; Battle of Bemis Heights
- Spouses: 1. Jerusha Baker; 2. Eliphal Putnam
- Other work: Judge of Common Pleas, Worcester County; Member, Massachusetts General Court; Chairman, Massachusetts Constitutional Convention (1779)

Ebenezer Learned (April 18, 1728 – April 1, 1801) was a brigadier general in the American Continental Army during the Revolutionary War.

== Early life and career ==
He was the son of Ebenezer and Deborah Haynes Learned, and was born at Oxford, Massachusetts. On October 5, 1749, he married Jerusha Baker. They had ten children. When his grandfather died in 1750, he inherited 200 acres (0.8 km^{2}) known as Prospect Hill, and built his home there. Following Jerusha's death, Learned remarried on May 23, 1800, to Eliphal Putnam of Worcester.

Learned was an active member of the local militia, and raised and drilled a company at Oxford during the French and Indian War. In the summer of 1756 he led his company to Fort Edward at Lake George. He fell ill with smallpox in 1757, an event that conferred immunity and would be critical to his later Revolutionary War service.

After that war, he remained at home for several years, farming his land. He was prominent in both church and community, and served as a town selectman for 25 of the years between 1758 and 1794. He also served as "town moderator, assessor and justice of the peace".

== American Revolution ==
He remained active in the militia, and led his own and a neighboring company of minutemen to Boston "Two days after the Battle of Lexington and Concord" on April 19, 1775. On April 24, the Massachusetts committee of safety named him a colonel and authorized him to organize a regiment that was known as Learned's Regiment. His regiment was adopted into the Continental Army in June, and was later designated the 3rd Continental Regiment.

By the end of the Siege of Boston, General Washington had given Learned command of the important Dorchester Heights position. Primary source letters confirm Learned was at "Nuke Hill (Dorchester point)" and in correspondence with Washington regarding the position. When the British evacuated Boston on March 17, 1776, Colonel Learned was the first to enter the city. He led a battalion of 500 men to secure the city. His selection for this duty was a logical military decision, as his 1757 bout with smallpox made him an immune commander for a mission where biological traps were a serious concern.

Learned resigned in May 1776 due to ill health. A 1778 letter and surgeon's certificate later confirmed this "ill health" was a "Breach" (hernia) he "received while he commanded a Regiment... in the year 1775" during the Siege of Boston. This debilitating, service-related injury would plague him for the rest of his career.

He returned to duty on April 2, 1777. He was named a brigadier general and assigned to the Northern Department. In the first phase of the Battle of Saratoga, the Battle of Freeman's Farm, his brigade's performance was ineffective. Military histories note that "Learned's reinforcements got lost in the woods and missed most of the battle."

At the Battle of Bemis Heights his brigade was in the center of the left division, fighting alongside Daniel Morgan and Enoch Poor. They were commanded by General Benjamin Lincoln. Learned's own brigade (the 2nd, 8th, and 9th Massachusetts line), was expanded by James Livingston's 1st Canadian Regiment and 2 regiments of New Hampshire Militia. The attack on the American far left was turned by Daniel Morgan's men, but the enemy's center was held by Hessian troops. Benedict Arnold came onto the field and, "although without command," "took command of Learned's brigade." Arnold and Learned then "led Learned's brigade in an attack against the British center" which "forced the British to give ground" and "broke the enemy lines." Burgoyne's forces had to retreat to their starting fortifications around Freeman's Farm.

In 1777–78, he commanded a brigade of Massachusetts troops in Major General deKalb's division at Valley Forge. His final resignation was a complex matter. While a resignation date of March 24, 1778, is often cited, primary source orderly books prove he was still actively commanding his brigade at Valley Forge as late as May 18, 1778. A letter from Learned to George Washington dated February 7, 1778, reveals he was facing two simultaneous, career-ending crises: his physical inability to serve due to the 1775 "Breach," and a simultaneous "Impeachment" and "complaint" for "conve[r]ting Publick Stores and Plunder to Private use." Physically unfit for duty and facing accusations, he tendered his resignation, which became effective sometime after May 18, 1778.

== Later life and activities ==
Ebenezer returned home to Oxford. His subsequent career suggests he was honorably acquitted of the 1778 allegations, as he was immediately embraced by his community and elevated to high civic posts. He served as the Chairman of the Massachusetts Convention of 1779 that adopted a new constitution for the state. He served as a Judge of Common Pleas for Worcester County, Massachusetts, and in 1783 he was elected to the Massachusetts General Court (the state's House of Representatives).

He died at home in Oxford in 1801.
