= 13th Continental Regiment =

Read's Regiment 13th Continental Regiment
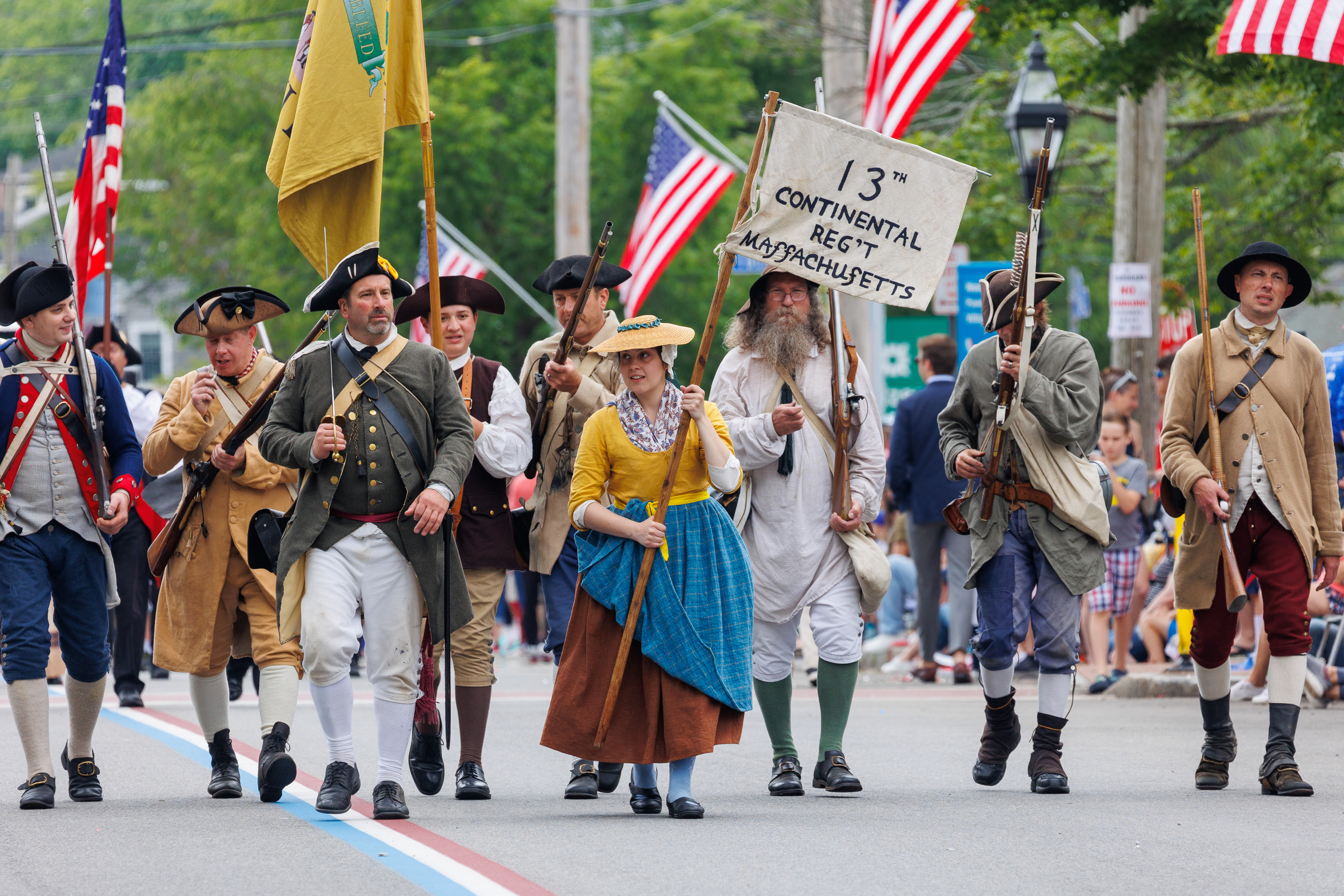
- Regiment re-enactors at the 2023 Gaspee Days Parade in Rhode Island
- Active: 1775–1777
- Allegiance: Continental Congress of the United States, Commonwealth of Massachusetts
- Branch: Infantry
- Size: Regiment
- Part of: Massachusetts Line
- Engagements: American Revolutionary War: Siege of Boston; New York campaign; Battle of Trenton

Commanders
- Notable commanders: Joseph Read

The 13th Continental Regiment, also known as Read's Regiment, was raised April 23, 1775, as a Massachusetts militia regiment at Cambridge, Massachusetts, under Joseph Read. The regiment would join the Continental Army in June 1775. The regiment saw action during the Siege of Boston, the New York Campaign and the Battle of Trenton. The regiment was disbanded on January 1, 1777, at Morristown, New Jersey.

Col Timothy Walker Minutemen Regiment-1775

3rd Regiment, Provincial Army April-July 1775

22nd Regiment, Army of the United Colonies July - Dec 1775

13th Regiment, Continental Army -Jan 19, 1776

source -https://www.amazon.com/General-Wards-Colonial-Keith-Brough/dp/1517446260
