= Lee's Additional Continental Regiment =

- Active: 1777–1779
- Allegiance: Continental Congress of the United States
- Type: Infantry
- Part of: Massachusetts Line
- Engagements: Monmouth and Rhode Island

Lee's Additional Continental Regiment was raised on January 12, 1777, with troops from Massachusetts at Cambridge, Massachusetts for service with the Continental Army. The regiment was commanded by Colonel William R. Lee, and saw action at the Battle of Monmouth and the Battle of Rhode Island. The Regiment was merged into the 16th Massachusetts Regiment on April 9, 1779. Its lineage is perpetuated by the 101st Engineer Battalion.
