= Henley's Additional Continental Regiment =

- Active: 1777–1779
- Allegiance: Continental Congress of the United States
- Type: Infantry
- Part of: Massachusetts Line
- Engagements: Monmouth and Rhode Island

Henley's Additional Continental Regiment was raised on January 12, 1777, with troops from Massachusetts and New Hampshire at Boston, Massachusetts for service with the Continental Army. The regiment saw action at the Battle of Monmouth and the Battle of Rhode Island. The Regiment was merged into the 16th Massachusetts Regiment on April 9, 1779.
