= 21st Continental Regiment =

Ward's Regiment 21st Continental Regiment
- Active: 1775–1777
- Allegiance: Continental Congress of the United States
- Type: Infantry
- Part of: Massachusetts Line
- Engagements: Siege of Boston; Battle of Trenton

Commanders
- Notable commanders: Colonel Jonathan Ward

The 21st Continental Regiment, also known as Ward's Regiment, was raised April 23, 1775, as a Massachusetts militia regiment at Cambridge, Massachusetts, under Colonel Jonathan Ward. The regiment would join the Continental Army in June 1775. The regiment saw action during the Siege of Boston, the New York Campaign and the Battle of Trenton. The regiment was disbanded on January 1, 1777, at Morristown, New Jersey.
