= 13th Massachusetts Regiment =

Jonathan Brewer's Regiment 6th Continental Regiment 13th Massachusetts Regiment
- Active: 1775-1781
- Allegiance: Continental Congress of the United States
- Type: Infantry
- Part of: Massachusetts Line
- Engagements: Battle of Bunker Hill, Battle of Valcour Island, Saratoga, Monmouth, Battle of Rhode Island.

Commanders
- Notable commanders: Colonel Brewer; Colonel Edward Wigglesworth; Lt Col. Ebenezer Sproat

The 13th Massachusetts Regiment, also known as the 6th Continental Regiment and Jonathan Brewer's Regiment, was first raised in 1775 by Colonel Jonathan Brewer. Under Colonel Edward Wigglesworth in 1776 it was designated the 6th Continental. It was manned with troops raised primarily from Essex, York, and Cumberland Counties. An additional battalion was later raised from Middlesex, Suffolk, Plymouth and Barnstable Counties. The regiment would see action at the Battle of Bunker Hill, Battle of Valcour Island, Battle of Saratoga, Battle of Monmouth and the Battle of Rhode Island. The regiment was disbanded on January 1, 1781, at West Point, New York. The Light Infantry Company fought at the Battle of Stony Point
