= Salem Poor =

African-American Revolutionary War soldier (1747–1802)

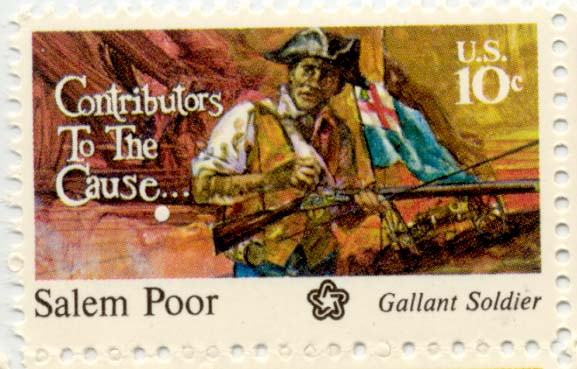
- 1975 postage stamp depicting Poor at the Battle of Bunker Hill
- Born: c. 1747; Andover, Massachusetts
- Died: 1802 (aged 55); Boston, Massachusetts
- Military career
- Allegiance: United States
- Branch: Massachusetts Militia
- Service years: 1775-1780
- Conflicts: American Revolutionary War; Battle of Bunker Hill; Valley Forge; Battle of White Plains; Battle of Saratoga; Battle of Monmouth

Salem Poor (c. 1747–1802) was an enslaved African-American man who purchased his freedom in 1769 and became a soldier in 1775. He was involved in the American Revolutionary War, particularly in the Battle of Bunker Hill.

== Early life ==
Salem Poor was born in 1747 into slavery on a farm in Andover in the Province of Massachusetts Bay. The farm was owned by John Poor and Rebecca Poor and his son John Poor Jr. His first name may be derived from the Arabic word "salaam", meaning peace. Other sources explain that his name may have been derived from his place of birth. He bought his freedom on July 10, 1769, from John Poor Jr. for £27 (equivalent to about $5,600 in 2019 dollars), a year's salary for an average working man at the time.

== Military career ==
In May 1775, Poor enlisted in the militia when he was about 28 years old. He served under Captain Benjamin Ames in Colonel James Frye's regiment. Colonel Frye's command consisted of Lieutenant-Colonel James Bricket, Major Thomas Poor, Adjutant Daniel Hardy, and Surgeon Thomas Kittredge. His regiment, with two others, totaled 850 soldiers. They marched from Cambridge to Charlestown, Massachusetts, where the officers decided to fortify Breed's Hill. At Breed's Hill, the regiments built a fort on the top of the hill using pick axes and shovels. The men worked quickly and quietly to ensure the British army occupying Boston did not know they were there.

Salem Poor was one of three dozen African Americans who fought on Bunker Hill. As many as 5,000 soldiers, both free and enslaved African Americans fought for the Patriots. Meanwhile, about twenty to thirty thousand black soldiers fought for Britain. The British had an army twice the size of the Americans. They would assault Breed's Hill on June 17, 1775. The Americans would push the British back in two assaults but would run out of ammunition and retreat during the third assault.

Poor is remembered for his actions during the Battle of Bunker Hill on June 17, 1775, where he was credited with mortally wounding British Lieutenant Colonel James Abercrombie, as the latter jumped onto the redoubt and yelled, "Surrender, you rebels." While Abercrombie suffered multiple wounds in the battle, he managed to compose reports in the two days following the incident. Fellow officers who visited and spoke with him noted that the fatal shot that ultimately killed him came from friendly fire behind his position. John Pitcairn's army had previously fired on the patriots at Lexington and Concord. John Trumbull would create his famous series of paintings, The Death of General Warren at the Battle of Bunker's Hill, June 17, 1775, depicting the death of American rebel General Joseph Warren and British Lieutenant Colonel James Abercrombie.

Poor's valor and gallantry at the Battle of Bunker Hill prompted 14 officers, including Colonel William Prescott and Colonel Jonathan Brewer, to cite him for heroism and petition the General Court of Massachusetts with the following statement:

The Reward due to so great and Distinguished a Character. The Subscribers beg leave to Report to your Honorable. House (Which We do in justice to the Character of so Brave a man) that under Our Own observation, we declare that A Negro Man Called Salem Poor of Col. Frye's Regiment, Capt. Ames. Company in the late Battle of Charleston, behaved like an Experienced Officer, as Well as an Excellent Soldier. to Set forth Particulars of his Conduct would be Tedious, We Would Only beg leave to say in the Person of this Negro Centers a Brave & gallant Soldier.

There is no evidence that Poor received a reward.

On July 10, 1775, George Washington ended the recruitment of African Americans. On November 12, he issued orders prohibiting all black men from serving in the Continental Army. Despite the ban on recruitment, those who had already been serving for some time were allowed to stay until this point. On hearing of this, Lord Dunmore, who at the time was Governor of Virginia, offered freedom to all enslaved people willing to serve with the British. Washington, sensing the disaster that would almost surely result, immediately changed his position, at once ordering all recruiters to enlist any black men who wanted to fight.

Poor is known to have retreated to the winter camp at Valley Forge and fought in the Battle of White Plains, Battle of Saratoga and Battle of Monmouth. He also served at Fort George. Salem Poor served in New York in 1776 under General Benedict Arnold. He would eventually re-enlist for three years and spend his time in Saratoga. In 1777–1778, he was at Valley Forge and fought in the Battle of White Plains. Poor immediately re-enlisted in the militia and fought with the Patriot forces until March 20, 1780, when he was discharged in Providence, Rhode Island.

== Personal life ==
In August 1771, Poor married Nancy Parker, a woman of partial Native American descent, according to papers in the Charlotte Helen Abbot Collection of the Andover Historical Society. Lois Kerschen, in the Encyclopedia of African American History, lists her as a "free African American". They had a son, Jonas, who was baptized on September 29, 1776. In 1780, he married his second wife, Mary Twing, a free African American. The couple moved to Providence but were ordered to leave that city, presumably because they could not support themselves. In 1785, he placed an advertisement in the Boston Gazette to disown Mary's debts and "forewarn all Persons from trusting MARY, the Wife of the Subscriber".

Poor then married Sarah Stevens, a woman of European descent, in 1787, and in 1793 he spent several weeks in the Boston Almshouse. He was briefly jailed for "breach of peace" in 1799, married for the fourth and final time in 1801, and died in 1802. Details of his life after the Revolutionary War were not widely known until research by genealogist David Lambert, a descendant of Poor's former enslavers; an article about this research appeared in The Boston Globe in 2007.

== Honors ==
The petition sent by Col. Prescott and the other 13 officers suggested the Continental Congress offer Poor "The Reward due to so great and Distinguish a Character." This memorial was dated at Cambridge on December 5, 1775. While the battle is thought to have been fought on Bunker Hill, it was fought on Breed's Hill. A monument commemorates the battle on Breed's Hill when General Warren fell on June 17, 1775. Daniel Webster gave two speeches at the 1843 ceremony, later known as the Bunker Hill Orations, commemorating soldiers like Salem Poor who fought in the battle. The monument's cornerstone was laid by Lafayette in 1825.

In 1876, in a speech at the time of the United States' centennial celebration, George Washington Williams commemorated Poor and other African-American soldiers who fought at Bunker Hill. For the 1976 United States Bicentennial, Poor was honored in 1975 with a stamp in the "Contributors to the Cause" series. Poor Street in Andover was named after him.
