= 12th Massachusetts Regiment =

Phinney's Regiment 18th Continental Regiment 12th Massachusetts Regiment
- Active: 1775-1781
- Allegiance: Continental Congress of the United States
- Type: Infantry
- Size: Regiment
- Part of: Massachusetts Line
- Engagements: American Revolutionary War: Battle of Bunker Hill; Saratoga; Monmouth

The 12th Massachusetts Regiment, also known as 18th Continental Regiment and Phinney's Regiment, was raised on April 23, 1775, under Colonel Edmund Phinney outside of Boston, Massachusetts. The regiment saw action at the Battle of Bunker Hill, Battle of Valcour Island, Battle of Saratoga and the Battle of Monmouth. The regiment was disbanded on January 1, 1781, at West Point, New York.
