= James Frye =

Ironworker and army officer (1710–1776)

Colonel James Frye III was born on January 24, 1710 in Bradford, Massachusetts to James Frye II and Joanna Sprague. Frye settled in Andover, Massachusetts. His family home at 169 Chestnut Street, built around 1730, still stands to this day. He was an ironworker who was active in military service in the French and Indian War and the American Revolution.

== Trade and personal life ==
Frye was an ironworker by trade and operated an ironworks shop in Andover. He is the cousin of Revolutionary War General Joseph Frye.

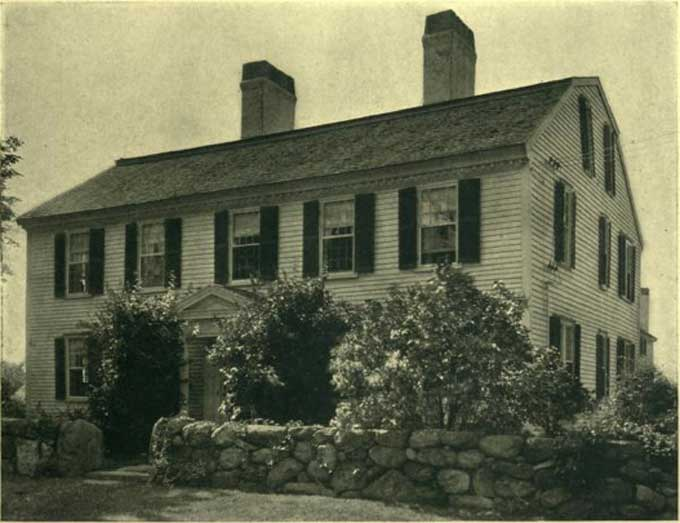
Frye house at 169 Chestnut Street in North Andover, MA

Frye married twice. His first marriage was to Elizabeth Osgood on November 28, 1734 in Andover, Massachusetts. Together they had two children. Elizabeth Osgood died on December 8, 1756. Frye married a second time, to Sarah Robey on May 27, 1757 in Lynn, Massachusetts. Together they had several children, most notably Lieutenant Jonathan Frye (1742-1793) and Ensign Frederick Frye (1760-1828) who both served as Officers in the Revolutionary War.

== Military service ==
=== French and Indian Wars ===
Frye was a veteran of the French and Indian Wars, serving as a Lieutenant with George Washington at the capture of Louisburg in 1745. The Louisburg Square neighborhood in Boston is named after this campaign. Frye was promoted to Captain with the 4th Essex County Militia Regiment in 1754 and later served on the Crown Point Expedition as a Lieutenant Colonel.

=== American Revolution ===
On April 19, 1775, Frye served as the Colonel of the Essex County Militia, known as “Frye’s Regiment” and marched this regiment to Lexington. Colonel Frye's Regiment was absorbed into the 10th Massachusetts Regiment (Cambridge Brigade) with Frye as the senior Colonel of the Brigade. Frye was in command of this Regiment when it became part of the Army of Observation in May 1775 and marched this Regiment to Bunker Hill in June 1775.

==== Battle of Bunker Hill and wounding ====
During the battle of Bunker Hill, the Colonial troops were running dangerously low on gun powder and musket balls. As a result, the Colonial lines began to falter during the third wave of the British attack. Recognizing the gravity of the situation, Colonel Frye took action to prevent a retreat. He mounted his horse, exposed himself to enemy fire, drew his sword and exclaimed: "I was with you at the Battle of Louisburg! We Americans can win the fight again!" Colonel Frye then charged forward on horseback, rallying his men while shouting "Remember Louisburg, men! Remember Louisburg!"

Minutes later, a British musket ball tore through Colonel Frye's thigh. Colonel Frye got off the horse and taunted the British for their aim, yelling "The regulars fire damned careless!" Although wounded, he continued to rally his men during the fight.

This Regiment would later provide cover for the units that constructed the redoubt on Breed's Hill during their retreat. It was during this retreat that Salem Poor, a member of Colonel Frye's Regiment and also from Andover, gained fame for unspecified heroics. As a result of Poor's actions that day at Bunker Hill, Regimental commanders petitioned the General Court of Massachusetts Bay Colony to formally recognize him.

In the latter months of 1775, Colonel Frye continued to lead his men during the Siege of Boston. The remnants of Colonel Frye's Regiment were later disbanded on December 31, 1775 by order of the Continental Congress in order to establish the Continental Army.

== Death and legacy ==
A week later, Colonel Frye died on January 8, 1776 as a result of wounds suffered at the battle of Bunker Hill and the resulting infection. He is buried at Old North Parish Burying Ground, in North Andover, Essex County, Massachusetts. His grave headstone reads: "IN MEMORY OF COLONEL JAMES FRYE, WHO DEPARTED THIS LIFE JAN THE 8TH 1776... WHILE IN THE CONTINENTAL SERVICE SUPPORTING THE INDEPENDENCE OF THE UNITED STATES OF AMERICA"

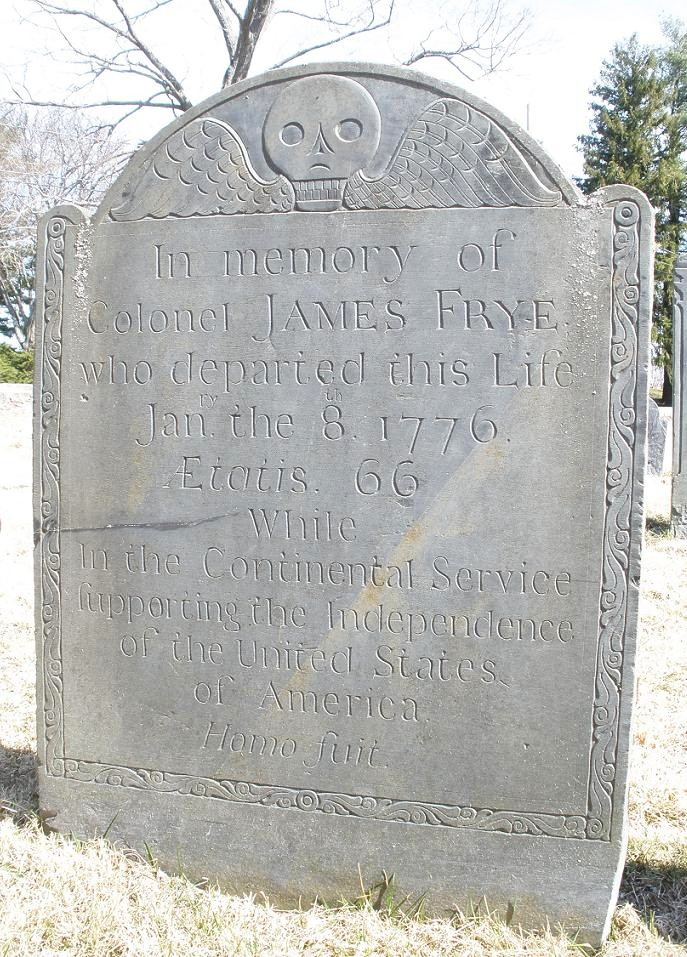
Colonel James Frye Headstone

At the Bunker Hill Monument there are several memorial plaques dedicated to the men who died that day. One of those plaques honors the men of "Frye's Regiment" who were killed in action. The Plaque reads: "THESE TABLETS, IN GRATEFUL RECOGNITION OF THE PATRIOTIC SOLDIERS OF THE NEW ENGLAND ARMY WHO FELL JUNE 17, 1775, WERE ERECTED BY ORDER OF THE CITY COUNCIL OF BOSTON, JUNE 17, 1889."

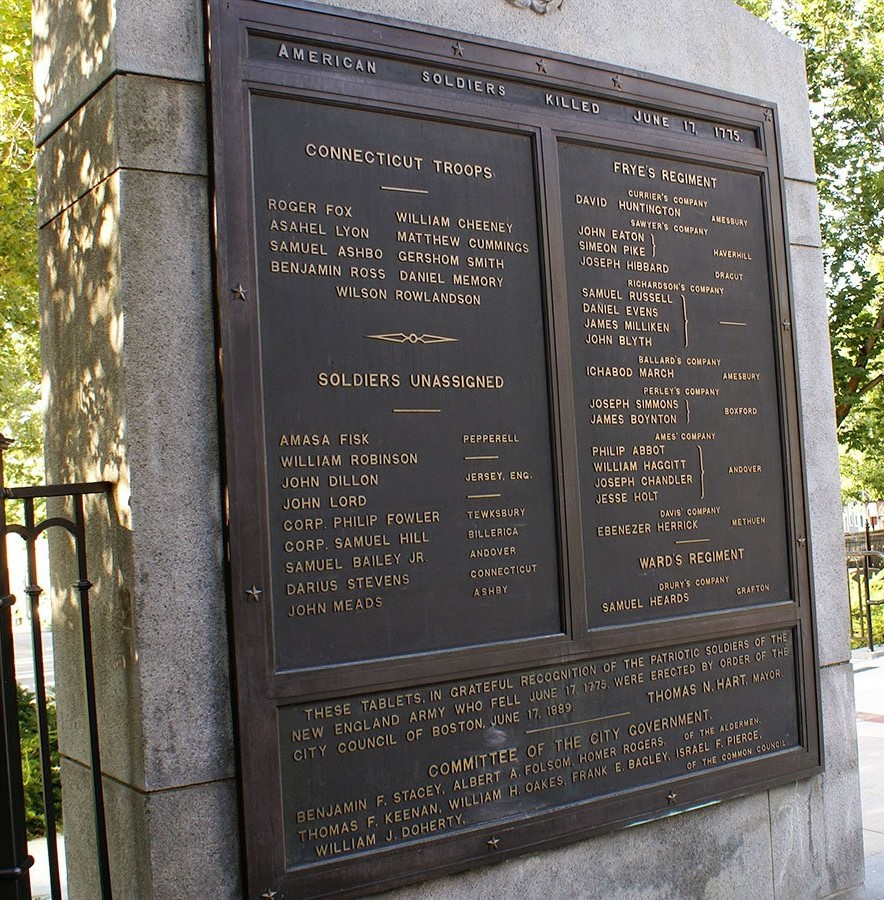
Frye's Regiment Plaque at Bunker Hill

Colonel Frye is represented as a propositus in The Society of the Cincinnati. The Society of the Cincinnati is the nation’s oldest patriotic organization, founded in 1783 by officers of the Continental Army who served together in the American Revolution. Its mission is to promote knowledge and appreciation of the achievement of American independence and to foster fellowship among its members. Now a nonprofit educational organization devoted to the principles and ideals of its founders, the modern Society maintains its headquarters, library, and museum at Anderson House in Washington, D.C.
