= 5th Massachusetts Regiment =

Mansfield's Regiment 27 Continental Regiment 5th Massachusetts Regiment
- Active: 1775–1783
- Country: United States
- Allegiance: Massachusetts
- Branch: Continental Army
- Type: Regiment
- Role: Infantry
- Part of: Massachusetts Line
- Engagements: Concord; Bunker Hill; New York Campaign; Trenton; Princeton; Saratoga

Commanders
- Notable commanders: Colonel Rufus Putnam; Colonel Israel Hutchinson

The 5th Massachusetts Regiment also known as the 19th Continental Regiment was raised on April 17, 1775, under Colonel Mansfield outside of Boston, Massachusetts. The regiment saw action at the Battle of Concord, the Battle of Bunker Hill, the New York Campaign, the Battle of Trenton, and the Battle of Princeton. Colonel Rufus Putnam took command in January 1777 and participated in the Battle of Saratoga. The regiment was commanded by Colonel John Mansfield, of Lynn, who left the service on September 15, 1775 - after a court martial for failing to take the unit across the neck to support units on the Charlestown peninsula during the Battle of Bunker Hill. From then until the end of the year the regiment was commanded by Lieutenant Colonel Israel Hutchinson, of Danvers. It served in the siege of Boston, and afterwards was designated the 27th Continental Regiment in the 1776 establishment.

Under the command of Colonel Jonathan Holman, the regiment was sent to Rhode Island and then to New York, arriving on July 27, 1776. They fought at the Battle of Long Island on August 27, and then White Plains. Afterward, the regiment was sent to Vermont to help defend against the approach of British army under Gen. John Burgoyne.

The regiment was furloughed on June 12, 1783, at New Windsor, New York, and disbanded on November 3, 1783.

== Notable members ==
- Rufus Putnam
- Daniel Shays
