= 1st Massachusetts Regiment =

Paterson's Regiment 15th Continental Regiment 1st Massachusetts Regiment
- Active: 1775–1783
- Allegiance: Continental Congress of the United States
- Type: Infantry
- Part of: Massachusetts Line
- Engagements: Bunker Hill

Commanders
- Notable commanders: Colonel John Paterson Lieutenant Colonel Seth Read

The 1st Massachusetts Regiment was an infantry unit of the Continental Army that fought during the American Revolutionary War. It was first authorized on 23 April 1775 in the Massachusetts State Troops as Paterson's Regiment under Colonel John Paterson and was organized at Cambridge, Massachusetts. It consisted of eleven companies of volunteers from Berkshire, Hampshire, Suffolk, Middlesex, Worcester, and York counties in Massachusetts and the county of Litchfield in the colony of Connecticut. The regiment was adopted into the main Continental Army on 14 June 1775 and was assigned to William Heath's brigade on 22 July 1775. On 1 January 1776 the regiment (less two companies) was consolidated with Sayer's and Sullivan's companies of Scammon's Regiment; re-organized to eight companies and redesignated as the 15th Continental Regiment of Heath's Brigade.

The regiment would see action at the Battle of Bunker Hill. When the army was reorganized at the end of 1775 the regiment was designated the 15th Continental Regiment, and in 1777 it was designated the 1st Massachusetts Regiment (but was also referred to as Vose's Regiment after its colonel, Joseph Vose).

== 1776 reorganization ==
The remnants of Paterson's Regiment (less Morse's and Watkin's companies) and Sayer's and Sullivan's companies of Scammon's Regiment were combined on 1 January 1776 to form eight companies designated as the 15th Continental Regiment, which was assigned to the brigade of William Heath. On 24 January 1776 the regiment was reassigned to an unnamed brigade in the main Continental Army. On 16 February 1776 this brigade was designated as Frye's Brigade and on 15 April 1776 the brigade was reassigned to the Canadian Department. The regiment was then reassigned to Reed's Brigade of the Northern Department on 20 July 1776. On 11 August 1776 this brigade was redesignated as Paterson's Brigade. On 26 November 1776 the regiment was reassigned to St. Clair's Brigade of the main Continental Army.

== 1777 reorganization ==
On 1 January 1777 the 15th Continental Regiment was joined by two companies of the 18th Continental Regiment and two companies of the 6th Continental Regiment and re-organized as eight companies, known as Vose's, or the 1st Massachusetts Regiment. The regiment was reassigned to the Northern Department on 9 February 1777. On 13 March 1777 the regiment was assigned to the Highlands Department (which guarded the area around West Point, New York, and assigned to McDougall's Brigade on 12 June 1777 and three days later 15 June 1777 was assigned to 2nd Connecticut Brigade of the Highlands Department. On 10 July 1777 the regiment was reassigned to the 2nd Massachusetts Brigade. This brigade was reassigned to the Northern department on 24 July 1777. On 7 November 1777 the brigade was reassigned to the main Continental Army. On 22 July 1778 the regiment was reassigned to the Eastern Department and re-organized to nine companies on 1 April 1779 and on 7 July 1779 the brigade was reassigned to the Highland's Department and was redesignated as the 1st Massachusetts Regiment on 1 August 1779.

== 1779–1783 ==
On 1 August 1779 the regiment was in the 2nd Massachusetts Brigade in the Highland Department. On 1 January 1781 the regiment was reassigned to the 1st Massachusetts Brigade in the Highland Department and was disbanded on 3 November 1783 at West Point, New York. Its lineage is carried on by the U.S. 104th Infantry Regiment.
