= 1st American Regiment (1783–1784) =

Continental Army unit of the American Revolutionary War era

- Active: 1783–1784
- Allegiance: United States
- Type: Infantry, Artillery
- Size: 775
- Part of: Continental Army
- Nickname(s): Jackson's Continental Regiment

Commanders
- Notable commanders: Henry Jackson

1st American Regiment, also known as Jackson's Continental Regiment of 1783–1784, was the last unit in the Continental Army, retained after the close of the American Revolutionary War. This regiment, under the command of Colonel Henry Jackson of Massachusetts, was not the same unit as Jackson's Additional Continental Regiment of 1777, which had become the 16th Massachusetts Regiment in 1780 and had been disbanded in 1781. Equally, this regiment should not be confused with the First American Regiment of 1784–1791, which was originally commanded by Colonel Josiah Harmar, has remained in service to the present, and is now the 3d United States Infantry Regiment (The Old Guard).

However, when Jackson's Regiment was disbanded in 1784, one company remained in service and was assigned to Harmar's Regiment. The remaining company, under Captain John Doughty, had been raised by Alexander Hamilton in 1776 and had ended the war as the 2d Company, 2nd Continental Artillery Regiment. Through various reorganizations, the company has continued in the United States Army to the present day.

== Peacetime regular army ==
The ratification of the Treaty of Paris, September 3, 1783, presented the Continental Congress with the question of providing the newly independent United States with a peacetime Regular Army. Congress considered several plans for a permanent peace establishment, but failed to adopt any of them.

A compromise was found when the Congress finally settled on the expedient of provisionally organizing a single regiment to remain in service. Command of the new regiment was given to Colonel Henry Jackson.

== Organization ==
Jackson's Regiment was authorized as an element of the Continental Army on October 23, 1783. Under this arrangement the regiment and the Continental Army were virtually the same thing. It was organized at West Point, New York, on November 3, 1783. The field units which had composed the Continental Army were disbanded in November 1783, and Jackson's Regiment was the force which succeeded them.

His regiment was to consist of a regimental headquarters and nine companies. Most, but not all, of the men under his command were veterans of the Massachusetts Line. In addition to the Massachusetts veterans, Captain John Doughty's Company of the 2nd Continental Artillery Regiment was attached to the regiment, as were the remaining officers and men of the Corps of Invalids. The 2nd Continental Artillery had been placed on the New York quota in 1781 and the Corps of Invalids had been raised at large.

=== Doughty's Artillery Company ===
Doughty's Company was originally authorized on January 6, 1776, by the New York Provincial Congress as the New York Provincial Artillery Company. The company was organized at New York City in the spring of 1776. Its first commander was Captain Alexander Hamilton. On March 17, 1777, the company, then commanded by Captain John Doughty, was assigned to Lamb's Continental Artillery Regiment. In August 1779 it was numbered the 2nd Company in the 2nd Continental Artillery Regiment.

=== Corps of Invalids ===
On June 20, 1777, the Continental Congress resolved to raise a Corps of Invalids. The Invalids, a body of physically disabled Continental Army veterans, were organized as a regiment of eight companies under the command of Colonel Lewis Nicola. They were intended to serve as guards at magazines, hospitals, and similar establishments. It was also hoped that the corps could serve as a military school, but this seems not to have happened.

=== Strength of the 1st American Regiment, January 3, 1784 ===
On January 3, 1784, the Commanding General of the Army, Major General Henry Knox, submitted to Congress a list of Continental Army officers remaining in service, and a return showing the organization of Jackson's Regiment. The regiment consisted of 775 officers and men:

- Infantry
  - 1 colonel; 1 lieutenant colonel; 1 major; 9 captains; 9 lieutenants; 9 ensigns; 1 adjutant; 1 quartermaster; 1 paymaster; 1 surgeon; 1 surgeon's mate; 1 sergeant major; 1 quartermaster sergeant; 1 drum major; 45 sergeants; 16 drummers and fifers; and 500 "rank and file" (corporals and privates)
- Artillery
  - 1 major; 1 captain; 2 captain lieutenants; 7 lieutenants; 1 adjutant; 10 sergeants; 12 corporals; 2 bombardiers; 2 gunners; and 100 matrosses
- Invalids
  - 4 captains; 4 lieutenants; 2 sergeants; 1 drummer; and 27 rank and file

== Service history ==
The First American Regiment served in garrison at West Point, New York, until its disbandment. When the British Army evacuated New York City as a result of negotiations between George Washington and Sir Guy Carleton, Colonel Jackson had immediate command of the 800-man column that marched into New York City on November 25, 1783, under General Washington, to formally take possession of the city for the United States.

== Disbandment of the Regiment ==
On June 2, 1784, Congress resolved:

That the commanding officer be directed to discharge the several officers and soldiers now in the service of the United States, except 25 privates to guard the stores at Fort Pitt, and 55 to guard the stores at West Point and other magazines, with a proportionate number of officers; no officer to remain in service above the rank of a captain; those privates to be retained who are enlisted on the best terms; provided Congress, before its recess, shall not take other measures respecting the disposition of those troops.

— Journals of Congress

== Alexander Hamilton Battery ==
Captain Doughty received the brevet rank of major on September 30, 1783. He was the major of artillery appearing in the return submitted by General Knox.

The Congressional resolve of June 2, 1784, caused Major Doughty's Artillery Company to continue in service, as his company was the unit retained. To his company belongs the distinction of being the only element of the Continental Army to continue in service after the war as an element of the United States Army.

On the following day, June 3, 1784, the Continental Congress resolved to raise a new regiment, the First American Regiment of 1784-1791 (which exists today as the 3rd Infantry, a.k.a. "The Old Guard"), consisting of eight infantry companies and two artillery companies. Captain Doughty furnished the senior company. The 2d Artillery Company, First American Regiment, was raised in Pennsylvania and commanded by Captain Thomas Douglass, who had been an officer in Thomas Proctor's 4th Continental Artillery Regiment from April 1, 1777 to January 1, 1783 and served as a captain in the First American Regiment from August 1784 to October 1785.

The organization of the United States Army changed frequently in the late eighteenth and early nineteenth century; but on June 1, 1821, the company that had been commanded by Major Doughty in 1784 was designated Company "F," 4th United States Regiment of Artillery. The company retained this designation until 1901. The company received a different designation in that year and, in a further reorganization on May 31, 1907, it became Battery "D," 5th United States Field Artillery Regiment. The battery served in France in World War I as an element of the 1st Division, American Expeditionary Forces.

On October 1, 1940, the battery became Battery "D," 5th Field Artillery Battalion. It served in North Africa and Europe in World War II. After a further period of reorganization, the unit was redesignated the 1st Rocket Howitzer Battalion, 5th Artillery, on April 20, 1960, and as the 1st Battalion, 5th Artillery (Alexander Hamilton Battery), on January 20, 1964.

== Senior officers ==
The following is a list of officers of Jackson's Regiment, with the rank of captain or higher, which served from November 1783 to June 1784.

- Colonel Henry Jackson
- Lieutenant Colonel William Hull
- Major Caleb Gibbs
- Captain Job Sumner
- Captain Joseph Williams
- Captain Isaac Frye
- Captain Elnathan Haskell
- Captain Thomas Hunt
- Captain John Mills
- Captain John Hobby
- Captain Joseph Potter
- Captain Simon Jackson
- Captain John Doughty
