= John Doughty =

United States Army general

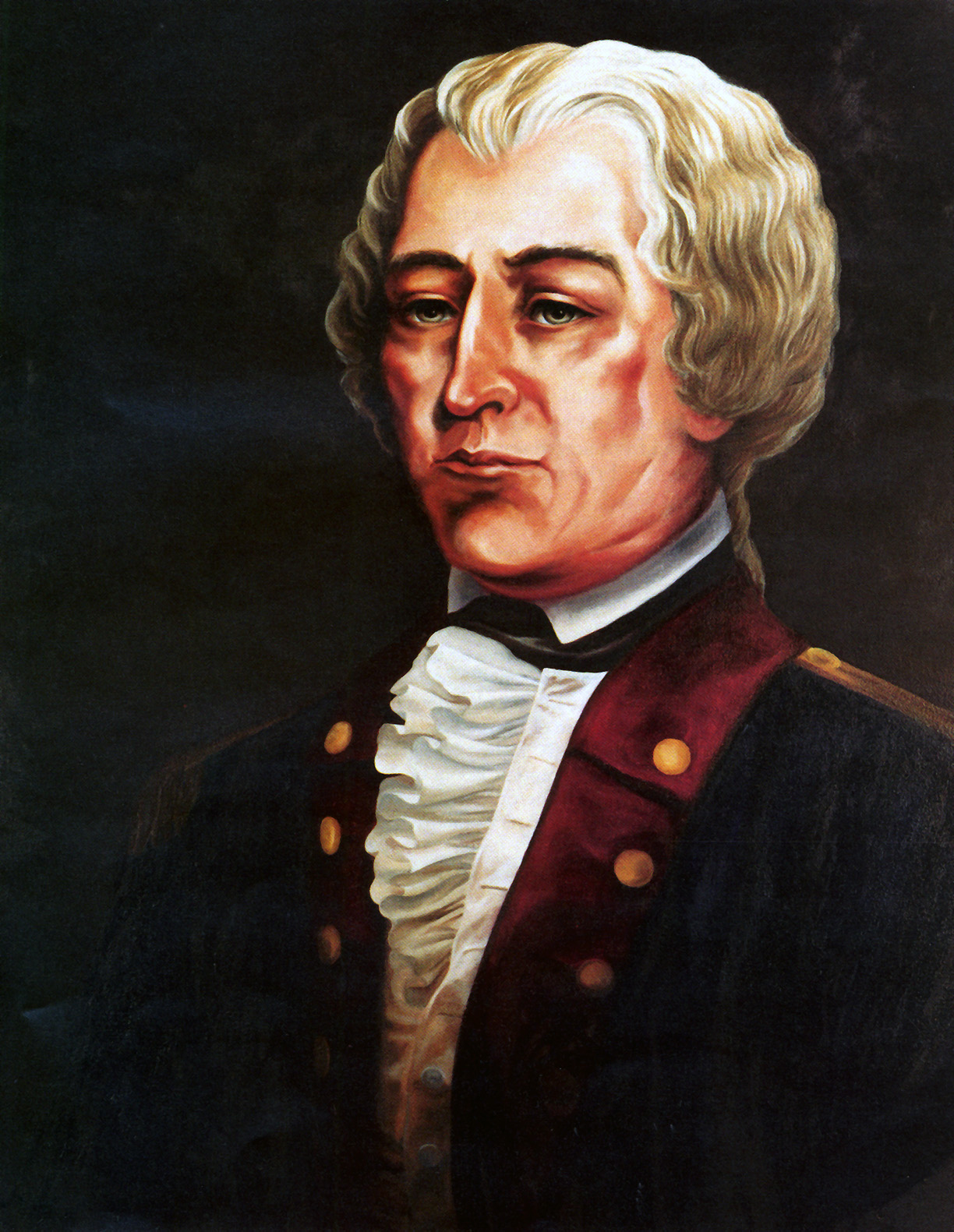

2nd Senior Officer of the United States Army
- In office 20 June 1784 – 12 August 1784
- Preceded by: Henry Knox
- Succeeded by: Josiah Harmar

Personal details
- Born: July 25, 1754 New York City, New York, British America
- Died: September 16, 1826 (aged 72) Morristown, New Jersey, U.S.

Military service
- Allegiance: United States
- Branch/service: Continental Army; United States Army
- Years of service: 1776-1791, 1798-1800
- Rank: Lieutenant Colonel
- Battles/wars: American Revolutionary War; Battle of Brandywine; Battle of Germantown; Battle of Monmouth; Battle of Springfield; Siege of Yorktown; Northwest Indian War; Quasi-War

John Doughty (July 25, 1754 – September 16, 1826) was an American military officer who briefly served as the senior officer of the United States Army in 1784. Holding the rank of major at the time, he bears the distinction of being the lowest ranked individual ever to serve as the senior most United States Army officer.

== Biography ==
Born in New York City on July 25, 1754, he graduated from King's College (Columbia University) in 1770 and entered military service through New Jersey state channels in January 1776.

=== American Revolution ===
He served as adjutant general of two Morris County battalions and was appointed captain lieutenant of the New Jersey Eastern Artillery Company in March 1776. Doughty became a captain of the 2nd Continental Artillery Regiment in January 1777 and served as an aide-de-camp to Major General Philip Schuyler. Later, he was assigned to command the New York State Artillery Company in March 1777.

Doughty would participate in the battles of Brandywine (1777), Germantown (1777), Monmouth (1778), Springfield (1780), and Yorktown (1781). He was appointed brigade major of the Corps of Artillery in 1779 and was appointed fort major for the West Point garrison in 1782. He was transferred to the Corps of Artillery in June 1783 and was promoted to brevet major in September. Doughty's artillery company was attached to Henry Jackson's 1st American Regiment following in the disbanding of the Continental Army late in 1783.

=== Post Revolution ===
Doughty became the Army's senior ranking officer following the discharge of Jackson's regiment in June 1784, leaving Doughty in command of a company of 55 artillerymen at West Point and a detachment of 25 men at Fort Pitt in Pennsylvania guarding military stores left over from the Continental Army.

On August 12 of the same year, an Infantry regiment was organized under Brevet Brigadier General Josiah Harmar, who then became the senior officer in the United States Army. On that date, Doughty was promoted to major and placed in command of a battalion of two companies of artillery. In this position he superintended the construction of Fort Harmar (1785) and Fort Washington (1789) on the Ohio frontier.

Doughty was designated major commandant of the Battalion of Artillery in September 1789, and then was dispatched by President Washington to the frontier to negotiate with the Choctaw Nation for trading post sites in 1789. He was repelled with serious losses when attacked by Cherokee, Shawnee, and Muscogee people, while leading a detachment up the Tennessee River on a negotiating mission to the Chickasaw Nation in 1790.

In March 1791 Doughty was offered the position of lieutenant colonel commandant (i.e. commanding officer) of the newly formed 2nd Infantry Regiment. Doughty declined the appointment and decided to retire from the Army instead.

Doughty was appointed brigadier general of artillery, 2d Division, New Jersey militia in 1793 and was appointed lieutenant colonel, 2d Regiment of Artillerists and Engineers, as war with France threatened in June 1798.

In May 1800 Doughty resigned from the Army and returned to private life on his estate at Morristown, New Jersey, to engage in agriculture and pursue literary studies. He died there on September 16, 1826. He is buried in the First Presbyterian Church Cemetery in Morristown.

Military offices
Preceded by Henry Knox	1st Senior Officer of the United States Army; 1784	Succeeded by Josiah Harmar
