= Gerrish's Regiment =

- Active: 1775–1776
- Allegiance: Continental Congress of the United States
- Type: Infantry
- Part of: Massachusetts Line
- Engagements: Siege of Boston

Commanders
- Notable commanders: Colonel Samuel Gerrish

Gerrish's Regiment was one of the 27 infantry regiments of the Massachusetts line created by the Continental Congress in 1775. Commanded by Colonel Samuel Gerrish, the unit saw action in the Boston and Cambridge campaigns and fought at Bunker Hill June 17, 1775.

== Formation ==
The unit was one of many established on June 14, 1775, when the Continental Congress assumed responsibility for militia regiments that had been raised by the colonies of New Hampshire, Massachusetts, Rhode Island, and Connecticut. Most of these units, including Gerrish's Regiment, were stationed outside Boston, Massachusetts, where they besieged the city occupied by British troops under the command of General Thomas Gage.

== Reorganization ==
As 1775 came to a close, with no end in sight to the siege of Boston and troops in Quebec preparing to attack Quebec City, Congress authorized a second establishment of the army, with a new regimental structure. Gerrish's Regiment then became the 26th Continental Regiment.
