= Seth Read =

American politician (1746–1797)

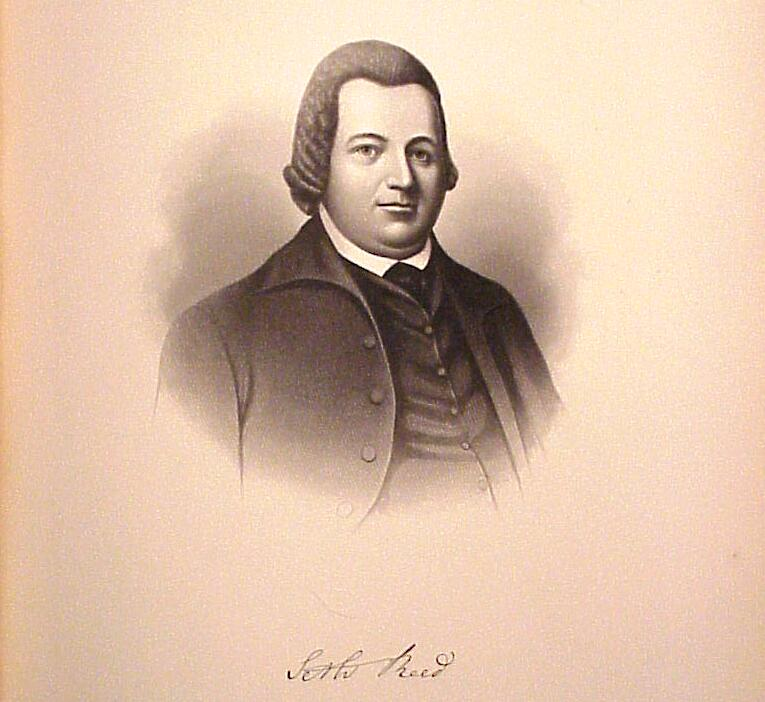
- Born: March 6, 1746; Uxbridge, Massachusetts
- Died: March 19, 1797 (aged 51); Erie, Pennsylvania
- Military career
- Allegiance: United States
- Branch: Massachusetts Militia; Continental Army
- Service years: 1775-1776
- Rank: Lieutenant Colonel
- Units: Massachusetts 26th and Massachusetts 15th Regiments
- Conflicts: Battle of Bunker Hill; Invasion of Canada (1775); Battle of Lexington
- Other work: Physician; Constitutional Convention; Massachusetts state legislator; Pioneer of Erie, Pennsylvania, and of Geneva, New York; Instrumental in E Pluribus Unum on U.S. coins

Seth Read (March 6, 1746 – March 19, 1797) was born in Uxbridge in Worcester County, Massachusetts, and died at Erie, Pennsylvania, as "Seth Reed", at age 51.

== Biography ==
=== Early life ===
He was the son of Lieutenant John Read, and Lucy Read. John Read had received his military title through active service in the French and Indian War. Seth Read's brothers and sisters were: Sarah, born October 24, 1729, (married Josiah Adarns December 27, 1750); Joseph, March 6, 1732; Peter, November 13, 1735; John, June 1743; Seth, March 6, 1746; Josiah, July 23, 1753. Lieutenant John Read died at Uxbridge, January 18, 1771.

Seth Reed grew up in the colonial, agricultural and recently incorporated frontier town of Uxbridge. He would become a landowner, a militia member and a farmer. One reference mentioned that he worked as a physician.

Read married Hannah Harwood, (b. 1747), in 1768. Their son, Charles John Read, was born on December 23, 1771. Seth and Hannah's son Rufus was born in 1775. Seth and Hannah had seven children, James Manning, Charles John, Sophia, Rufus Seth, Sally Adams, Henry Joseph, George Washington and Mary (Polly) Reed. Seth Read also was the town clerk at Uxbridge from 1777 to 1778. Seth and his brother Joseph attended every meeting in the area having to do with preparing for the revolution. They are mentioned in the minutes of the town meeting as early as 1774 for Revolutionary War preparation and were active in the committee of correspondence.

=== Revolutionary war service ===
Lieutenant Colonel Seth Read was commissioned in the Revolutionary War, served in the Battle of Lexington and Concord "Alarm", and commanded a regiment of troops at the Battle of Bunker Hill, the Massachusetts 26th regiment, under Col. John Patterson on June 17, 1775. He participated in the Invasion of Canada (1775) Campaign in the Massachusetts 15th Regiment up until August 1776 but left active service in January 1777 that year for health reasons, after the 15th had succumbed to smallpox and hunger. General George Washington stopped at a tavern owned by Colonel Seth Read in June 1775, while on his way to assume command of the Continental Army at Boston. Two years later, Seth Reed is referred to as having received a written vote by the Town of Uxbridge for particular duties related to public safety in the town. "the town chose "by written votes," Seth Read, "to procure and Lay before the court the Evidence that may be had of the Inimical dispositions of any Inhabitant of this town towards this or any of the United States who shall be charged by the freeholders and other Inhabitants of said town, or if their residence within this State is looked upon to be dangerous to the public peace and Safety." In other words, Colonel Read was commissioned to deal with traitors, sedition or suspected treason within the town. Ironically, at least one source claims that Benedict Arnold's widow, Peggy Shippen, died here 59 years later. In the following year the Town of Uxbridge votes to send its troops and resources to the Continental Army. Worcester, Massachusetts Town Records indicate that Colonel Read was elected to the Massachusetts Senate in 1780. Read also served as a member of the Constitutional Convention in 1779.

=== Postwar service ===
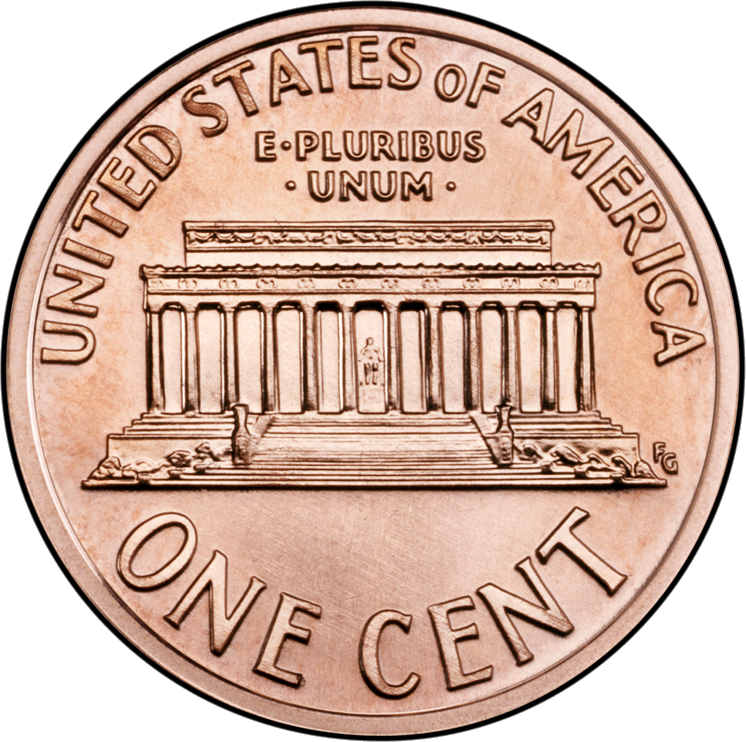
Read helped place the motto "E pluribus unum" on U.S. coins.

After the war we find references to Seth Read in the early records of Worcester County and the Town of Uxbridge. He remained active in the local political life. Colonel Seth Read served in the Massachusetts General Court, or State Legislature from 1784 to 1786. In March 1786, Seth Reed petitioned the Massachusetts General Court, both the House and the Senate, for a franchise to mint coins, both copper and silver, and "it was concurred" (Massachusetts Coppers). According to the U.S. Treasury Colonel Reed of Uxbridge, Massachusetts was said to be instrumental in having E Pluribus Unum placed on United States coins. The phrase is placed on all U.S. coins. The phrase "E Pluribus unum", "Out of Many, One", is now considered the traditional motto of the United States. The United States Treasury was first organized in 1789. The first official U.S. money with printing which included E Pluribus Unum was in 1795, and possibly as early as 1791. The first use of e pluribus unum on any U.S. coins was trace"d to copper coins minted at Newburg New York in 1786. The text which cites these earlier printings, again attributes use of e pluribus unum on US coins to Colonel Read of Uxbridge, Mass. Modern US coins have the phrase on the reverse side of the coin, (see the infobox of the one cent coin below where the inscription "E Pluribus Unum" appears above the Lincoln Memorial). The inaugural journey of President George Washington through New England in 1789 mentions the President's intent to visit his friend Colonel Read on passing through Uxbridge. But Colonel Reed was out of town reportedly moving his family to upstate Geneva, New York. Colonel Reed was reported to be a great landowner in Uxbridge. Another indicator of Seth Read's prominence in early Uxbridge was this citation. Referring to the Capron house in Uxbridge, "This house was built by Col. Seth Read, who once owned most of the real estate in this village" The biography of Seth Read and his descendants describes that Colonel Seth Read and his brother, Colonel Joseph Read owned half of the land in the town of Uxbridge, and in the town of Northbridge. Their two houses were within a mile and a half of each other on either side of the town common in Uxbridge. But during the war their financial fortunes took a severe reversal and these two entrepreneurial adventurous men returned to Uxbridge to a relative state of poverty.

=== Pioneer moves: Geneva, New York ===
Seth Read moved, his wife Hannah and their family to Geneva, Ontario County, New York, in the winter of 1790. At the conclusion of the war he moved from Massachusetts into Ontario County, where by trade with the Indians he became owner of a tract of land eighteen miles in extent. This occurred in 1787, while Hannah stayed in Uxbridge with the family. Finally, he sold this property and brought his wife and two sons (James Manning and Charles John) to the present site of Erie, arriving on the 17th of June, 1795. The settlement at Geneva was not permanent yet, and there were attacks by the Indians.

=== First settler of Erie, Pennsylvania ===
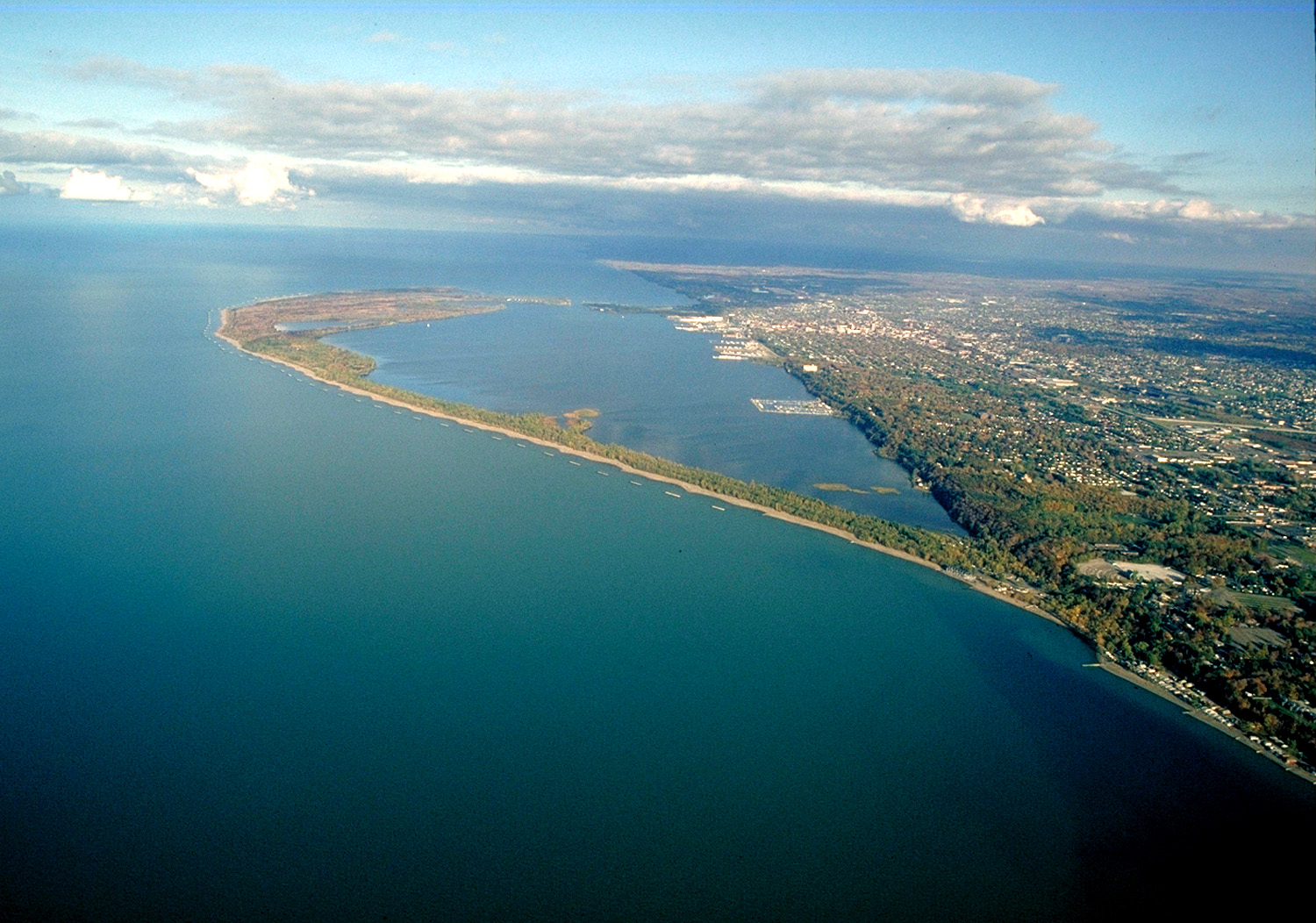
Aerial view of Presque Isle State Park, Erie, PA, where Colonel Reed settled with his family in 1795.

Colonel Reed, Hannah and their family, were then, the first European pioneers and family to have settled Erie, Pennsylvania, in 1795. The family came from Buffalo to Erie in a sail boat, reaching the harbor in the evening and camping on the peninsula over night, for fear of the Indians. Soon after his arrival in June 1795, Colonel Reed erected a log cabin at the mouth of Mill Creek, which was the first permanent building in Erie. Known as the Presque Isle Hotel, it was used by its builder both as family residence and public house. In the following fall the Colonel's others sons, Rufus S. and George W., came to Erie by way of Pittsburgh, and in the succeeding year the family homestead became the well known farm on Walnut Creek, where the pioneer father died at the age of 51 on March 19, 1797, less than two years after his arrival at Mill Creek. Seth Read, in 51 years, left his legacy, as a patriot soldier, a legislator, a pioneer, and as one who was instrumental in the phrase E Pluribus Unum, ("From Many, One") being added to all U.S. coins. This phrase is considered "the traditional motto" of the United States. "In God We Trust" was then added in 1956.

== Legacy and afterwards ==
His wife (born Hannah Harwood) died in Erie on December 8, 1821, at the age of 74, being the mother of the following children, four sons of whom have already been mentioned: James Manning, Charles John, Sophia, Rufus Seth, Sally Adams, Henry Joseph, George Washington and Mary (Polly). One of his sons celebrated the first marriage recorded in the local annals, and his grandson by this marriage was the first child of European descent born in Erie. Seth and Hannah's grandson, Charles M. Reed became a Whig Congressman, from Pennsylvania, and wealthy great lakes steamship captain from Erie. Colonel Reed, was the great-grandfather of William Ward Reed, who has a prominent place in PA biographies. There were later Congressmen who were descended from Colonel Reed from PA. In Uxbridge, the family name was spelled Read, and in Pennsylvania, as Reed. The Read or Reed family was the most prominent family in northwest Pennsylvania for many decades. The descendants of this same family were extensively scattered across the United States.

== History of the Read estate at Uxbridge ==
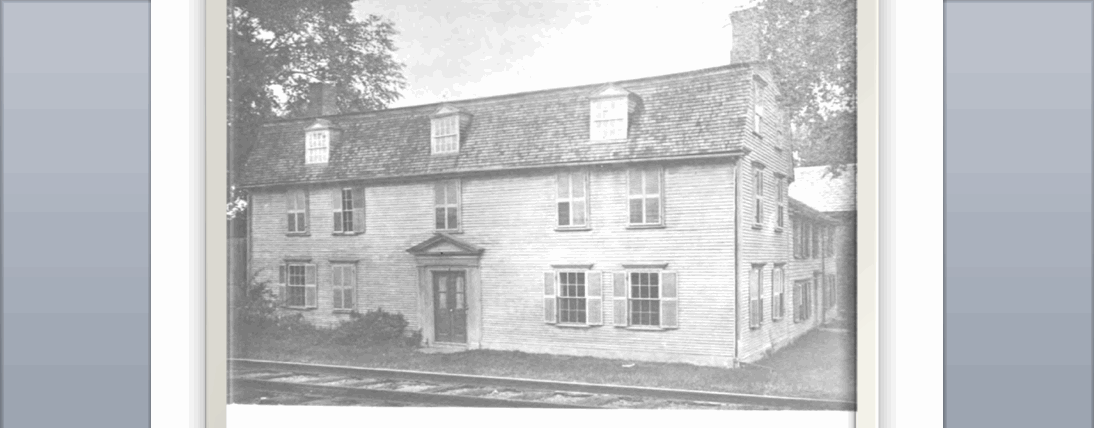
Seth Read House Uxbridge, MA, built circa 1767 at corner of present-day Mendon St, and North Main Street before railroad was built

Read water works building on Mumford River. Today it houses a liquor store

The former "Colonel Seth Read estate and water works", built in 1767 and 1777, both at Uxbridge, were purchased in 1790, by John Capron, originally of Cumberland, Rhode Island, and later from Grovsvenordale, CT. John Capron pioneered Capron Mills which had the first power looms for woolens, developed at the Mumford River falls, in downtown Uxbridge, where the estate is located. Capron Mills and its successors manufactured U.S. Military uniforms from before the Civil War Period to 1962 including the first U.S. Air force blues. Colonel John Capron's first wife was a descendant of the Read family in Uxbridge. Colonel Read's original home at Uxbridge, known later as a Capron house and later owned by Chase's, was razed in 1967 to make a parking lot for a local drug store. The local drug store, is now a liquor store, and is actually built in the same 1777 grist mill built by Seth Read. The grist mill and water works later served as Bay State Arms, a manufacturer of single shot rifles, in the 1880s. A photograph of this house can be found in the book entitled, "Uxbridge, Images of America", by B. Mae Edwards Wrona, published in 2000 and in Mary Buford's book about his life.
