= 7th Continental Regiment =

Prescott's Regiment 7th Continental Regiment
- Active: 1775-1777
- Allegiance: Continental Congress of the United States
- Type: Infantry
- Part of: Continental Army
- Engagements: Siege of Boston, New York

Commanders
- Notable commanders: Colonel William Prescott

The 7th Continental Regiment, also known as Prescott's Regiment, was raised April 23, 1775, as a Massachusetts militia regiment at Cambridge, Massachusetts, under Colonel William Prescott. The regiment joined the Continental Army in June 1775. The regiment saw action during the Siege of Boston and the New York Campaign. On January 1, 1777, the regiment was disbanded and volunteers from the regiment joined the 2nd Massachusetts Regiment.
