= 1st Canadian Regiment =

Quebec volunteers infantry unit, 1775–1781

- Active: September 1775–1 January 1781
- Allegiance: United States of America
- Type: Infantry
- Part of: Continental Army
- Motto: Pro aris et focis
- Engagements: American Revolutionary War; Battle of Quebec; Battle of Trois-Rivières; Battle of Saratoga; Siege of Fort Stanwix; Battle of Rhode Island

Commanders
- Notable commanders: James Livingston

The 1st Canadian Regiment (1775–1781) was an Extra Continental regiment of the American Patriots' Continental Army, consisting primarily of volunteers from the Province of Quebec. The 1st was raised by James Livingston to support Patriot efforts in the American Revolutionary War during the invasion of Quebec. Livingston, who was born in New York and living in Quebec, recruited men from Chambly, Quebec as early as September 1775, but a formal regimental designation was made by Richard Montgomery on November 20, 1775, with recognition by the Second Continental Congress following on January 8, 1776. The regiment, which never approached its authorized size of 1,000 men, saw action primarily in the Canadian theater and New York, and was disbanded on January 1, 1781, at King's Ferry, New York.

== Formation ==
In September 1775, militia forces from New York and other colonies under the command of Philip Schuyler and Richard Montgomery crossed into Quebec with the aim of driving British military forces from Montreal and Quebec City. Guy Carleton, the British governor and military commander, had fortified Fort Saint-Jean as the primary defense of Montreal. The colonial forces, preparing to besiege the fort, sought local support. James Livingston, a grain merchant living near Chambly, about 10 miles (16 km) from Saint-Jean, raised a local militia, which in October assisted in the siege and capture of Fort Chambly, and the capture of supplies intended for the besieged moving on the Richelieu River.

Following the fall of Montreal, Livingston was authorized by Montgomery on November 20 to raise a regiment to assist in the coming assault on Quebec City. In eight days he raised approximately 200 men. The regiment received formal recognition from the Second Continental Congress on January 8, 1776.

The regiment at first consisted of a mix of Canadiens, Acadiens, and Quebec anglophones.

Two of Livingston's brothers served in the regiment. Richard Livingston was a lieutenant colonel, and Abraham served as a captain.

== Service ==
=== Quebec ===
When Montgomery's army arrived outside Quebec, the 1st Canadian consisted of two to three hundred Canadiens. On December 31, 1775, the regiment was charged with making a diversion at Quebec City's Saint Jean gate, to draw British attention away from the primary attacks, which were led by Benedict Arnold and Richard Montgomery, and were directed at the city's Lower Town. The diversions did not work, and the battle ended disastrously for the Americans, with Montgomery killed, Arnold wounded, and about 400 men taken prisoner.

The remnants of the army, then under Arnold's command, besieged the city until May 1776, when British reinforcements began arriving, forcing the Americans into a panicked retreat. The retreat ended at Sorel on May 20, where they were met by reinforcements, and eventually put under the command of General John Sullivan.

=== Trois-Rivières ===
On the night of June 7, 1776, Livingston's regiment was part of a force of about 2,000 under Brigadier General William Thompson that returned from Sorel to Trois-Rivières to drive off what they believed to be 300 to 600 British troops from Quebec. When they arrived near Trois-Rivières, they instead found the vanguard of the British counteroffensive, numbering several thousand. After a brief skirmish, the Americans forces were broken, and made a disorganized retreat back to Sorel.

Following this battle, the regiment retreated with the rest of the army to Fort Ticonderoga. While the regiment had never been particularly large (Livingston never had more than a few hundred men under arms at any one time), the retreat from Quebec left the regiment much reduced in size, since anyone leaving the province was unlikely to be able to return.

=== New York ===
Following the army's return to Ticonderoga, the regiment was assigned garrison duty in upstate New York, primarily the Mohawk and Schoharie valleys, so that it could be reorganized. During this time, Livingston was known to be recruiting in New York City. Following Burgoyne's invasion from Quebec in 1777, the regiment was moved to the upper Hudson River valley. In August 1777, the regiment was assigned to Benedict Arnold on his expedition in relief of the Siege of Fort Stanwix. It then saw service in both Battles of Saratoga as part of Ebenezer Learned's brigade.

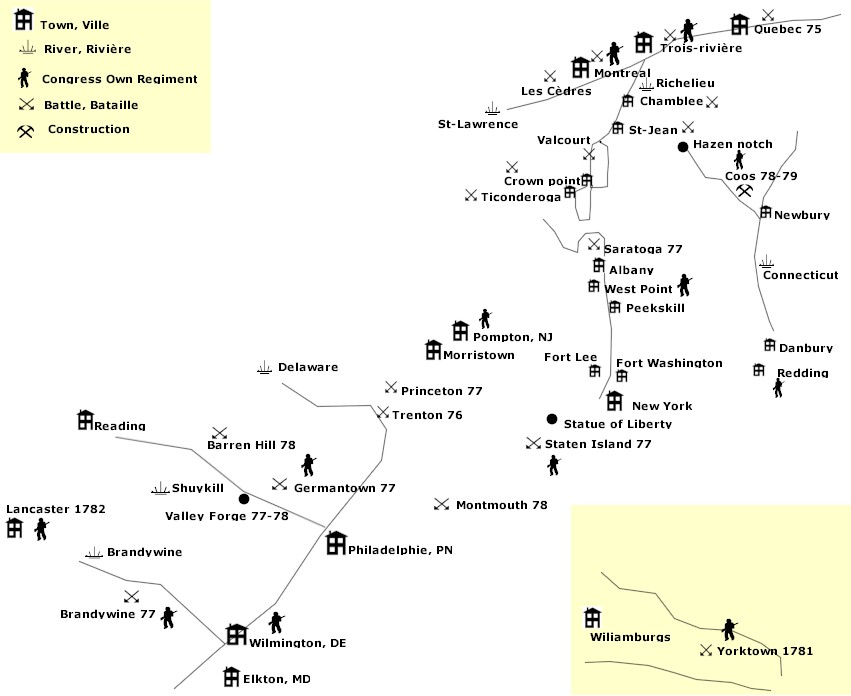
This map shows movements and battle sites of Canadian regiments in the Revolutionary War

=== Rhode Island ===
The regiment saw action in the Battle of Rhode Island in 1778.

=== Garrison duty ===
For the remainder of the war, the regiment had garrison duty in New York. Most notably, Colonel Livingston was in command of Verplanck's Point on the Hudson River in September 1780, and played a crucial role in the unmasking of Benedict Arnold's treachery. While on guard duty, his troops fired on the British sloop of war Vulture, forcing that vessel to retreat southwards. This ship had brought Major John André to meet with General Arnold, who was then in command at West Point. Since the ship was driven off, André was forced to attempt travel by land to New York, when he was captured not far from the British lines near Tarrytown with incriminating papers in his possession. André was hanged as a spy, and Arnold, his plot discovered, managed to escape to the British lines.

== Disbandment ==
The regiment was disbanded as part of a major reorganization on January 1, 1781, at King's Ferry, New York. Members that remained in service were assigned to the 2nd Canadian Regiment.

== See also ==
- Moses Hazen
