= Henry Jackson (Continental Army general) =

American colonial leader

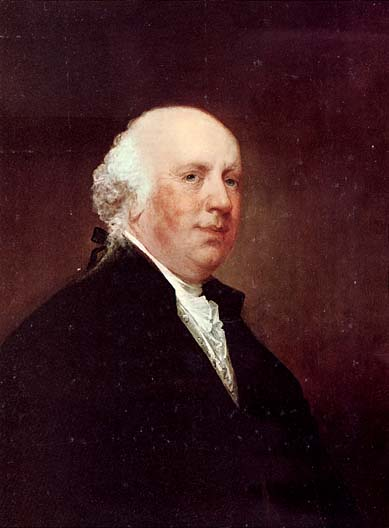
Portrait by Gilbert Stuart, c. 1805

Henry Jackson (bapt. October 19, 1747 – January 4, 1809) was a Continental Army officer from Boston, Province of Massachusetts Bay, during the American Revolutionary War. For most of the war, he was colonel of Jackson's Additional Continental Regiment, which was redesignated the 16th Massachusetts in 1780. He commanded the last regiment of the Continental Army, the 1st American, which was disbanded in 1784. Jackson was a lifelong friend of Henry Knox, another Continental Army officer, whose business affairs he was also heavily involved in.

== Life ==
Jackson was the youngest son of Joseph and Susannah (Gray) Jackson. Before the American Revolutionary War, he was an officer of the First Corps of Cadets in Boston, which was disbanded during the British occupation. After the evacuation, six former cadet officers organized a company of seventy-eight officers and men called the Boston Independent Company on 17 March 1776, with Jackson as their commander (Their uniform was black turned up with red). In January 1777, the unit was taken into Continental service, designated Jackson's Additional Continental Regiment. He led his regiment in the Philadelphia campaign of 1777, at Monmouth and Rhode Island in 1778, and at Springfield, New Jersey in 1780. In 1780 the regiment was taken into the Massachusetts Line and renamed the 16th Massachusetts Regiment.

Jackson's regiment was disbanded in 1781 and Jackson was transferred to command the 4th Massachusetts Regiment. He received a brevet promotion to brigadier general on September 30, 1783 and led Continental forces into New York City on the heels of the British evacuation in November. The 4th Massachusetts was disbanded on November 3, 1783, at West Point, New York.

Jackson was retained as commander the 1st American Regiment, which was the only infantry unit still active after the dissolution of the Continental Army in November. Jackson was discharged from the Army on June 20, 1784, when the 1st Regiment was disbanded, and the standing army was reduced to only 80 soldiers.

When it was established in 1783, Jackson was admitted as an original member of The Society of the Cincinnati in the state of Massachusetts.

He later served as a major general in the Massachusetts militia from 1792 until 1796 and was the agent supervising the building of the frigate USS Constitution at Boston in 1797.

He was a lifelong close friend of Major General Henry Knox and acted as his agent in his business affairs (particularly those concerning Knox's vast land holdings in Maine) while the general was Secretary of War. Other close associates included Hepzibah Swan of Boston, in whose household Jackson lived for some years.

Unmarried, he died in Boston on January 4, 1809.

Henry Jackson is the namesake of the town of Jackson, Maine.
