= 4th Massachusetts Regiment =

Learned's Regiment 3rd Continental Regiment 4th Massachusetts Regiment
- Active: 1775-1783
- Allegiance: Continental Congress of the United States
- Type: Infantry
- Part of: Massachusetts Line
- Engagements: Battle of Bunker Hill; Siege of Boston; New York and New Jersey campaign Battle of Trenton; Battle of Princeton; Battles of Saratoga; Battle of Monmouth; Battle of Rhode Island

Commanders
- Notable commanders: Col. Ebenezer Learned, Col. William Shepard, Col. Henry Jackson, Lt. Col. William Stacy

The 4th Massachusetts Regiment also known as 3rd Continental Regiment or Learned's Regiment, was raised on April 23, 1775, by Colonel Ebenezer Learned outside Boston, Massachusetts.

The regiment saw action at the Battle of Bunker Hill, New York Campaign, Battle of Trenton, Battle of Princeton, Battle of Saratoga, Battle of Monmouth and the Battle of Rhode Island. The regiment was disbanded on November 3, 1783, at West Point, New York.

== Notable members ==
- Deborah Sampson
- David Van Horne
