= Extra Continental regiments and Additional Continental regiments =

Military unit during the American Revolutionary War

The Extra Continental regiments and Additional Continental regiments of the American Revolutionary War (1775–1783) differ from each other and from all other Continental Army infantry regiments by the manner in which they formed. The six Extra Continental regiments, which were authorized by Congress and organized in late 1775 to mid-1776, are distinct by having formed without any administrative connection to an individual state.

The 16 Additional Continental regiments were approved by Congress as a separate group on December 27, 1776, specifically in response to a request from Gen. George Washington for additional troops, and Congress expressly delegated their formation directly to Washington. All Additional Continental regiments were organized in the spring and summer of 1777. In contrast to both the Extra and Additional regiments, all other infantry regiments of the army were organized and supported under the direct authority of individual state governments (the "line regiments").

== Extra Continental regiments ==
The six Extra Continental regiments, which are commonly confused with the Additional regiments, are:

- Maryland and Virginia Rifle Regiment
- Warner's Regiment (Green Mountain Boys)
- 1st Canadian Regiment
- 2nd Canadian Regiment
- German Battalion
- DuBois' Regiment (later, the 3rd New York Regiment)

== Additional Continental regiments ==
The 16 Additional Continental regiments formed later and under distinctly different circumstances than those of the Extra Continental regiments. The 1-year enlistments in most Continental Army regiments that formed in the earliest part of the American Revolutionary War expired on December 31, 1776. Therefore, Congress and Washington began preparations for reorganizing the army during that early fall. The reorganization was to apply to troops from every state, and a major factor in the new plan was the decision to recruit for the duration of the war rather than for a single year. Eighty-eight regiments were authorized by a Congressional resolve of September 16, 1776, in which Congress formally outlined the 13 state lines of the Continental Army by specifying the quota of regiments for each state.

Congress' estimates of the population of each state governed its allocation of regiments, ranging from 15 regiments each from Massachusetts and Virginia to single regiments from Delaware and Georgia. In correspondence to Congress during December 1776, however, Washington pressed for even more men. Central to Washington's position was a recommendation to increase the infantry regiments from the 88 called for in September to a minimum of 110. Congress acted on Washington's request on December 27, 1776, and ruled "That General Washington shall be, and he is hereby, vested with full, ample, and complete powers to raise…from…all of these United States, 16 battalions of infantry, in addition to those already voted by Congress…"

In contrast to the previously approved 88 regiments, the 16 Additional regiments were organized directly by Washington's authority, rather than by the authority of the state governments, and were placed completely under Washington's control. The resolution gave Washington the requested 110 regiments, for in addition to the 16 new regiments and the 88 units of the September quotas there were the 6 Extra regiments that had been previously approved by Congress and that were also not explicitly tied to a single state.

The 16 Additional Continental regiments are:

- Cornell's Additional Continental Regiment (never formed)
- Forman's Additional Continental Regiment
- Gist's Additional Continental Regiment
- Grayson's Additional Continental Regiment
- Hartley's Additional Continental Regiment
- Henley's Additional Continental Regiment
- Jackson's Additional Continental Regiment
- Lee's Additional Continental Regiment
- Malcolm's Additional Continental Regiment
- Patton's Additional Continental Regiment
- Scammell's Additional Continental Regiment (never formed)
- Sheppard's Additional Continental Regiment
- Sherburne's Additional Continental Regiment
- Spencer's Additional Continental Regiment
- Thruston's Additional Continental Regiment
- Webb's Additional Continental Regiment

Although Washington wrote to Col. Ezekiel Cornell of Rhode Island and Col. Alexander Scammell of New Hampshire on January 12, 1777, and offered each command of one of the 16 Additional Continental regiments, both declined, and the units never formed.
