= 3rd Massachusetts Regiment =

Heath's Regiment Greaton's Regiment 24th Continental Regiment 3rd Massachusetts Regiment
- Active: 1775-1783
- Allegiance: Continental Congress of the United States
- Type: Infantry
- Part of: Massachusetts Line
- Engagements: Bunker Hill, Saratoga

Commanders
- Notable commanders: Colonel William Heath

The 3rd Massachusetts Regiment also known as the 24th Continental Regiment, Heath's Regiment, and Greaton's Regiment, was raised on April 23, 1775, under Colonel William Heath outside Boston, Massachusetts. When Heath was promoted to brigadier general in June 1775 the regiment came under the command of Colonel John Greaton. The regiment would see action at the Battle of Bunker Hill, Battle of Trois-Rivières, Battle of Valcour Island and the Battle of Saratoga. The regiment was disbanded, on November 3, 1783, at West Point, New York. Lineage carried on by the U.S. 104th Infantry Regiment.
