= Joseph Read =

Continental Army officer

- Born: March 6, 1732; Uxbridge, Massachusetts
- Died: September 22, 1801 (aged 69); Brookfield, Massachusetts
- Military career
- Allegiance: United States of America
- Branch: Massachusetts militia, Continental Army
- Service years: 1775–1776
- Rank: Colonel
- Unit: Massachusetts Line
- Conflicts: Lexington and Concord

Joseph Read (March 6, 1732 – September 22, 1801) was a soldier and a colonel in the American Revolutionary War.

== Early life ==
Read was born in Uxbridge, Massachusetts, the son of John and Lucy Read. He married Eunice Taft of Uxbridge on Nov 22, 1753. His father John, served in the French and Indian Wars.

== Military service ==
He was a lieutenant colonel at the battles of Lexington and Concord in April 1775. Thereafter, until the end of 1776, he served as colonel in command of several regiments of the Massachusetts Line. In war counsels during the 1776 defense of New York City, Read urged the evacuation of the American fortifications, dissenting from generals such as Nathanael Greene who urged that the forts be defended.

== Read/Reed family ==
His brother was Lt. Colonel Seth Read, who commanded the Massachusetts 26th and 15th regiments and founded Erie, Pennsylvania. The Read brothers owned half of the land in the towns of Uxbridge and Northbridge, Massachusetts, in the mid 18th century. The family is known as "Reed" in Pennsylvania, and the Read name and spelling continued in Massachusetts. At some point after the revolution, Joseph Read moved to Brookfield, Massachusetts, where he died in 1801. He and his wife Eunice are buried in Brookfield. His brother Seth Reed, founded Erie, PA, and died there in 1797.
