= 16th Massachusetts Regiment =

Jackson's Additional Continental Regiment 16th Massachusetts Regiment
- Active: January 12, 1777–January 1, 1781
- Disbanded: January 1, 1781
- Allegiance: Continental Congress of the United States
- Branch: Infantry
- Part of: Massachusetts Line
- Nickname(s): Henry Jackson's Regiment
- Engagements: American Revolutionary War: Battle of Monmouth; Battle of Rhode Island

Commanders
- Notable commanders: Colonel Henry Jackson

The 16th Massachusetts Regiment, also known as Henry Jackson's Additional Continental Regiment, was a unit of the American Massachusetts Line, raised on January 12, 1777, under Colonel Henry Jackson at Boston, Massachusetts. The regiment would see action at the Battle of Monmouth and the Battle of Rhode Island. The regiment was disbanded on January 1, 1781, at New Windsor, New York.

== Origins ==
In the years before the American Revolutionary War broke out in April 1775, the Province of Massachusetts Bay had a volunteer militia corps known as the Governor's Company of Cadets. Based in Boston, the company was disbanded in 1774 after its commander, John Hancock, was dismissed by Governor Thomas Gage. A number of its members left the city when the Siege of Boston began, and reformed themselves as an independent company under the command of Lieutenant Colonel Henry Jackson after the British evacuated the city in March 1776.

The company petitioned the Continental Congress to be included in the Continental Army, and on January 12, 1777, Jackson was given a colonel's commission and authorization to raise an "Additional Continental regiment". Recruitment was conducted primarily in the Boston, but the regiment eventually had members from as far off as Connecticut. The unit's surgeon from 1779 onward was Dr. James Thacher, who kept an extensive journal of his war experience.

== Service history ==
The regiment left Boston in October 1777 to join General George Washington's Main Army outside Philadelphia. In 1778 it was with that army as it followed the British across New Jersey, and served with distinction in the June 28, 1778 Battle of Monmouth. The regiment was then sent to Providence, Rhode Island, where it played a major role in the August 29, 1778 Battle of Rhode Island. It remained in Rhode Island in 1779, but was despatched to Boston as part of a mobilization made in response to the British seizure of Castine, Maine. The regiment was not part of the disastrous Penobscot Expedition that Massachusetts mounted to drive the British out, but it had been boarded onto transports and was en route to the area when the expedition dissolved following the arrival of British reinforcements. It was disembarked at Kittery, where it assisted in bringing in the remnants of the expedition that arrived there overland.

Following the British withdrawal from Newport in October 1779, the regiment was sent to New Jersey, where it spent a difficult winter. It was involved in a failed attack on Staten Island in January that was aborted when surprise was lost. The regiment then fought in the June 23, 1780 Battle of Springfield.

On July 24, 1780, the regiment was adopted into the Massachusetts Line and renamed the 16th Massachusetts Regiment. It was disbanded as part of a major reorganization of the army on January 1, 1781. Colonel Jackson was given command of the 4th Massachusetts Regiment, and later commanded the 1st American Regiment, the last major Continental Army unit.
