= John Thomas (American general) =

American doctor and Continental Army general

Major General John Thomas
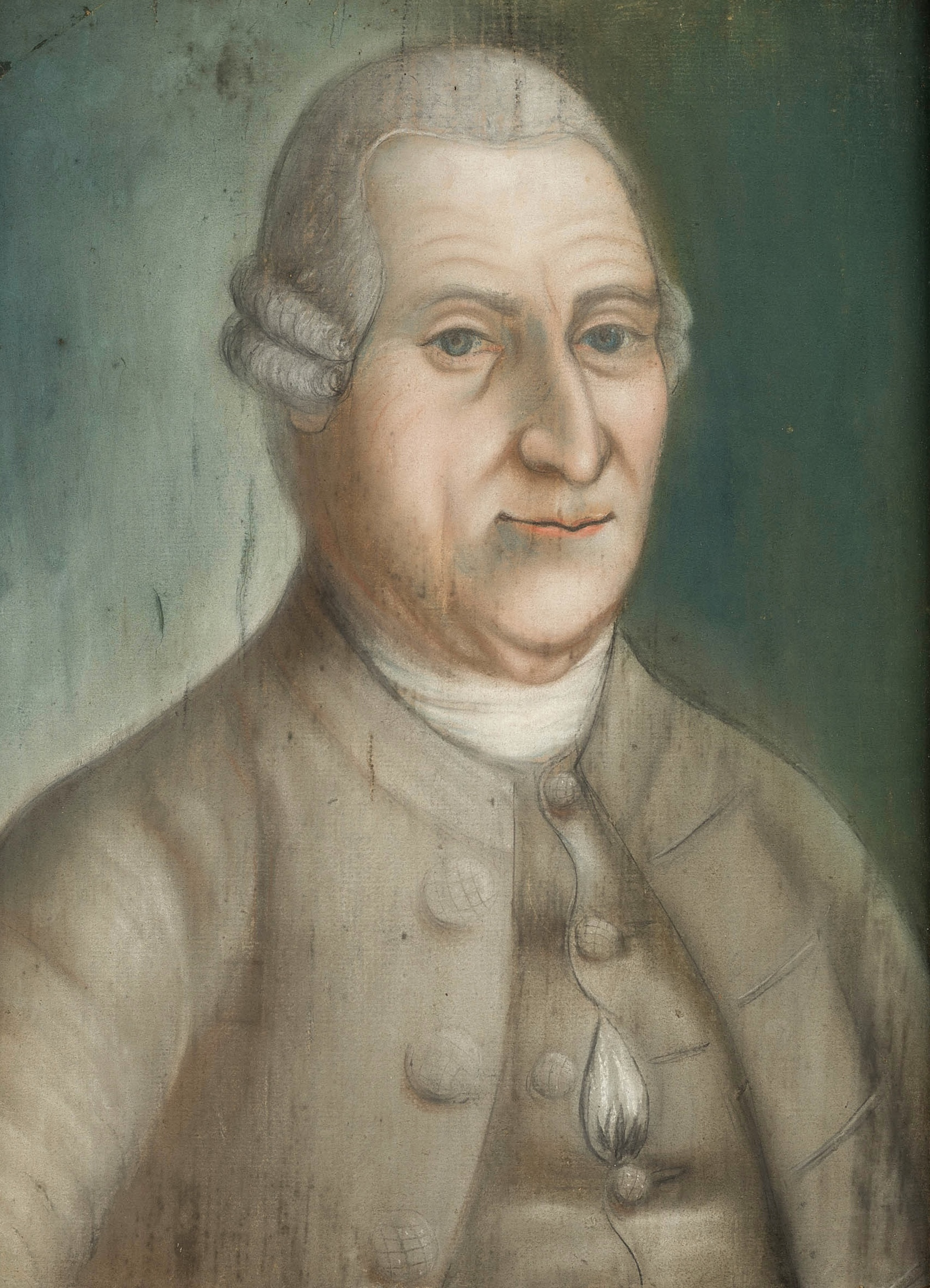
- Portrait, c. 1775
- Born: 1724; Marshfield, Massachusetts, British America
- Died: June 2, 1776 (aged 51–52) Richelieu River, near Chambly, Province of Quebec, British America
- Allegiance: United States
- Branch: Continental Army
- Rank: Major general
- Commands: 2nd Massachusetts Regiment
- Conflicts: King George's War; French and Indian War; Montreal campaign; American Revolutionary War; Boston campaign; Siege of Boston; Fortification of Dorchester Heights; Invasion of Quebec (DOW)
- Children: 3

John Thomas (1724 – 2 June 1776) was an American medical doctor and soldier from Massachusetts who became a major general in the Continental Army. He was a leader during the siege of Boston. Thomas briefly commanded the withdrawal from Canada after the unsuccessful invasion by the Continental Army. He died from smallpox during the retreat.

== Early life ==
Thomas was born in Marshfield, Province of Massachusetts Bay. As a young man he studied medicine with Doctor Tufts in Medford before beginning his own practice in Kingston. He was married to Hannah Thomas with whom he had two sons and a daughter.

== Colonial wars ==
During King George's War in 1746 he was appointed surgeon to a regiment bound for Annapolis Royal in Nova Scotia. Liking military service, in 1747 he traded his post as surgeon for that of a lieutenant. In 1755 he served as surgeon in General William Shirley's regiment.

By the time of the French and Indian War he had risen to colonel in the militia or provincial ranks. He served in Nova Scotia again in 1759. In 1760, General Jeffery Amherst put him at the head of a division during the attack and capture of Montreal. After the war he returned to his practice at Kingston. He was married to Hannah Thomas with whom he had a daughter and two sons.

== American War of Independence ==
In the period leading up to open war, Thomas recruited a regiment of volunteers (2nd Massachusetts Regiment) in Plymouth County and served as their colonel. In February 1775 the state assembly named him a brigadier general. He led his troops to the siege in Boston, and in June, the Congress appointed him a brigadier in the Continental Army.

Thomas briefly resigned, disappointed that while four major generals were named, he was not on the list. Congress was then trying to name no more than one major general from each state, and Artemas Ward was given preference. When George Washington and Charles Lee both implored him to remain, he returned to service. The Congress resolved that he would be given precedence over all other brigadiers in the army.

On the night of March 4, 1776, he led his division to fortify the Dorchester Heights, overlooking the south harbor at Boston, by using cannon that Henry Knox had brought from Fort Ticonderoga. From that position, he threatened the British fleet and the British were forced to withdraw, evacuating Boston on March 17. Thomas was finally named a major general.

After General Richard Montgomery was killed, Thomas was assigned to command in Canada and take charge of the Canadian invasion. He joined the army besieging Quebec on May 1, but found a disaster. The forces here numbered less than 1,000. Besides its walls, the city had more defenders than that. Over 300 of his men were already overdue for discharge from their enlistment, and smallpox was raging through the force.

He immediately sent the sick men to Trois-Rivières and began a withdrawal with the rest. Thomas died of smallpox on June 2, 1776, during the retreat up the Richelieu River near Chambly. By June 18, the Continental Army had abandoned Canada.

== Legacy ==
Thomas is the namesake of Thomaston, Maine.
