= 8th Massachusetts Regiment =

Sargent's Regiment 16th Continental Regiment 8th Massachusetts Regiment
- Active: 1775-1783
- Allegiance: Continental Congress of the United States
- Type: Infantry
- Part of: Massachusetts Line
- Engagements: American Revolutionary War; Battle of Bunker Hill; New York and New Jersey Campaign; Battle of Trenton; Battle of Princeton; Battle of Saratoga

Commanders
- Notable commanders: Colonel Paul Dudley Sargent; Colonel Michael Jackson

The 8th Massachusetts Regiment, also known as 16th Continental Regiment and Sargent's Regiment, was raised on April 23, 1775, under Colonel Paul Dudley Sargent at Cambridge, Massachusetts. The regiment would see action at the Battle of Bunker Hill, New York and New Jersey Campaign, Battle of Trenton, Battle of Princeton and the Battle of Saratoga. The regiment was furloughed June 12, 1783, at West Point, New York and disbanded on November 3, 1783.
