= 2nd Massachusetts Regiment =

Thomas' Regiment Bailey's Regiment 23rd Continental Regiment 2nd Massachusetts Regiment
- Active: 1775-1783
- Allegiance: Continental Congress of the United States
- Type: Infantry
- Part of: Massachusetts Line
- Engagements: Bunker Hill, Trenton, Princeton, Saratoga, Monmouth

Commanders
- Notable commanders: Colonel John Thomas; Colonel John Bailey

The 2nd Massachusetts Regiment, also known as Thomas' Regiment and Bailey's Regiment, was a unit of the Massachusetts Line in the 1777 establishment of the Continental Army. It was a successor to a number of Massachusetts provincial regiments from the army's 1775 establishment (principally the 2nd Massachusetts Bay Provincial Regiment), and was known as the 23rd Continental Regiment during the 1776 establishment. It was raised on April 23, 1775, under Colonel John Thomas outside of Boston, Massachusetts; the commanding officer for much of its existence was Colonel John Bailey. The regiment would see action at the Battle of Bunker Hill, New York Campaign, Battle of Trenton, Battle of Princeton, Battle of Saratoga and the Battle of Monmouth. The regiment was also encamped during the winter of 1777–1778 at Valley Forge. The regiment was disbanded on November 3, 1783, at West Point, New York.
