= List of United States militia units in the American Revolutionary War =

American militiamen from different units in 1774–1775

Each of the Thirteen Colonies that became the United States when they declared their independence in 1776 had militia units that served on the Patriot side during the American Revolutionary War. The history of militia in the United States dates from the colonial era. Based on the English system, colonial militias were drawn from the body of adult male citizens of a community, town, or local region. Because there was no standing English Army before the English Civil War, and subsequently the English Army and later the British Army had few regulars garrisoning North America, colonial militia served a vital role in local conflicts, particularly in the French and Indian Wars. Before shooting began in the American War of Independence, American revolutionaries took control of the militia system, reinvigorating training and excluding men with Loyalist inclinations. Regulation of the militia was codified by the Second Continental Congress with the Articles of Confederation. The revolutionaries also created a full-time regular army—the Continental Army—but because of manpower shortages the militia provided short-term support to the regulars in the field throughout the war.

In colonial era Anglo-American usage, militia service was distinguished from military service in that the latter was normally a commitment for a fixed period of time of at least a year, for a salary, whereas militia was only to meet a threat, or prepare to meet a threat, for periods of time expected to be short. Militia persons were normally expected to provide their own weapons, equipment, or supplies, although they may later be compensated for losses or expenditures.

Many of the states continued to maintain their militia after the American Revolution until after the U.S. Civil War. Many of the state National Guards trace their roots to the militia from the American Revolution.

The lists below show the known militia units by state for the original colonies plus Vermont. (Note: The lists of state militias do not contain Continental Army units, unless they also served as militia units at some time during the Revolutionary War. Some states also had state units that were not militia or Continental Army.)

== Connecticut ==
Revolutionary War units:

- Governor's Guard:
  - 1st Company Governor's Foot Guard, 1771
  - 2nd Company Governor's Foot Guard, 1775
  - 1st Company Governor's Horse Guards, 1778
- 2nd Connecticut Light Horse, 1777
- 5th Connecticut Light Horse, 1776–79
- Backus' Regiment of Light Horse, 1776
- Skinner's Regiment of Light Horse, 1776
- Starr's Regiment of Light Horse, 1779
- Seymour's Regiment of Light Dragoons
- 1st Battalion State Regiment, 1776–77
- 1st Regiment of Militia, 1778–79
- 2nd Regiment of Militia, 1776
- 3rd Regiment of Foot, 1775
- 3rd Regiment of Militia, 1776
- 4th Regiment of Militia, 1775–76
- 5th Regiment of Militia, 1775–76
- 7th Regiment of Militia, 1775–76
- 8th Regiment of Militia, 1775–76
- 8th Regiment of Militia, 1780
- 9th Regiment of Militia, 1776–81
- 10th Regiment of Militia, 1776–77
- 11th Regiment of Militia, 1774
- 12th Regiment of Militia, 1776
- 13th Regiment of Militia, 1776
- 16th Regiment of Militia, 1776
- 18th Regiment of Militia, 1776
- 19th Regiment of Militia, 1774-83
- 20th Regiment of Militia, 1779–81
- 21st Regiment of Militia, 1778–81
- 22nd Regiment of Militia, 1776
- 25th Regiment of Militia, 1776–78
- 33rd Regiment of Militia, 1775
- Belding's Regiment, 1777
- Bradley's Regiment, 1776–77
- Burrell's Regiment, 1776–77
- Canfield's Regiment of Militia, 1781
- Chapman's Regiment of Militia, 1778
- Chester's Regiment of Militia, 1776–77
- Cook's Regiment of Militia, 1777
- Douglas' Regiment of Levies, 1776
- Douglas' Regiment, 1776
- Elmore's Battalion, 1776–77
- Ely's Regiment, 1777
- Enos' Regiment, 1776–77
- Gallup's Regiment, 1779
- Gay's Regiment, 1776
- Hooker's Regiment of Militia, 1777
- Johnson's Regiment of Militia, 1778
- Latimer's Regiment of Militia, 1777–78
- Lewis' Regiment, 1776
- Mason's Regiment of Militia, 1778
- McClellan's Regiment, 1777–82
- Mead's Regiment of Militia, 1779
- Mott's Regiment of Militia, 1776
- Newberry's Regiment, 1777
- Parker's Company of Teamsters, 1778
- Parson's Regiment, 1776
- Parson's Regiment of Militia, 1777
- Porter's Regiment, 1781
- Sage's Regiment, 1776–77
- Silliman's Regiment, 1776
- Talcott's Regiment, 1776
- Thompson's Company
- Thompson's Regiment, 1777
- Tyler's Regiment, 1777
- Ward's Regiment, 1777
- Waterbury's Regiment, 1776–78
- Whiting's Regiment, 1777
- Wells' Regiment of Militia, 1779
- Wells' Regiment, 1780–81

== Delaware ==
The first militia in Delaware was formed when Swedish settlers took up arms to defend Fort Christina (which was at the time a Swedish settlement) against Dutch invaders. During the American Revolutionary War, Delaware raised several units of militia in support of the Patriot side of the war. In the War of 1812, all of the Delaware volunteer units saw combat at Lewes, where they comprised the majority of an American force that drove off a Royal Navy squadron seeking control of the Delaware River. Despite the federal government initially prohibiting volunteer units the Mexican–American War, a volunteer unit raised in Delaware would serve in the battles of Contreras, Cherubusco, Molino del Rey, and Chapultepec, losing so many men that the unit was nicknamed "The Bloody 11th." During the American Civil War, Delaware would raise multiple units in support of the Union cause. During the Spanish–American War, the 1st Delaware Volunteer Infantry was mustered into federal service but not deployed abroad. With the passage of the Militia Act of 1903, all state militia units were folded into the National Guard of the United States, largely turning the state militias from a state-funded and controlled force to a reserve component of the federal military.

Revolutionary War Units:

- 1st Battalion, New Castle County, 1777
- 2nd Regiment, New Castle County, 1778–81
- 2nd Battalion of Militia, 1776
- 2nd Regiment of Militia, 1780
- 7th Regiment of Militia, 1782
- Flying Camp Battalion, 1776
- Kent County Militia
- Latimer's Independent Company, 1776

== Georgia ==
The Georgia Militia existed from 1733 to 1879. It was originally planned by General James Oglethorpe prior to the founding of the Province of Georgia, the British colony that would become the U.S. state of Georgia. One reason for the founding of the colony was to act as a buffer between the Spanish settlements in Florida and the British colonies to the north.

Revolutionary War units:

- Emanuel's Regiment of Militia, 1781–82
- Georgia Hussars, 1736
- Liberty Independent Troop, 1776
- 1st Brigade Georgia Militia
- 1st Regiment Georgia Militia, Light Horse Troop

== Maryland ==
- First Company of the First Battalion Of Maryland, Smallwood's Annapolis, 1776
- Second Company of the First Battalion Of Maryland, Annapolis, 1776
- Third Company of the First Battalion Of Maryland, Annapolis, 1776
- Fourth Company of the First Battalion Of Maryland, Baltimore, 1776
- Fifth Company of the First Battalion Of Maryland, Nathaniel Ramsey's, Annapolis, 1776
- Sixth Company of the First Battalion Of Maryland, Annapolis, 1776
- Seventh Company of the First Battalion Of Maryland, Annapolis, 1776
- Eighth Company of the First Battalion of Maryland, Samuel Smith's, Baltimore, 1776
- Ninth Company of Light Infantry, Annapolis, 1776
- First Independent Maryland Company, Charles and Calvert Counties, 1776
- Second Independent Company, Somerset County (Gunby), 1776
- Third Independent Maryland Company, Worcester County, 1776
- Fourth Independent Maryland Company, Talbot County, 1776
- Fifth Independent Maryland Company, St. Mary's County, 1776
- Sixth Independent Company, Dorchester County (Thomas Woolford), 1776
- Seventh Independent Company, Queen Anne's and Kent Counties, 1776
- Gale's Independent Company of Artillery, 1779–80
- Smith's Artillery, 2nd and 3rd Companies, 1783
- 34th Battalion of Militia, 1776
- 37th Battalion of Militia, 1777
- Extraordinary Regiment, 1780
- Flying Camp Regiment (Ewing's), 1776
- Flying Camp Regiment (Griffith's), 1776
- Flying Camp Regiment (Richardson's), 1776
- Flying Camp Militia, Harford County (Capt. Robert Harris'), 1776
- Flying Camp Militia, Harford Greens (Harford County, Capt. Francis Holland), 1776
- Flying Camp Militia, Montgomery County (Capt. Richard Smith's), 1776
- Flying Camp Militia (Capt. John Oglevee's), Cecil County 1776
- Flying Camp Militia, St. Mary's County (Capt. Forrest)
- Flying Camp Militia, Charles County (Capt. Hanson), 1776
- Flying Camp Militia, Calvert County (Capt. Brooke), 1776
- Flying Camp Militia, Cecil County (Maxwell's), 1776
- Flying Camp Militia, Prince George's County (Capt. Hawkins Lowe), 1776
- Flying Camp Militia (Bowie's Third Battalion), 1776
- Flying Camp Militia, Frederick County (Hynes) 1776
- Flying Camp Militia in the Lower District of Frederick County (Burgess'), 1776
- Flying Camp Militia, Frederick County (Maroney's), 1776
- Eleventh Battalion, Prince George's County (Capt. Magruder) 1776
- Flying Camp Militia, 18th Battalion, Cecil County (George's), 1776
- Flying Camp Militia, Kent County (Perkins), 1776
- Capt. Clapsadle's Return Guns, 1776
- Anne Arundel County Battalion (Capt. Norwood and Dorsey), 1776
- Capt. Tillard's Company, 1776
- Minute Company, Queen Ann's County, 1776
- Minute Company, Kent County (William Henry), 1776
- Capt. James Disney Jr.'s Battalion, 1776
- Flying Camp Militia, Capt. Mantz's Company
- Flying Camp Militia, Capt. Jacob Good's Company, Carroll County
- Flying Camp Militia, Cecil County (Evans), 1776
- Campbell's Frederick County-Upper District, 1776
- Capt. Henry Hardman's Return, 1776
- Capt. Zachariah Maccubbin's Baltimore County, 1776
- Lansdale's Detachment, 1783
- Marbury's Detachment, 1784
- Washington County Militia Company, 1777
- Captain Robert Wright's Company of Militia, 1777
- Select Militia of 1781, Frederick County, 1781
- The Ship's Company, 1777
- Baltimore Town Battalion (Yates, Bussey), 1776
- Capt. Paca's Harford County, 1776
- Capt. Thos. Smyth, Jr.'s Company
- Capt. John Dean's Queen Anne's County, 1776
- Capt. Goldsborough's Company, Talbot County 1776
- Richardson's Caroline County Company, 1776
- Capt. Fiddeman's Company
- Burk's Dorchester County Company, 1776
- Creager's Frederick County-Middle District, 1776
- Rawling's Maryland and Virginia Rifle Regiment (six companies, 1778)

== Massachusetts ==
Revolutionary War units:

- 1st Regiment of Militia, 1776
- First Bristol Regiment, 1776–80
- 1st Regiment of Guards, 1778
- 3rd Regiment of Militia, 1779
- 4th Regiment of Militia, 1777–80
- 18th Regiment of Militia, 1775
- 30th Regiment of Foot Massachusetts militia, 1775–1781
- 25th Regiment of Foot Massachusetts Militia, 1775
- 32nd Regiment of Militia, 1775
- Ancient and Honorable Artillery Company of Massachusetts, 1638
- Ashley's Regiment of Militia, 1776–77
- Bailey's Regiment of Militia
- Brewer's Regiment, 1776
- Brooks' Regiment of Militia, 1778
- Bucks of America, 1781
- Bullards' Regiment of Militia, 1777
- Burt's Company of Militia, 1776–77
- Cady's Regiment, 1776
- Carpenter's Regiment of Militia (First Bristol Regiment)
- Cary's Regiment of Militia, 1780
- Cary's Regiment, 1776
- Cogswell's Regiment of Militia, 1775–77
- Cushing's Regiment of Militia, 1777
- Denny's Regiment of Militia
- Fellows' Regiment, 1775
- French's Regiment, 1777
- Frye's Regiment, 1775
- Gage's Regiment of Militia (4th Essex County Militia Regiment), 1777
- Gerrish's Regiment, 1778 (Massachusetts Line)
- Gill's Regiment of Militia, 1777
- Holman's Regiment of Militia, 1777
- Independent Company of Cadets, Massachusetts Volunteer Militia (First Corps of Cadets), 1741
- Jacob's Regiment, 1778–79
- Johnson's Regiment of Militia, 1775–1777
- Hyde's Detachment of Militia, 1777
- Keyes' Regiment, 1777
- Leonard's Regiment of Militia
- May's Regiment of Militia, 1777
- Murray's Regiment of Militia, 1780
- Perce's Battalion of Militia, 1779
- Plymouth Artillery Company organized January 7, 1777
- Poor's Regiment of Militia, 1778
- Porter's Regiment of Militia, 1776
- Rand's Regiment of Levies, 1776
- Reed's Regiment of Militia, 1777
- Robinson Regiment of Militia, 1777
- Simonds' Regiment of Militia, 1776–77
- Smith's Regiment of Foot, 1776
- Sparhawk's Regiment of Militia, 1777
- Stearns' Regiment of Militia, 1778
- Storer's Regiment of Militia, 1777
- Turner's Regiment, 1781
- Wells' Regiment of Militia, 1777
- Whitney's Regiment of Militia, 1777
- Williams' Regiment of Militia, 1777
- Wood's Regiment of Militia, 1778–79
- Woodbridge's Regiment of Militia, 1777
- Wright's Regiment of Militia, 1777

== New Hampshire ==
Revolutionary War units:

- Baker's Company of Volunteer, 1777
- Baldwin's Regiment, 1776
- Bartlett's Regiment of Militia, 1780
- Bedel's Regiment, 1777–79 (also Continental Army)
- Bell's Regiment of Militia, 1781
- Bellow's Regiment of Militia, 1776–77
- Chase's Regiment of Militia, 1776–77
- Dame's Regiment, 1779–80
- Drake's Regiment of Militia, 1777
- Evans' Regiment of Militia, 1777
- Fogg's Regiment, 1776–77
- Gale's Regiment of Volunteers, 1778
- Gilman's Regiment of Militia, 1776–77
- Hale's Regiment of Militia, 1776–78
- Hobart's Regiment of Militia, 1777
- Kelley's Regiment of Volunteers, 1777–78
- Langdon's Company of Light Horse Volunteers, 1777–78
- Lovewell's Regiment, 1778–81
- McClary's Regiment of Militia, 1777–81
- Mooney's Regiment of Militia, 1779–80
- Moore's Regiment of Militia, 1777
- Morey's Regiment of Militia, 1777
- Moulton's Regiment of Militia, 1775–83
- Nichols' Regiment of Militia, 1777–80
- Peabody's New Hampshire State Regiment, 1778–79
- Poor's Regiment, 1775 (also Continental Army, aka 2nd New Hampshire Regiment)
- Reed's Regiment, 1775 (also Continental Army, aka 3rd New Hampshire Regiment)
- Reynold's Regiment of Militia, 1781
- Scott's Battalion, 1783
- Senter's Regiment, 1777–78
- Stickney's Regiment of Militia, 1777
- Tash's Regiment, 1776
- Waldron's Regiment, 1776
- Webster's Regiment, 1777–82
- Welch's Regiment of Militia, 1777
- Wingate's Regiment, 1776–78
- Wyman's Regiment, 1776

== New Jersey ==
Revolutionary War units:

- 1st Regiment, Bergen County Militia, 1777–78
- 1st Regiment, Essex County, 1777
- 1st Battalion of Monmouth, 1777–82
- 1st Battalion of Somerset, 1777–81
- 2nd Regiment of Essex County Troop, 1778
- 2nd Battalion of Hunterdon, 1777
- 2nd Battalion of Middlesex, 1777
- 2nd Battalion of Somerset, 1777–80
- 3rd Battalion of Gloucester, 1777
- 3rd Battalion of Middlesex, 1781
- Borden' Regiment, Burlington County, 1776
- Chambers' Regiment, Burlington County, 1776
- Crane's Troops of Horse, 1780
- Eastern Battalion, Morris County, 1777–78
- Forman's Regiment of Militia, 1776–80
- Hankinson's Regiment of Militia, 1777–79
- Holmes' Battalion of Militia, Salem County, 1778
- Hunt's Regiment, Burlington County, 1776
- Martin's Regiment of Militia, 1776
- Mehelm's Regiment, Burlington County, 1776
- Newcomb's Regiment of Foot, 1776
- Smith's Regiment, Burlington County, 1776
- Shreve's Battalion, Burlington Militia
- Randolph's Company, 1782
- Reynolds' Regiment, Burlington County, 1776
- Philip's Regiment of Militia, 1777
- Seely's Regiment of Militia, 1777–81
- Outwater's Battalion of Militia, Bergen County, 1777–81
- Summer's Battalion of Militia, 1776
- Thomas' Battalion of Essex Militia, 1776
- Van Courtlandt's Battalion, 1776–80

== New York ==
- The New York Levies
  - 1st Regiment of Levies, 1780–81
  - 2nd Regiment of Levies, 1776
  - 3rd Regiment of Levies, 1780–83
- Albany County militia
  - Cuyler's Regiment of Militia, 1781–83
  - Wemple's Regiment of Militia (2nd Albany County Militia Regiment), 1777–80
  - Schuyler's Regiment of Albany County Militia (Third Regiment of Albany County Militia), 1777
  - Vandenbergh's Regiment of Militia, 1777
  - Vandenbergh's Regiment of Militia, 1778
  - Quackenbos' Regiment of Militia, 1779–80
  - Van Rensselaer's Regiment, 1779–81
  - Schuyler's Regiment of Militia, 1781–82
  - Van Alstyne's Regiment of Militia, 1777–81
  - Van Ness' Regiment of Militia, 1777–80
  - Graham's Regiment of Militia, 1777–79
  - Livingston's Regiment of Militia, 1777–81
  - Van Bergen's Regiment of Militia, 1777–80
  - Van Schoonhoven's Regiment of Militia, 1778–82
  - McCrea's Regiment of Levies, 1779
  - Van Veghten's Regiment of Militia, 1779–80
  - Yate's Regiment of Militia, 1779–80
  - Vrooman's Regiment of Militia, 1779–83
  - Van Woert's Regiment of Militia, 1779–80
  - Whiting's Regiment of Militia, 1777–81
- Charlotte County Militia
  - John Williams' Regiment of Militia
- Cumberland County Militia
  - William Williams' Regiment of Militia
- Tryon County militia
  - Campbell's Battalion of Militia (Tryon County Militia, 1st Regiment), 1776–82
  - Klock's Battalion of Militia (Tryon County Militia, 2nd Regiment)
  - Fisher's Regiment of Militia (Tryon County Militia, 3rd Regiment), 1775–81
  - Bellinger's Battalion of Militia (Tryon County Militia, 4th Regiment)
  - Harper's Battalion of Militia (Tryon County Militia, 5th Regiment)
- Ulster County Militia
  - Snyder's Regiment of Militia (Ulster County Militia, First Regiment), 1776–82
  - McClaughrey's Regiment of Militia (Ulster County) Militia, Second Regiment), 1776–81
- Allison's Regiment of Militia, 1775–78
- Benedict's Regiment of Militia, 1780–81
- Brinckerhoff's Regiment of Militia, 1777
- Budd's Regiment of Militia, 1776
- Cantine's Regiment of Militia Levies, 1778–79
- Church's Regiment of Militia 1776
- Clyde's Regiment of Militia, 1779–83
- Cooper's Regiment
- Crane's Regiment of Militia, 1779–81
- Drake's (Joseph) Regiment of Militia, 1776
- Drake's (Samuel) Regiment of Militia, 1776–77
- DuBois' Regiment of Levies, 1780
- Field's Regiment of Militia, 1777–80
- Freer's Regiment of Militia, 1777–79
- Golden's Company of Militia, 1776
- Hamman's Regiment of Militia, 1777–82
- Hardenburgh's Regiment of Militia, 1776
- Harper's Regiment of Militia, 1779
- Hasbrouck's Regiment of Militia, 1777
- Hathorn's Regiment of Militia, 1777–81
- Hay's Regiment of Militia, 1778–80
- Hearts of Oak (New York militia), 1775
- Hopkins' Regiment of Militia, 1779
- Humphrey's Regiment of Militia, 1776–77
- Jansen's Regiment of Militia, 1779–82
- Lansing's Detachment of Militia, 1777
- Ludington's Regiment of Militia, 1777–80
- Morrison co. Militia, 1776
- New York Provincial Company of Artillery, 1776
- Nicholson's Regiment, 1776
- Nicoll's Regiment of Levies, 1776
- Palmer's Regiment of Militia, 1776
- Pawling's Regiment of Levies and Militia, 1779–81
- Pawling's Regiment of Militia, 1776–77
- Poughkeepsie Invincibles (4th Duchess County regiment, New York Militia)
- Sacket's Westchester County Regiment, 1776
- Swartwout's Regiment of Militia, 1776
- Thomas' Battalion or Regiment of Militia, 1776–79
- Van Brunt's Regiment of Militia, 1776
- Van Cortlandt's Regiment of Militia, 1777
- Van Schaick's Battalion, 1776
- Webster's Regiment of Militia, 1780–82
- Weissenfels' Regiment of Levies, 1781–82
- Willett's Regiment of Levies, 1781–83
- Woodhull's Regiment, 1776
- 1st Battalion Grenadiers and Light Infantry, 1776

== North Carolina ==
The North Carolina militia units were first established in 1775 by the Third North Carolina Provincial Congress on the eve of the American Revolution. Initially, the militia units were centered on the 35 counties that then existed in the Province of North Carolina. The units fought against the British, Loyalists, and Cherokee Native Americans that aligned themselves with British forces. The units included military district brigades established in 1776, county regiments, four battalions, and one independent corps of light horse. Four regiments were located in counties that became part of the Southwest Territory in 1790 and later Tennessee in 1796. The size of brigades could be up to a few thousand volunteers. Brigades were commanded by a brigadier general. Regiments were commanded by a colonel and made up of a number of companies commanded by captains with about 50 men in each company. During engagements, one or more companies of regiments may have been involved in actions and commanded by the regimental or brigade commander. In 1778, Major General John Ashe was selected to command all North Carolina militia and State Troops. Brigade commanders reported to him. Separate from the North Carolina militia, the state provided 10 numbered regiments to the Continental Army that were referred to as the North Carolina Line.

The following are the North Carolina militia Brigades and Regiments, along with the dates established and disestablished.:

- Edenton District Brigade, 1776–1783
  - 1st Regiment of North Carolina Militia, 1780-1780
  - 2nd Regiment of North Carolina Militia, 1780-1780
  - Bertie County Regiment, 1775–1783
  - Camden County Regiment, 1777–1783
  - Chowan County Regiment, 1775–1783
  - Currituck County Regiment, 1775–1783
  - Gates County Regiment, 1779–1783
  - Hertford County Regiment, 1775–1783
  - Martin County Regiment, 1775–1783
  - 1st Pasquotank County Regiment, 1775–1783
  - 2nd Pasquotank County Regiment, 1775–1777
  - Perquimans County Regiment, 1775–1783
  - Tyrrell County Regiment, 1775–1783
- Halifax District Brigade, 1776–1783
  - 1st Battalion of Volunteers, 1776–1777
  - 2nd Battalion of Volunteers, 1776–1777
  - Bute County Regiment, 1775–1779
  - Edgecombe County Regiment, 1775–1783
  - Franklin County Regiment, 1779–1783
  - Halifax County Regiment, 1775–1783
  - Martin County Regiment, 1775–1783
  - Nash County Regiment, 1777–1783
  - Northampton County Regiment, 1775–1783
  - Warren County Regiment, 1779–1783
- Hillsborough District Brigade, 1776–1783
  - Caswell County Regiment, 1777–1783
  - Chatham County Regiment, 1775–1783
  - Granville County Regiment, 1775–1783
  - Mounted Volunteers Regiment, 1780-1780
  - Northern Orange County Regiment, 1776–1777
  - Orange County Regiment, 1775–1783
  - Randolph County Regiment, 1779–1783
  - Wake County Regiment, 1775–1783
- New Bern District Brigade, 1776–1783
  - Beaufort County Regiment, 1775–1783
  - Carteret County Regiment, 1775–1783
  - Craven County Regiment, 1775–1783
  - Dobbs County Regiment, 1775–1783
  - Hyde County Regiment, 1775–1783
  - Johnston County Regiment, 1775–1783
  - Jones County Regiment, 1779–1783
  - Pitt County Regiment, 1775–1783
  - Wayne County Regiment, 1779–1783
- Morgan District Brigade, 1782–1783
  - Davidson County Regiment, 1783-1783
  - Green County Regiment, 1783-1783
- Salisbury District Brigade, 1776–1783
  - Anson County Regiment, 1775–1783
  - Burke County Regiment, 1777–1782
  - Guilford County Regiment, 1775–1783
  - Lincoln County Regiment, 1779–1783
  - 1st Mecklenburg County Regiment, 1775–1783
  - 2nd Mecklenburg County Regiment, 1779–1780
  - Polk's regiment of light dragoons, 1779–1780 (Note: Polk's regiment of light dragoons was transferred to the South Carolina State troops in 1781)
  - Montgomery County Regiment, 1779–1783
  - Richmond County Regiment, 1779–1783
  - Rowan County Regiment, 1775–1783
  - 2nd Rowan County Regiment, 1775–1777, 1782–1783
  - Rutherford County Regiment, 1779–1783
  - Sullivan County Regiment, 1779–1783
  - Surry County Regiment, 1775–1783
  - Tryon County Regiment, 1775–1779
  - Washington District Regiment, 1776–1777
  - Washington County Regiment, 1777–1783
  - Wilkes County Regiment, 1777–1783
- Wilmington District Brigade, 1776–1783
  - 1st Battalion of Militia, 1776-1776
  - 2nd Battalion of Militia, 1776-1776
  - Bladen County Regiment, 1775–1783
  - Brunswick County Regiment, 1775–1783
  - Cumberland County Regiment, 1775–1783
  - Duplin County Regiment, 1775–1783
  - New Hanover County Regiment, 1775–1783
  - Onslow County Regiment, 1775–1783
- Independent units
  - Independent corps of light horse, 1780

== Pennsylvania ==
On November 25, 1755, the Pennsylvania Assembly passed the Militia Act of 1755. This measure 'legalized a military force from those who were willing and desirous of being united for military purposes within the province.' This was as a result of citizens' pleas for protection from the French and Indians on the western borders. Two years later, a compulsory militia law was also enacted. All males between 17 and 45 years of age, having a freehold worth 150 pounds a year, were to be organized into companies. Every enrolled militiaman was required to appear for training, arming himself, on the first Mondays of March, June, August, and November.

Revolutionary War units:

- Artillery Battalion, Pennsylvania Militia {Artillery Batteries of the Associated Regiment of Foot of Philadelphia}, 1747
- 1st Battalion Flying Camp, 1776
- 1st Battalion of Bedford County Militia, 1777
- 1st Battalion of Chester County Militia, 1776–77
- 1st Battalion of Cumberland County Militia, 1776–77
- 1st Regiment Flying Camp of Lancaster County, 1776
- 1st Battalion of Philadelphia County Militia, 1776
- 1st Battalion of Riflemen, Philadelphia County Militia, 1776
- 1st Battalion of Westmoreland County Militia, 1777
- 1st Troop Philadelphia City Cavalry, 1774
- 2nd Regiment Flying Camp, 1776
- 2nd Battalion of Cumberland County Militia, 1776–1777
- 2nd Battalion of Northampton County Militia, 1778
- 2nd Battalion of Riflemen, Lancaster County, 1776–77
- 2nd Battalion of Westmoreland County Militia, 1777
- 3rd Battalion of Chester County Militia, 1776–77
- 3rd Battalion of Cumberland County Militia, 1776
- 3rd Battalion of Lancaster County Militia, 1776
- 3rd Battalion of the Northhampton County Militia, 1777–84
- 3rd Battalion of Northumberland County Militia, 1779
- 3rd Battalion of Washington County Militia, 1779–83
- 4th Battalion of Chester County Militia, 1776
- 4th Battalion of Philadelphia County Militia (4th Battalion of Associators ?), 1776
- 5th Battalion of Chester County Militia, 1776
- 5th Battalion of Cumberland County Militia, 1776
- 5th Battalion of Philadelphia County Militia, 1776
- 5th Battalion of York County Militia, 1777
- Andrews' Battalion of York County Militia, 1777–78
- Atlee's Musket Battalion, 1777
- Baxter's Battalion Flying Camp, 1776
- Barr's Detachment of Westmoreland County Militia, 1778
- Clugage's Battalion, 1778
- Burd's Battalion, 1776
- Clotz' Battalion Flying Camp, Lancaster County, 1776
- Duncan's Company of Volunteers (Pittsburgh), 1778
- Enslow's Company of Bedford County Militia, 1782–83
- Ferreis' Battalion of Militia (Lancaster County), 1776
- Haller's Battalion Flying Camp, 1776
- Hart's Battalion of Bucks County Militia, 1776
- Matlack's Rifle Battalion, 1777
- Miles' Rifle Regiment, 1776
- Lochny's Battalion
- Moorhead's Independent Company, 1777–79
- Philadelphia Brigade of Militia {Associated Regiment of Foot of Philadelphia/Associators of the City and Liberties of Philadelphia}, 1747
- Philadelphia Light Horse Troop, 1780
- Quaker Blues
- Militia of York County
- Rankin's Regiment of York County Militia, 1777
- Reed's Volunteer, 1780–81
- Schott's Corps (Independent), 1778
- Swope's Regiment Flying Camp, 1776–80
- Watt's Regiment Flying Camp, 1776

== Rhode Island ==
Revolutionary War units:

- 1st Rhode Island Regiment (Continental Army), 1775–1783
- 2nd Rhode Island Regiment (Continental Army), 1775–1781
- 1st Regiment Providence County Militia, 1781
- 2nd Regiment Providence County Militia, 1781
- 15th Regiment of Rhode Island Militia, 1775
- Artillery Company of Westerly, Charleston and Hopkinton, 1755
- Babcock's Regiment of Militia, 1776–77
- Bowen's Regiment of Militia, 1778
- Bristol Train of Artillery, February 12, 1776 to present
- Cook's Regiment of Militia (Rhode Island), 1777
- Church's Regiment (Continental Army), 1775
- Crary's Regiment, 1777–79
- Elliott's Regiment of Artillery, 1776–78
- Kentish Guards, 1774 to present
- Kimball's Regiment of Militia, 1781
- Lippitt's Regiment, 1776
- Mathewson's Regiment, 1778
- Miller's Regiment of Militia, 1778
- Newport Artillery Company, 1741 to present
- North Providence Rangers, 1775 to present (Co A, 2nd Bn, 19th Special Forces Group)
- Noyes' Regiment of Militia, 1777–78
- Olney's Regiment of Militia, 1781
- Pawtuxet Rangers, 1774 to present
- Peck's Regiment, 1780–81
- Porter's Regiment of Militia, 1781
- Richmond's Regiment, 1775–1777
- Tillinghast's Regiment, 1781
- Topham's Regiment, 1778–80
- United Train of Artillery, 1775 to present
- Waterman's Regiment, 1776–88
- Artillery Company of Westerly, Charlestown, and Hopkinton, 1756 to present

== South Carolina ==
- Beaufort District Regiment, 1778–
- Berkeley County Regiment, 1775–
- Camden District Regiment, 1775–
- Casey's Regiment, 1782
- Catawba Indian Company of Rovers, 1775–1776
- Cheraws District Regiment, 1775–
- Charles Town Artillery Company, 1775
- Charles Town District Regiment, 1775–
- Colleton County Regiment, 1775–
- Craven County Regiment, 1775–1775
- Lower Craven County Regiment, 1775–
- Upper Craven County Regiment, 1775–
- Fairfield Regiment, 1775–
- Forks of Saluda District Regiment, 1775–
- Georgetown District Regiment, 1775–
- Graville County Regiment, 1775–1780
- Lower Granville County Regiment, 1775–
- Upper Graville County Regiment, 1775–
- Lower District Regiment (aka Dutch Fork Regiment), 1776
- German Fusiliers of Charleston, 1775
- Horse Guards, 1753

== Vermont ==
Vermont did not become a state until 1791, after the American Revolution. New York asserted that Vermont was part of New York.

Revolutionary War units:

- 6th Regiment of militia, 1780–1781
- 7th Regiment of militia, 1782
- Abbott's Regiment of militia, 1781
- Clark's Company of militia, 1778–1780
- Durkee's Company of militia, 1780–1781
- Green Mountain Boys, 1777
- Herrick's Regiment, 1775–83
- Hoar's Company of militia, 1780
- Marsh's Regiment, 1777
- Mattison's Company of militia, 1782
- Mead's Regiment of militia, 1777
- Robbinson's Regiment of militia, 1776–1777
- Weld's Company of militia, 1780
- White's Company of militia, 1781

== Virginia ==
- Culpeper Minutemen of 1775–1776
- Dabney's State Legion
- Ford's Company of militia, 1777
- Frederick County Militia, 1777
- Fluvanna County militia, 1781
- Gaskin's Virginia Battalion, 1781
- Illinois Regiment of Virginia Volunteers, 1783–84
- Captain Johnson's Company of Mounted Militia of Augusta County 1780
- Monongalia County Militia, 1777
- Captain John Preston's Montgomery County Militia, 1777
- Pendleton's Regiment of Militia, 1777
- Taylor's Regiment of Militia (Albemarle County), 1779
- Virginia Legion
- Virginia State Regiment, 1775–83
- Western Battalion, 1781–82

== Bibliography ==
- Ayres, Edward. "Militia in the Revolutionary War". historyisfun.org.
- "Militia and Continentals". Journal of the American Revolution. December 30, 2013.
- Verenna, Thomas (June 17, 2014). "Explaining Pennsylvania's Militia". Journal of the American Revolution.
- Robertson, John K. (July 27, 2016). "Decoding Connecticut Militia". Journal of the American Revolution.
- Robertson, John K. (January 13, 2016). "The Organization of the Rhode Island Militia, 1774–1783". Journal of the American Revolution.
- John K. Robertson and Bob McDonald. "Unit Roles index". National Archives., bi-monthly muster rolls and payrolls, weekly strength returns, descriptive rosters, periodic inspection reports, clothing returns, as well as a potentially broad array of “miscellaneous” unit-related archival records
