= Battle of Bemis Heights order of battle =

The following units and commanders fought at the Second Battle of Saratoga, The Battle of Bemis Heights, on October 7, 1777.

== British army ==
General John Burgoyne

Wing	Brigade	Regiments and Others
Advanced corps	Brigadier-General Simon Fraser (killed)	24th Regiment: Major William Agnew; Grenadier Battalion: Major John Dyke Acland, 20th Regiment; Light Infantry Battalion: Major Alexander Lindsay, 6th Earl of Balcarres, 53rd Regiment
Right wing Major-General William Phillips	1st Brigade Brigadier-General James Inglis Hamilton	20th Regiment: Lieutenant-Colonel John Lind; 21st Regiment: Major George Forster; 62nd Regiment: Lieutenant-Colonel John Anstruther
Right wing Major-General William Phillips	2nd Brigade Brigadier-General Henry Watson Powell	9th Regiment: Lieutenant-Colonel John Hill; 47th Regiment: Lieutenant-Colonel Nicholas Sutherland; 53rd Regiment: Captain William Hughes
Left wing Major-General Friedrich Adolph von Riedesel	1st Brigade General Johann Specht	von Rhetz (Braunschweiger Regiment): Major Balthasar von Lucke; von Specht (Braunschweiger Regiment): Major Carl von Ehrenkrook; von Riedesel (Braunschweiger Regiment): Lieutenant-Colonel Ernst von Spaethe
Left wing Major-General Friedrich Adolph von Riedesel	2nd Brigade Brigadier-General Wilhelm von Gall	Prinz Friedrich (Braunschweiger Regiment): Lieutenant-Colonel Christian Praetorius; Erbprinz (Hesse-Hanau Regiment): Lieutenant-Colonel von Lentz
Reserve	Lieutenant-Colonel Heinrich von Breymann	Grenadier Battalion: Lieutenant-Colonel Heinrich von Breymann; Light Infantry Battalion: Major Ferdinand Albrecht von Bärner; Braunschweiger Jagers Company; Braunschweiger Dragoon Regiment von Ludwig: Lieutenant-Colonel Friedrich Baum
Artillery	Major Griffith Williams	Royal Irish Artillery Detachment; 33rd Regiment detachment: Lieutenant George Anson Nutt; Hesse-Hanau Artillery company: Captain Georg Pausch

== American army ==
Major General Horatio Gates

Staff

- Adjutant General: Lt Colonel James Wilkinson
- Quartermaster: Lt Colonel Morgan Lewis
- Engineers: Col Thaddeus Kosciusko

Wing	Brigade	Regiments and Others
Left wing Major General Horatio Gates	Learned's Brigade Brigadier General Ebenezer Learned	2nd Massachusetts Regiment: Colonel John Bailey; 8th Massachusetts Regiment: Colonel Michael Jackson; 9th Massachusetts Regiment: Colonel James Wesson; Livingston's Canadian Regiment: Colonel James Livingston; Drake's New Hampshire Militia: Colonel Abraham Drake; Evans' New Hampshire Militia: Colonel Stephan Evans
Left wing Major General Horatio Gates	Poor's Brigade Brigadier General Enoch Poor	1st New Hampshire Regiment: Colonel Joseph Cilley; 2nd New Hampshire Regiment: Colonel Winborn Adams; 3rd New Hampshire Regiment: Colonel Alexander Scammell; 2nd New York Regiment: Colonel Philip Van Cortlandt; 4th New York Regiment: Colonel Henry Beekman Livingston; Cook's Connecticut Militia: Colonel Thaddeus Cook; Latimer's Connecticut Militia: Colonel Jonathan Latimer
Left wing Major General Horatio Gates	Ten Broeck's Brigade New York Militia Brigadier General Abraham Ten Broeck	1st Regiment: Colonel Jacob Lansing; 3rd Regiment: Colonel Francis Nichol; 4th Regiment: Colonel Robert Killian; 5th Regiment: Colonel Gerrit G. Ven Den Bergh; 6th Regiment: Colonel Stephen John Schuyler; 7th Regiment: Colonel Abraham Van Alstine; 9th Regiment: Colonel Peter Van Ness; 10th Regiment: Colonel Henry Livingston; 11th Regiment: Colonel Anthony Van Bergen; 12th Regiment: Colonel Jacobus Van Schoonhoven; 13th Regiment: Colonel John McCrea; Colonel John Knickerbacker's Regiment; Colonel Lewis Van Woert's Regiment
Right Wing; Major General Benjamin Lincoln	Glover's Brigade Brigadier General John Glover	1st Massachusetts Regiment: Colonel Joseph Vose; 4th Massachusetts Regiment: Colonel William Shepard; 13th Massachusetts Regiment: Colonel Edward Wigglesworth; 15th Massachusetts Regiment: Colonel Timothy Bigelow; 2nd Albany County Regiment New York Militia: Colonel Abraham Wemple; 17th Albany County Regiment New York Militia: Colonel William Whiting; Graham's Regiment of Dutchess & Ulster County New York Milittia: Colonel Morris Graham
Right Wing; Major General Benjamin Lincoln	Nixon's Brigade Brigadier General John Nixon	3rd Massachusetts Regiment: Colonel John Greaton; 5th Massachusetts Regiment: Colonel Rufus Putnam; 6th Massachusetts Regiment: Colonel Thomas Nixon; 7th Massachusetts Regiment: Colonel Ichabod Alden; 2nd Hampshire County Regiment of Massachusetts Militia
Right Wing; Major General Benjamin Lincoln	Paterson's Brigade Brigadier General John Paterson	10th Massachusetts Regiment: Colonel Thomas Marshall; 11th Massachusetts Regiment: Colonel Benjamin Tupper; 12th Massachusetts Regiment: Colonel Samuel Brewer; 14th Massachusetts Regiment: Colonel Gamaliel Bradford; South Berkshire Regiment of Massachusetts Militia: Colonel John Ashley; 3rd York County Regiment of Massachusetts Militia: Lieutenant Colonel Joseph Storer
Right Wing; Major General Benjamin Lincoln	Warner's Brigade Brigadier General Jonathan Warner	Central Berkshire Regiment of Massachusetts Militia: Colonel John Brown; 5th Middlesex Regiment of Massachusetts Militiia: Colonel Samuel Bullard; 3rd Suffolk County Regiment of Massachusetts Militia: Colonel Benjamin Gill; 1st Hampshire Regiment of Massachusetts Militia: Colonel Benjamin Woodbridge; 4th Essex County Regiment of Massachusetts Militia: Colonel Samuel Johnson
	Unattached units	Morgan's Corps of Rifleman and Light Infantry: Colonel Daniel Morgan

== Sources ==
- Luzader, John. F. Saratoga: A Military History of the Decisive Campaign of the American Revolution. Savas Beatie, 2008. ISBN 978-1-932714-44-9
- Weddle, Kevin. The Compleat Victory: Saratoga and the American Revolution. — Oxford University Press, 2021. — 544 p. — ISBN 978-0195331400.
- Craig, Joe. “The Battles of Saratoga.” Cobblestone, vol. 20, no. 8, Nov. 1999, p. 20. EBSCOhost, https://search-ebscohost-com.rocky.iona.edu/login.aspx?direct=true&db=ulh&AN=2416003&site=ehost-live&scope=site.
- Loiselle, Brett. “The Battles of Saratoga.” Battles of Saratoga, Aug. 2017, pp. 1–2. EBSCOhost, https://search-ebscohost-com.rocky.iona.edu/login.aspx?direct=true&db=ulh&AN=17916678&site=ehost-live&scope=site.
- Seymour, William. “Turning Point at Saratoga.” Military History, vol. 16, no. 5, Dec. 1999, p. 46. EBSCOhost, https://search-ebscohost-com.rocky.iona.edu/login.aspx?direct=true&db=afh&AN=2405767&site=ehost-live&scope=site.
