= Wright's Regiment of Militia =

- Active: 1777
- Allegiance: State of Massachusetts
- Type: Infantry
- Part of: Massachusetts militia
- Engagements: Bemis Heights

Commanders
- Notable commanders: Phineas Wright

Wright's Regiment of Militia also known as the 6th Hampshire County Militia Regiment was called up at Northfield, Massachusetts on September 22, 1777, as reinforcements for the Continental Army during the Saratoga Campaign. The regiment joined the forces of General Horatio Gates and joined the Battle of Bemis Heights where they faced British General John Burgoyne. The regiment served in General Nixon's brigade. The regiment was present for the surrender of Burgoyne's Army on October 17, and subsequently was disbanded on October 18, 1777.
