= Albany County militia =

The Albany County militia was the colonial militia of Albany County, New York. Drawn from the general male population, by law all male inhabitants from 15 to 55 had to be enrolled in militia companies, the later known by the name of their commanders. By the 1700s, the militia of the Province of New York was organized by county and officers were appointed by the royal government. By the early phases of the American Revolutionary War the county's militia had grown into seventeen regiments.

== Militia units ==
- 1st Albany County Militia Regiment - Col. Abraham Cuyler, Col. Jacob Lansing Jr.
- 2nd Albany County Militia Regiment - Col. Abraham Wemple
- 3rd Albany County Militia Regiment - Col. Philip P. Schuyler
- 4th Albany County Militia Regiment - Col. Kiliaen van Rensselaer
- 5th Albany County Militia Regiment - Col. Gerritt G. Van Den Bergh, Col. Henry Quackenbos
- 6th Albany County Militia Regiment - Col. Stephen John Schuyler
- 7th Albany County Militia Regiment - Col. Abraham J. van Alstyne
- 8th Albany County militia Regiment - Col. Robert Van Rensselaer
- 9th Albany County Militia Regiment - Col. Peter van Ness
- 10th Albany County Militia Regiment - Col. Morris Graham, Lt. Col. Hendrick "Henry" Livingston
- 11th Albany County Militia Regiment - Col. Anthony van Bergen
- 12th Albany County Militia Regiment - Col. Jacobus Van Schoonhoven
- 13th Albany County Militia Regiment - Col. John McCrea, Col. Cornelius van Veghten
- 14th Albany County Militia Regiment - Col. John Knickerbacker, Col. Peter W. Yates
- 15th Albany County Militia Regiment - Col. Peter Vroman
- 16th Albany County Militia Regiment - Col. John Blair, Col. Lewis van Woert
- 17th Albany County Militia Regiment - Col. William B. Whiting
- Independent Company, Albany County Militia - Cpt. Petrus van Gaasbeck

== Militia generals ==
- Maj.Gen. Peter Gansevoort
- Brig. Gen. Abraham Ten Broeck
- Brig. Gen. Robert Van Rensselaer

== See also ==
- Tryon County militia
- List of United States militia units in the American Revolutionary War
