= Whitney's Regiment of Militia =

- Active: 1777
- Allegiance: State of Massachusetts
- Type: Infantry
- Part of: Massachusetts militia
- Engagements: Bemis Heights

Commanders
- Notable commanders: Josiah Whitney (soldier); Ephrim Sawyer

Whitney's Regiment of Militia also known as the 2nd Worcester County Militia Regiment was named after its colonel Josiah Whitney.

The regiment was called up at Harvard, Massachusetts on October 2, 1777, as reinforcements for the Continental Army during the Saratoga Campaign. The regiment marched quickly to join the gathering forces of General Horatio Gates as he faced British General John Burgoyne in northern New York. The regiment served in General Fellow's brigade. With the surrender of Burgoyne's Army on October 17 the regiment was disbanded on October 26, 1777.
