= Reed's Regiment of Militia =

- Active: 1777
- Allegiance: State of Massachusetts
- Type: Infantry
- Part of: Massachusetts militia
- Engagements: Bemis Heights

Commanders
- Notable commanders: Johnathan Reed

Reed's Regiment of Militia, also known as the 6th Middlesex County Militia Regiment, was called up at Littleton and Westford, Massachusetts on September 27, 1777, as reinforcements for the Continental Army during the Saratoga Campaign. The regiment marched quickly to join the gathering forces of General Horatio Gates as he faced British General John Burgoyne in northern New York. The regiment served in General Briskett's brigade of Massachusetts militia. With the surrender of Burgoyne's Army on October 17, the regiment was disbanded on November 9, 1777.
