= General Nixon =

General Nixon may refer to:

- John Nixon (Continental Army general) (1727–1815), Continental Army general during the American Revolution
- John Nixon (Indian Army officer) (1857–1921), lieutenant general in the British Indian Army
