= Gage's Regiment of Militia =

- Active: 1777
- Country: United States
- Allegiance: State of Massachusetts
- Branch: Colonial Militia
- Type: Infantry
- Part of: Massachusetts militia
- Engagements: Bemis Heights

Commanders
- Notable commanders: Benjamin Gage

Gage's Regiment of Militia also known as the 4th Essex County Militia Regiment was called up at Bradford, Massachusetts on October 2, 1777, as reinforcements for the Continental Army during the Saratoga campaign. The regiment marched quickly to join the gathering forces of General Horatio Gates as he faced British General John Burgoyne in northern New York. The regiment served in General Nixon's brigade. With the surrender of Burgoyne's Army on October 17, the regiment acted as part of the guard for the prisoners to Prospect Hill and disbanded on November 7, 1777.
