= Johnson's Regiment of Militia =

- Active: 1775–1777
- Allegiance: State of Massachusetts
- Type: Infantry
- Part of: Massachusetts militia
- Nickname(s): 4th Essex County Militia Regiment
- Engagements: Bunker Hill; Saratoga

Commanders
- Notable commanders: Samuel Johnson

Johnson's Regiment of Militia also known as the 4th Essex County Militia Regiment was first called up for the Siege of Boston and Bunker Hill in 1775. Colonel Samuel Johnson was elected leader of the Regiment, his oldest son Samuel, being chosen 2nd Lieutenant.

The regiment was called up a second time at Andover, Massachusetts on August 14, 1777, as reinforcements for the Continental Army during the Saratoga campaign. The regiment marched quickly to join the gathering forces of General Horatio Gates as he faced British General John Burgoyne in northern New York. The regiment served in General Warners' brigade and would capture six British cannon at the Battle of Bemis Heights. With the surrender of Burgoyne's Army on October 17, the regiment was disbanded on November 30, 1777.
