= Cook's Regiment of Militia =

Connecticut Revolutionary-era militia unit

- Active: 26 August 1777
- Disbanded: 9 November 1777
- Country: American Colonies
- Allegiance: State of Connecticut
- Branch: Infantry
- Type: Militia
- Part of: Continental Army
- Engagements: Saratoga Campaign

Commanders
- Notable commanders: Thaddeus Cook

Cook's Regiment of Militia was called up at Wallingford, Connecticut on August 26, 1777, as reinforcements for the Continental Army during the Saratoga Campaign.

== Background ==
In October 1776, the Connecticut Assembly ordered the raising of new militia units, naming Thaddeus Cook of Wallingford Colonel of the tenth militia. The next month, the Assembly called to raise four battalions in supporting the Continental Army in March 1777. Thaddeus Cook of Wallingford was named commander of the Second Connecticut battalion, of which the name Cook's Regiment would be derived.

=== Stillwater ===
In the summer of 1777, two regiments of Connecticut militia were ordered to support the gathering forces of Gen. Horatio Gates as he faced British General John Burgoyne in northern New York. One of these was Cook's Regiment, the other was commanded by Col Jonathan Latimer of New London, Connecticut. Cook's regiment arrived on September 10 and was assigned to General Poor's brigade. The regiment would participate in both Battles of Saratoga.

With the surrender of Burgoyne's Army on October 17, the regiment was disbanded on November 9, 1777.
