= Sparhawk's Regiment of Militia =

- Active: 1776–1777
- Allegiance: State of Massachusetts
- Type: Infantry
- Part of: Massachusetts militia
- Engagements: Saratoga Campaign

Commanders
- Notable commanders: Jonas Wilder; Nathan Sparhawk

Sparhawk's Regiment of Militia, also known as the 7th Worcester County Militia Regiment. The Regiment took its name from its commander, Col. Nathan Sparhawk. The regiment spent the winter of 1776–1777 with Gen. George Washington's main army at Morristown, New Jersey. The regiment was again called up at Barre, Massachusetts on August 16, 1777, as reinforcements for the Continental Army during the Saratoga Campaign. The regiment marched quickly to join John Stark at Bennington, Vermont and then to General Horatio Gates at Saratoga, New York as he faced British General John Burgoyne in northern New York. The regiment served in General Warner's brigade. With the surrender of Burgoyne's Army on October 17 the regiment was disbanded on October 18, 1777.
