= May's Regiment of Militia =

- Active: 1777
- Allegiance: State of Massachusetts
- Type: Infantry
- Part of: Massachusetts militia
- Engagements: Bemis Heights

Commanders
- Notable commanders: Ezra May

May's Regiment of Militia also known as the 2nd Hampshire County Militia Regiment was called up at Southampton, Massachusetts on September 20, 1777, as reinforcements for the Continental Army during the Saratoga Campaign. The regiment marched quickly to join the gathering forces of Gen. Horatio Gates as he faced British General John Burgoyne in northern New York. The regiment served in General Nixon's brigade. With the surrender of Burgoyne's Army on October 17, the regiment was disbanded on October 18, 1777.
