= Cogswell's Regiment of Militia =

- Active: 1775–1777
- Allegiance: State of Massachusetts
- Type: Infantry
- Part of: Massachusetts militia
- Engagements: Bemis Heights

Commanders
- Notable commanders: Jonathan Cogswell and Charles Smith

Cogswell's Regiment of Militia also known as the 3rd Essex County Militia Regiment was called up at Ipswich, Massachusetts on April 19, 1775, during the Battles of Lexington and Concord and to guard the Massachusetts coast from July 1775 to January 1776. The regiment would also be called up on September 20, 1777, as reinforcements for the Continental Army during the Saratoga campaign. The regiment marched quickly to join the gathering forces of Gen. Horatio Gates as he faced British Gen. John Burgoyne in northern New York. The regiment served in Gen. Nixion's brigade.

With the surrender of Burgoyne's Army on October 17, the regiment acted as part of the guard for the prisoners to Prospect Hill and disbanded on November 7, 1777.
