= Storer's Regiment of Militia =

- Active: 1777
- Allegiance: State of Massachusetts
- Type: Infantry
- Part of: Massachusetts militia
- Engagements: Saratoga Campaign

Commanders
- Notable commanders: Joseph Storer

Storer's Regiment of Militia also known as the 3rd York County Militia Regiment was called up at York County, Maine then part of Massachusetts on August 14, 1777, as reinforcements for the Continental Army during the Saratoga Campaign. The regiment marched quickly to join the gathering forces of General Horatio Gates as he faced British General John Burgoyne in northern New York. The regiment was assigned to Gen. John Paterson's Brigade on October 3, 1777. With the surrender of Burgoyne's Army on October 17 the regiment was disbanded on November 30, 1777, at Queman's Heights.
