= John Paterson (New York politician) =

American politician (1744–1808)

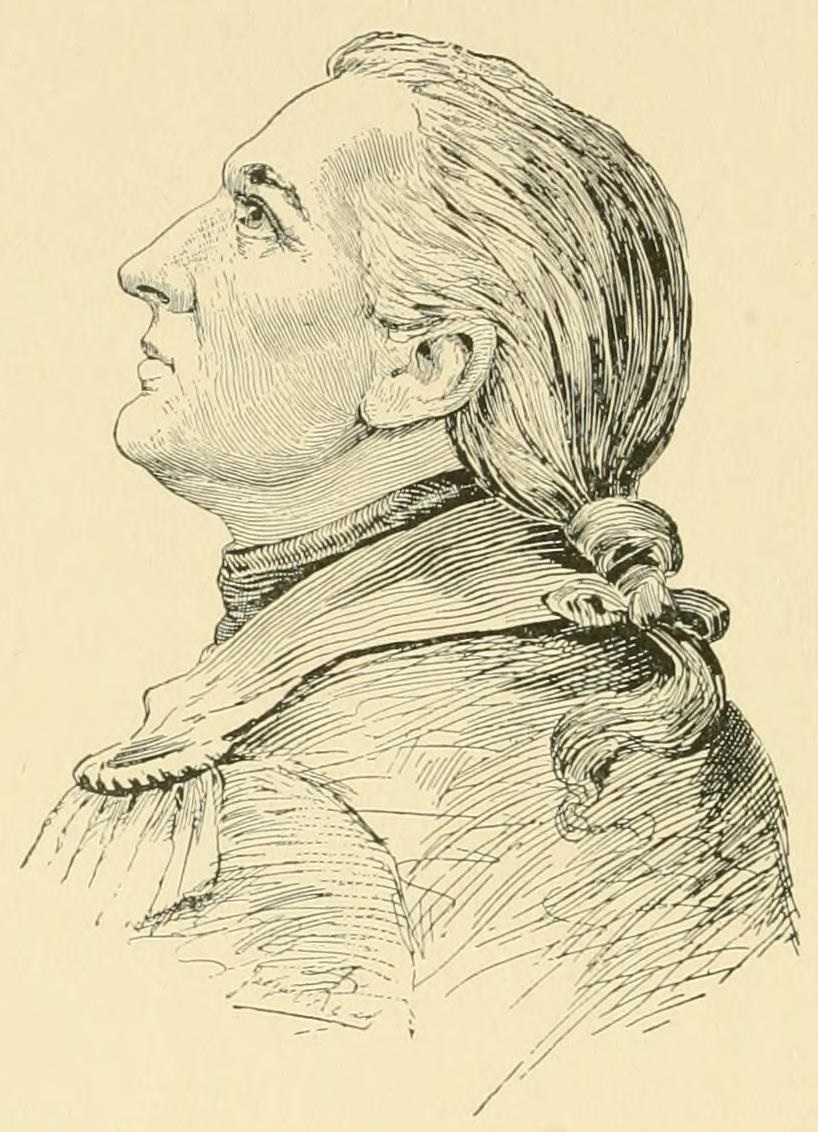
- Illustration depicting Paterson as shown on monument at Monmouth Battlefield State Park

Member of the U.S. House of Representatives from New York's 16th district
- In office March 4, 1803 – March 3, 1805
- Preceded by: Constituency established
- Succeeded by: Uri Tracy

Personal details
- Born: John Paterson; 1744 Farmington or New Britain, Connecticut, British America
- Died: July 19, 1808 (aged 63–64) Lisle, New York, U.S.
- Resting place: Church on the Hill Cemetery; Lenox, Massachusetts, U.S.
- Party: Democratic-Republican Party
- Spouse: Elizabeth Lee (m. 1766)
- Children: 7
- Parent(s): Major John Paterson (1708–1762); Ruth (Bird) Paterson
- Education: Yale College
- Profession: Attorney; Farmer

Military service
- Allegiance: United States of America
- Branch/service: Massachusetts Militia; Continental Army
- Years of service: 1774–1775, 1786–1791 (Militia); 1775–1783 (Army)
- Rank: Major General
- Battles/wars: American Revolutionary War; Siege of Boston; Battle of Bunker Hill; Invasion of Quebec; Battle of Trenton; Battle of Princeton; Saratoga Campaign; Battle of Monmouth

John Paterson (often spelled Patterson) (1744 – July 19, 1808) was a major general in the Continental Army during the American Revolution, and a U.S. Congressman from New York.

== Early life ==
Paterson was born in 1744 in either Farmington or New Britain in the Connecticut Colony. His mother was Ruth (Bird) Paterson, and his father Colonel John Paterson (1708–1762), was a militia veteran of the French and Indian War, who died during the Siege of Havana. He graduated from Yale College in 1762, studied law, attained admission to the bar, and practiced in New Britain. He was a justice of the peace in New Britain until 1774, when he moved to Lenox, Massachusetts. Paterson was elected to the Lenox board of selectmen and as a town assessor. The town's proprietor's also chose him to serve as their clerk, which required him to maintain records of land transactions and ownership. He was elected to represent Lenox in the Massachusetts House of Representatives in both 1774 and 1775. He also represented Lenox at the 1774 Berkshire Convention, held in Stockbridge, Massachusetts to discuss how to respond to the Boston Port Act. When the governor dissolved the legislature as pre-revolution tensions continued to rise, the people of Massachusetts formed a provincial Congress. Paterson was elected as Lenox's representative in both 1774 and 1775.

== American Revolution ==
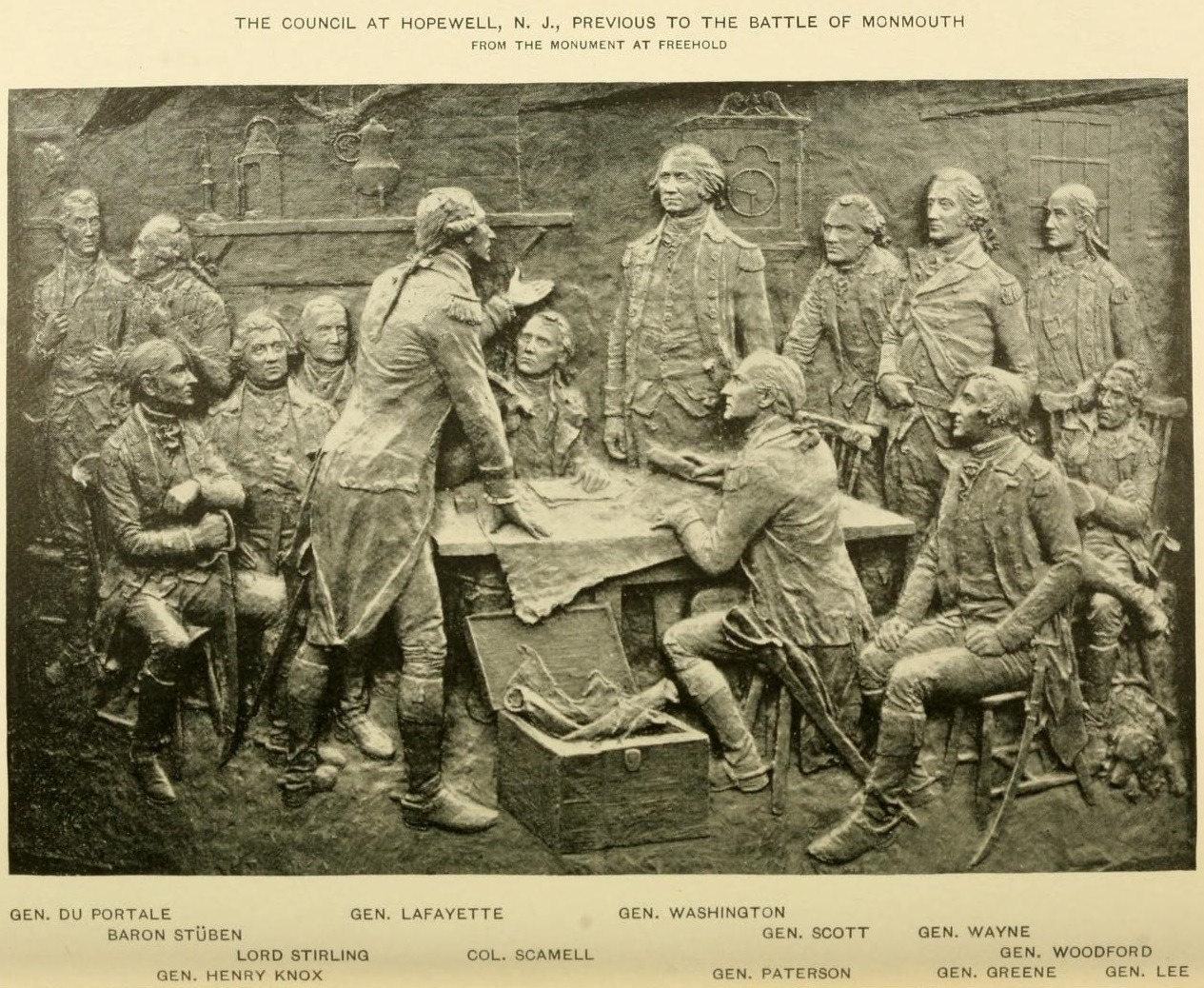
Paterson is depicted in this bas-relief sculpture, part of the Monmouth Battle Monument in Freehold, New Jersey

When the American Revolution began in April 1775 Paterson was commissioned as a colonel by the Massachusetts Committee of Safety, and he marched with his militia unit to take part in the Siege of Boston. Paterson's command, the 1st Massachusetts Regiment saw action at the Battle of Bunker Hill. After the British evacuation of Boston, Paterson's regiment took part in the Invasion of Canada and the battles of Trenton and Princeton in New Jersey. On February 21, 1777 Paterson was promoted to brigadier general in the Continental Army.

During the Saratoga Campaign of 1777 Paterson commanded a brigade of Horatio Gates' army, consisting of the 10th, 11th, 12th, and 14th Massachusetts Regiments, and the 1st Berkshire County Militia Regiment.

Paterson served under George Washington at the Battle of Monmouth in 1778. He served primarily in the Hudson Valley of New York until the end of the war. In September 1783, he received promotion to major general, and he was discharged in December 1783. Paterson was one of the last generals to leave active duty at the end of the war.

While Paterson served in New York in 1782 and 1783, his personal staff included Private Robert Shirtliff of the 4th Massachusetts Regiment, who served as a waiter. Shirtliff (also spelled Shirtliffe or Shurtleff) was later revealed to be Deborah Sampson, a woman who had disguised herself as a man in order to join the Continental Army. Rather than reprimand her, as had often been the case with women discovered in the ranks, Paterson provided her with a certificate of honorable discharge, a note with words of encouragement, and money sufficient to pay for travel to her home in Massachusetts.

In January 1783, Paterson took part in the organizational meeting that created the Society of the Cincinnati, and he was one of the society's charter members.

== Return to Massachusetts ==
After the war Paterson returned to Massachusetts, where he resumed practicing law, and also served in local offices including town meeting moderator, selectman, fence viewer, tax assessor, and highway surveyor. In addition, he was the leader of the successful movement to locate the Berkshire County seat in Lenox. (It was moved to Pittsfield in 1860.) In 1785, he was again elected to represent Lenox in the state House of Representatives. In 1786, he was commissioned as a major general in the Massachusetts Militia, and assigned to command the militia's 9th Division. In 1786 and 1787, Paterson commanded militia units that took part in the quelling of Shays's Rebellion.

== Move to New York ==
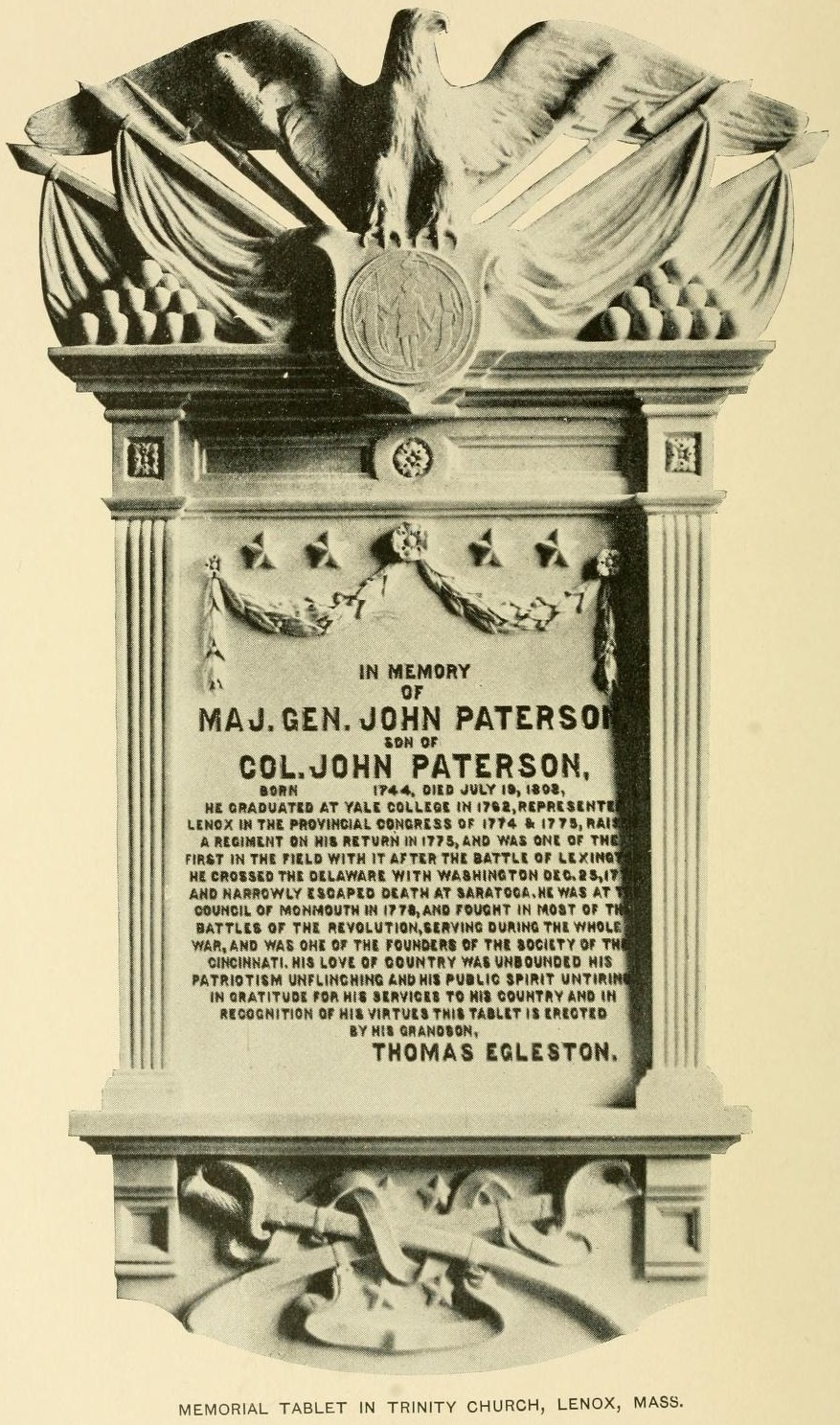
Tablet placed at Trinity Church in Lenox, Massachusetts by Thomas Egleston in memory of his great-grandfather, John Paterson.

In 1790, Paterson was one of the investors in the Boston Patent, a large land grant in Broome and Tioga Counties, New York. In 1791, he moved to Lisle, a newly-organized town in Tioga County. He was a member of the New York State Assembly in 1793. The area of Lisle where Paterson settled was later organized as the town of Triangle; the site of his home and farm was in what is now the village of Whitney Point.

In 1798, Paterson was appointed judge of the Tioga County Court, and he served until 1806. When Broome County was organized separately from Tioga in 1806, Paterson was appointed judge of the new county's court.

In the late 1700s and early 1800s, Deborah Sampson published a memoir and made a lecture tour in which she gave presentations about her military service. Her tour took her to New York, and from November to December 1802, she visited Paterson in Lisle. While she stayed with Paterson, Sampson was able to take part in reunions with other former Massachusetts soldiers who had settled in the area of the Boston Patent.

In 1802, Paterson was a successful Democratic-Republican candidate for the United States House of Representatives. He served in the 8th United States Congress (March 4, 1803 – March 3, 1805), and was not a candidate for reelection in 1804.

== Death and burial ==
Paterson died in Lisle on July 19, 1808. He was originally interred at Riverside Cemetery in Whitney Point. In 1892 he was reburied at Church on the Hill Cemetery in Lenox, Massachusetts.

== Family ==
In 1766, Paterson married Elizabeth Lee. They were the parents of seven children, including:

- Josiah Lee (1766–1846), who married Clarissa Hyde
- Hannah (1769–1803), the wife of Azariah Egleston
- Polly (1773–1790)
- Ruth (1774–1842), the wife of Ira Seymour
- Betsey (1784–1784)
- John Pierce (1787–1842), who married Sally Osborn
- Mariah (1790–1865), the wife of Samuel Kilborn

Congressman Thomas J. Paterson (1805–1885) and State Senator John E. Paterson (born 1800) were Paterson's grandsons. Scientist and academic Thomas Egleston was his great-grandson.

== Sources ==
=== Books ===
- Camp, David Nelson (1889). History of New Britain: With Sketches of Farmington and Berlin, Connecticut. New Britain, CT: William B. Thomson & Company. p. 429.
- Child, Hamilton (1885). Gazetteer of Berkshire County, Mass., 1725–1885 (Part First). Syracuse, NY: Syracuse Journal. ISBN 978-0608375823.
- Egleston, Thomas (1894). The Life of John Paterson, Major General in the Revolutionary Army. New York, NY: G. P. Putnam's Sons.
- Hubbard, Robert Ernest (2017). Major General Israel Putnam: Hero of the American Revolution. Jefferson, NC: McFarland & Company. ISBN 978-1-4766-6453-8.
- Young, Alfred F. (2004). Masquerade: The Life and Times of Deborah Sampson, Continental Soldier. New York: Random House. ISBN 978-0-679-76185-3.

=== Magazines ===
- Booth, Bulkeley (September 1894). "General John Paterson, a Soldier of the Revolution". The New England Magazine. Vol. XI, no. 1. Boston, MA: Warren F. Kellogg.

=== Newspapers ===
- "Death of Hon. Thomas J. Paterson at St. Marys Hospital". Democrat and Chronicle. Rochester, NY. February 14, 1885 – via Newspapers.com.

U.S. House of Representatives
New district	Member of the U.S. House of Representatives from New York's 16th congressional district 1803–1805	Succeeded by Uri Tracy
