= 5th Middlesex Militia =

5th Middlesex Militia may refer to:

- Bullards' Regiment of Militia also known as the 5th Middlesex County Militia Regiment of Massachusetts, US
- 5th or Royal Elthorne Regiment of Middlesex Militia also known as the Royal Elthorne Light Infantry Militia of Middlesex, England
