= Ashley's Regiment of Militia =

- Active: 1776–1777
- Country: United States
- Allegiance: State of Massachusetts
- Branch: Colonial Militia
- Type: Infantry
- Part of: Massachusetts militia
- Engagements: Bemis Heights

Commanders
- Notable commanders: John Ashley (soldier)

Ashley's Regiment of Militia also known as the 1st Berkshire County Militia Regiment was called up in Berkshire County, Massachusetts, in July 1777 and sent for a month to Fort Edward and on September 19, 1777, as reinforcements for the Continental Army during the Saratoga Campaign. The regiment marched quickly to join the gathering forces of General Horatio Gates as he faced British General John Burgoyne in northern New York. The regiment served in General Paterson's brigade.

With the surrender of Burgoyne's Army on October 17, the regiment was disbanded on October 18, 1777.

The recorded dates of service of Ashley's Regiment are contradictory. There is a document in the digital collections of the New York public library that lists the companies of the Ashley's Regiment and their number of men, guns, cartridges, etc. at Fort Edward on July 15, 1777 The following companies are listed:

- Captain Nobles
- Captain Spoor
- Captain Downinger
- Captain Root
- Captain Wheeler
- Captain Langton
- Captain Deming
- Captain Fitch
- Captain Wilcox
- Captain King
- Captain Hirick

However, Volume 8 of Massachusetts Sailors and Soldiers in the War of the Revolution lists Private Anthony Hoskins or Haskins as a soldier in Captain Spoor's Company of John Ashley's Regiment from October 15 to 17, 1780 when they "marched to the Northward by order of Brig. Gen. Fellows on an alarm at the time Forts Ann and George were taken by the enemy." Since Fort Ann and Fort George were captured by Burgoyne's Army during the Saratoga Campaign in 1777, it is likely that the dates in the Massachusetts records are incorrect and the regiment did indeed serve in 1777. The fact that Anthony Haskins' granddaughter, Freedom Haskins, stated in a memoir that her grandfather fought at the Battle of Bennington and the Battles of Saratoga supports that conclusion. It is possible that the reference to Fort George in 1780 is a mistaken reference to the Battle of Fort St. George on Long Island that did occur in late 1780.
