= Bullards' Regiment of Militia =

Bullard's Regiment of Militia
- Active: 1777
- Allegiance: State of Massachusetts
- Type: Infantry
- Part of: Massachusetts militia
- Engagements: Saratoga campaign

Commanders
- Notable commanders: Samuel Bullard

Bullard's Regiment of Militia also known as the 5th Middlesex County Militia Regiment was called up at Sudbury, Massachusetts on August 16, 1777, as reinforcements for the Continental Army during the Saratoga campaign. The regiment marched quickly to join the gathering forces of Gen. Horatio Gates as he faced British General John Burgoyne in northern New York. The regiment served in General Warner's brigade. With the surrender of Burgoyne's Army on October 17 the regiment was disbanded on October 21, 1777.
