= Manor of Livingston Regiment =

Infantry unit from Columbia County, New York during the American Revolution

10th Albany Regiment
- Active: 1776-1777
- Allegiance: Colony of New York
- Branch: New York Militia
- Type: Infantry
- Size: Regiment
- Nickname: "Manor of Livingston Regiment"
- Patron: Peter R. Livingston
- Engagements: Battle of White Plains; Battle of Stillwater

Commanders
- First Commander: Colonel Peter R. Livingston
- Second Commander: Colonel Morris Graham

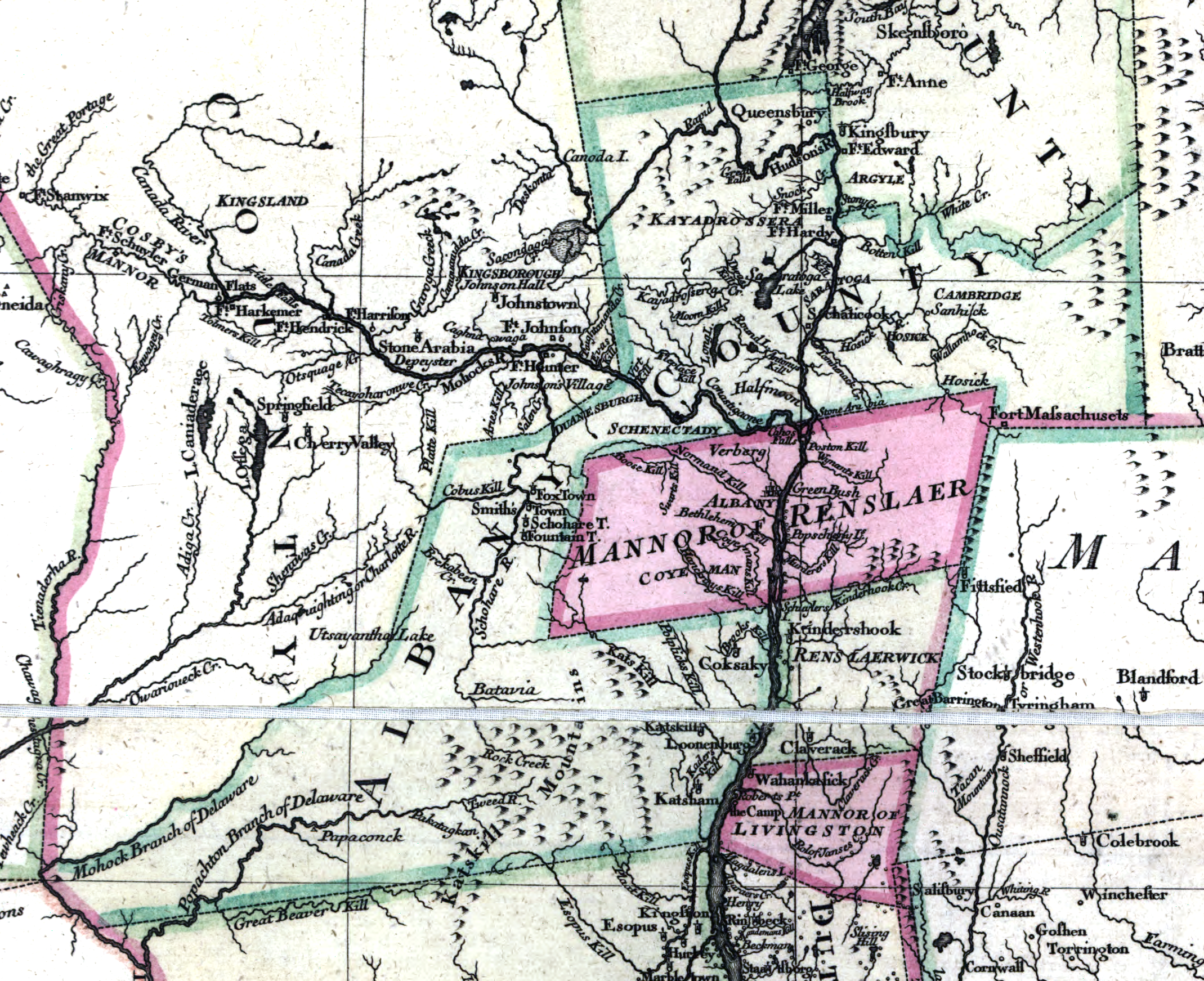
Map of Albany County, NY in 1777 including Livingston Manor near the Massachusetts border.

The Manor of Livingston Regiment or the 10th Albany Regiment was an infantry unit from Columbia County, New York during the American Revolution. The regiment was named after the Livingston Manor, which was the home of Colonel Peter R. Livingston who led the regiment from September 1776 to March 1777.

The regiment was at the Battle of White Plains (October 1776) during Washington's retreat from New York and the Battle of Stillwater (September 1777). At this point, Colonel Morris Graham took command of the regiment with the Peter Livingston's younger brother Hendrick "Henry" Livingston as the Lieutenant Colonel.

During the 10th Regiment's absence, in early 1777 a group of Tories (Crown Loyalists) began to recruit a battalion of pro-English militia in Livingston Manor. Peter Livingston reported the activity to the Claverack Committee of Safety. They called out the 9th Albany Regiment as well as men from Egremont, Massachusetts. The group skirmished with the loyalists on May 2–3 in the Battle of Ergemont. At least 20 prisoners were taken and several court-martial trials took place.
