= Albemarle Barracks =

Prisoner of war camp in American Revolutionary War

Coordinates: 38.09832°N 78.51323°W

Albemarle Barracks was a prisoner-of-war camp for British prisoners during the American Revolutionary War.

== History ==
Following Gen. John Burgoyne's defeat at the Battle of Saratoga, in 1777, several thousand British and German (Hessian and Brunswickian) troops, of what came to be known as the Convention Army, were marched to Cambridge, Massachusetts. For various reasons, the Continental Congress desired to move them south. One of Congress' members, Col. John Harvie/Harvey, Sr. and sons offered some of his lands outside of Charlottesville, Virginia. The remaining soldiers (some 2,000 British, upwards of 1,900 German, and roughly 300 women and children) marched south in late 1778 - arriving at the site (near Ivy Creek) in January, 1779. As the barracks were barely sufficient in construction, the officers were paroled to live as far away as Richmond, Virginia and Staunton, Virginia. The camp was never adequately provisioned, and yet the prisoners did manage to make something of the site, including building a church, coffeehouse, a theater, and pubs, in addition to log huts. Hundreds escaped Albemarle Barracks, owing to lack of an adequate number of guards.

As the British army moved northward from the Carolinas, in late 1780, the remaining prisoners were moved to Frederick, Maryland, Winchester, Virginia, and perhaps elsewhere.

== Current status ==
The former site of Albemarle Barracks is on private property, northwest of downtown Charlottesville at the foot of Barracks Farm Rd. and marked by a Virginia State historical marker. In 1983, the Albemarle County Historical Society erected a plaque for the Albemarle Barracks burial site. Located on what is now Ivy Farm Drive, the spot marks the location of several graves found when the land was developed for residential use. To see the marker, drive west of Charlottesville on Barracks Road to Barracks Farm Road. The marker is located on the north side of Ivy Farm Drive, in a private yard, a couple hundred yards from where this road separates from Barracks Farm Road.

Note: Though the marker was almost totally obscured by the twin boxwoods growing on either side, in 2006, as of November 2010, it could easily be seen from the road.
