= Cushing's Regiment of Militia =

18th-century US Continental Army unit

- Active: 16 August 1777
- Disbanded: 29 November 1777
- Country: American Colonies
- Allegiance: State of Massachusetts
- Branch: Infantry
- Type: Militia
- Part of: Continental Army
- Nickname: 6th Worcester County Militia Regiment
- Engagements: Saratoga campaign

Commanders
- Notable commanders: Job Cushing

Cushing's Regiment of Militia (also known as the 6th Worcester County Militia Regiment) was a Massachusetts Line militia unit commanded by Colonel Job Cushing and was called up at Westborough, Massachusetts on August 16, 1777, as reinforcements for the Continental Army during the Saratoga Campaign. The regiment marched quickly to join the gathering forces of General Horatio Gates as he faced British General John Burgoyne in northern New York. The regiment served in Brigadier General Jonathan Warner's brigade. With the surrender of Burgoyne's Army on October 17, the regiment was disbanded on November 29, 1777.
