= List of militia units of Massachusetts =

This is a list of militia units of the Colony and later Commonwealth of Massachusetts.

- Ancient and Honorable Artillery Company of Massachusetts (1638)
- Cogswell's Regiment of Militia (April 19, 1775)
- Woodbridge's Regiment of Militia (April 20, 1775)
- Simonds' Regiment of Militia (1776)
- Sparhawk's Regiment of Militia (1776)
- Ashley's Regiment of Militia (July, 1777)
- Gill's Regiment of Militia (August 12, 1777)
- Johnson's Regiment of Militia (August 14, 1777)
- Storer's Regiment of Militia (August 14, 1777)
- Bullards' Regiment of Militia (August 16, 1777)
- Cushing's Regiment of Militia (August 16, 1777)
- May's Regiment of Militia (September 20, 1777)
- Wells' Regiment of Militia (September 22, 1777)
- Wright's Regiment of Militia (September 22, 1777)
- Holman's Regiment of Militia (September 26, 1777)
- Reed's Regiment of Militia (September 27, 1777)
- Gage's Regiment of Militia (October 2, 1777)
- Whitney's Regiment of Militia (October 2, 1777)

== See also ==
- Minutemen
- Massachusetts National Guard
- Massachusetts Naval Militia
- Massachusetts State Defense Force
- List of Massachusetts Civil War units
- List of United States militia units in the American Revolutionary War
