= Gill's Regiment of Militia =

- Active: 1777
- Allegiance: State of Massachusetts
- Type: Infantry
- Part of: Massachusetts militia
- Engagements: Saratoga campaign

Commanders
- Notable commanders: Benjamin Gill

Gill's Regiment of Militia also known as the 3rd Suffolk County Regiment of Massachusetts Militia was called up on August 12, 1777, at Stoughton, Massachusetts, as reinforcements for the Continental Army during the Saratoga campaign. The regiment marched quickly to join the gathering forces of General Horatio Gates as he faced British General John Burgoyne in northern New York. The regiment was assigned to Brigadier General Jonathan Warner's brigade, having reached Bemis Heights on September 25 and 26. Gill's Regiment was on hand for both the October 7 Battle of Saratoga and the eventual British surrender. The regiment's soldiers were discharged on November 30.
