= Enoch Poor =

Military figure in the American Revolutionary War

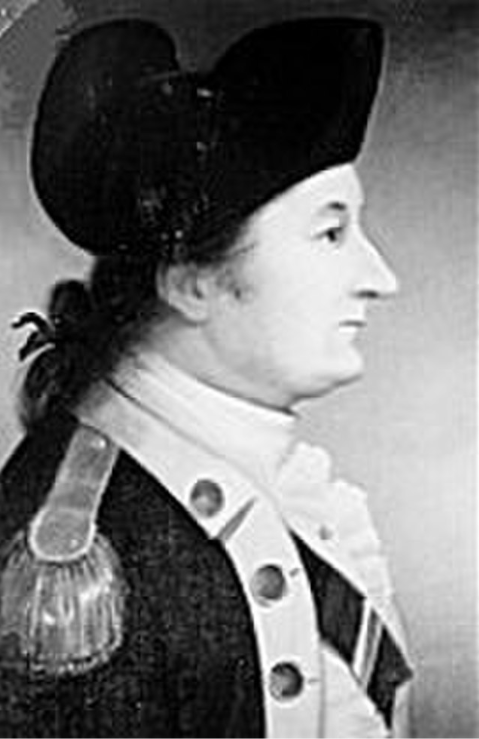
- Born: June 21, 1736; Andover, Massachusetts, British America
- Died: September 8, 1780 (aged 44); Hackensack, New Jersey, U.S.
- Burial place: Hackensack, New Jersey
- Spouse: Martha Osgood
- Military career
- Allegiance: United States
- Branch: Continental Army
- Service years: 1775–1780
- Rank: Brigadier general
- Conflicts: French and Indian War; Expulsion of the Acadians; American Revolutionary War; Siege of Boston; Invasion of Quebec; Battle of Trenton; Battle of Princeton; Battles of Saratoga; Valley Forge; Battle of Monmouth; Sullivan Expedition; Battle of Newtown
- Other work: Cabinet maker, ship builder, merchant

Enoch Poor (June 21, 1736 (Old Style) – September 8, 1780) was a brigadier general in the Continental Army during the American Revolutionary War. He began his life as an apprentice cabinet maker but rose through competence to become a successful ship builder and merchant from Exeter, New Hampshire. Over five years of continuous service, he became one of George Washington's most trusted and reliable brigade commanders.

== Early life and career ==
Poor was born and raised in Andover, Province of Massachusetts Bay. His father Thomas Poor had been part of the 1745 expedition that captured Louisburg, Nova Scotia, during King George's War. Enoch received little formal education and was instead apprenticed to a cabinet maker. In 1755, he enlisted as a private in one of the Massachusetts units raised to accompany Jeffery Amherst's successful expedition to retake Louisburg during the French and Indian War. His unit was also involved in the expulsion of the Acadians.

=== Family and business in Exeter ===
After the war, he returned to Andover, eloped with Martha Osgood, and settled in Exeter, New Hampshire, around 1760. The elopement was reportedly necessary because Martha's father disapproved of the match.

In Exeter, Poor leveraged his craft skills to become a successful entrepreneur. He "traded cabinet making for ship building," establishing a shipyard on Water Street along the tidal Squamscott River. He was in business with a partner named Thomas Parsons. This venture was successful enough to position him for a leadership role in the colony.

Enoch and Martha Poor had two daughters, Martha and Harriet. These daughters forged a significant bond within the New Hampshire Line's command structure: Martha Poor married Bradbury Cilley, and Harriet Poor married his brother, Jacob Cilley. Bradbury and Jacob were the sons of Colonel Joseph Cilley, who commanded the 1st New Hampshire Regiment while serving alongside Poor.

== American Revolutionary War ==
Poor supported the separatists as early as the Stamp Act protests in 1765. He served on various committees for Exeter throughout the period of rising rebellion. In 1775, he was twice elected to the New Hampshire Provincial Congress.

The Battle of Lexington caused the assembly to call for three regiments of militia, and Poor was commissioned colonel of the 2nd New Hampshire Regiment on May 24, 1775. While the regiments under colonels John Stark and James Reed were sent to Boston, Poor's 2nd was initially stationed at Portsmouth and Exeter to guard the seacoast. His first assignment was to use his shipbuilding skills to construct "fire rafts" to protect Portsmouth Harbor. They were sent to Boston after the Battle of Bunker Hill, arriving at Winter Hill on June 25, 1775.

=== Gaining Washington's trust ===
In the summer of 1775, the unit was absorbed into the Continental Army. Poor immediately distinguished himself as a professional officer focused on discipline. In September 1775, his superior, Brig. Gen. John Sullivan, sought to dismiss a charge Colonel Poor had brought against a lieutenant. General Washington deferred to Poor's authority and instructed Sullivan: "return my thanks to Colo. Poor for his vigilance & attention to the Service... if all Officers would use their endeavours to enforce Orders, duty would go smoothly on, & we should soon be a very respectable Army".

Poor's regiment was ordered into the Northern Department and went with General Richard Montgomery's invasion of Canada. After the disaster in Canada, Poor led the survivors of his regiment in early 1776 back to Fort Ticonderoga. The unit was reorganized as the 8th Continental Regiment and ordered south to join Washington's main army in December 1776, seeing action in the Battles of Trenton and Princeton.

=== Saratoga campaign ===
The Continental Congress named Poor a brigadier general on February 21, 1777. His new brigade, composed of New Hampshire and New York regiments, was sent back to Ticonderoga. He withdrew with the rest of Arthur St. Clair's force on July 5. Moving south, they joined General Horatio Gates before the Battle of Saratoga, and his brigade was expanded by two regiments of Connecticut militia (Cook's and Latimer's).

In the Battle of Freeman's Farm, Poor's brigade was dispatched to support Daniel Morgan's riflemen, holding the American left flank in a heated firefight.

In the Battle of Bemis Heights, Poor's brigade was in General Benjamin Lincoln's division. They faced the British left flank, composed of elite British grenadiers commanded by Major John Dyke Acland. British artillery from the heights flew over the heads of Poor's men. Acland led the grenadiers in a bayonet charge. Poor ordered his 1,400 men to hold their fire until the charge was at point-blank range. The resulting volley was devastating; it "cut Acland's men to pieces," wounded Acland in both legs, and shattered the British attack, initiating the collapse of Burgoyne's entire line. The Americans captured the wounded Acland and Major Williams along with the column's artillery. Poor then turned to his left and gave support to Ebenezer Learned and Morgan's men.

=== Valley Forge and later service ===
Poor's brigade spent the winter of 1777–1778 at Valley Forge. He led the last maneuvers in the Battle of Monmouth on June 28, 1778, after his brigade, as part of Charles Lee's advance force, retreated and re-formed under Washington's direct command.

==== Valley Forge and the Conway Cabal ====
During the Conway Cabal, a period of political intrigue where some officers and members of Congress schemed to replace Washington with Horatio Gates, Poor's loyalty remained firm. While Gates, the hero of Saratoga, was bypassing Washington to communicate directly with Congress, Poor—one of the actual field commanders responsible for the victory—was engaged in different correspondence. He wrote desperate letters to the New Hampshire Council, not for political advantage, but to beg for supplies for his men: "Did you know how much your men suffered from want of shirts, Britches, Blankitts, Stockens. & shoes, your heart would ache for them". Like much of Washington's officer corps, Poor "froze out" the political generals like Conway.

==== Sullivan Expedition and Culper Spy Ring ====
He accompanied the Sullivan Expedition in 1779, leading his brigade on a difficult flanking march to win the Battle of Newtown.

In 1780, Poor was given a prestigious command in Lafayette's elite Division of Light Infantry. That February, Washington entrusted Poor with a secret and sensitive mission. From his Morristown headquarters, Washington wrote to Poor requesting he "select... one from the troops under your command" for a "particular service." The man had to "be depended upon for his fidelity," be "acquainted with the use of Oars," and "must be a Native." Annotations for this letter confirm the man was being recruited by Major Benjamin Tallmadge for the Culper Spy Ring, Washington's most vital intelligence network in New York.

== Death ==
In September 1780, Poor died at age 44 while encamped with Lafayette's division in Hackensack, New Jersey. The official cause of death, as reported by the army's high command and medical staff, was unanimous: typhus, which was then termed "putrid fever" or "bilious fever."

- Dr. James Thacher, a surgeon in the Continental Army, stated in his journal that Poor died from typhus or "putrid fever."
- Lieutenant Colonel Henry Dearborn, in his journal dated September 9, 1780, wrote: "this evining ye Honbe. Brigadeer Genl. Poor departed this life after labouring under a severe bilious fever 13 days".
- Lieutenant Colonel David Humphreys, Washington's aide-de-camp, wrote on September 10: "Genl Poor who Died of a fever is to be buried this day".

The most conclusive evidence comes from Major Jeremiah Fogg, Poor's own aide-de-camp. In January 1781, Fogg became so incensed by duel rumors that he swore a legal deposition. He testified that he "attended him constantly during his last Sickness," that his death "was solely occasioned by a Bilious Fever, after thirteen Days Illness," and, critically, that he "assisted in laying out his Corps, and did not perceive that he had ever been wounded".

Despite this evidence, a rumor of a duel has persisted. The only known contemporary source for a duel is the journal of Private Elijah Fisher, who wrote: "The 8th. Gen. Poor died. he receved his wound by fiteing a duel with a Major". This camp rumor evolved in the 19th century into two contradictory "cover-up" theories. One theory, from the New Hampshire Adjutant-General's report, claimed he was killed by a "French officer," which was covered up to protect the U.S.-French alliance. Another, published by the Massachusetts Historical Society in 1881, claimed he was mortally wounded by Major John Porter of the 13th Massachusetts, who was then "relieved of his command."

This latter theory is demonstrably false. Porter's service records show he was not dismissed in 1780; he remained with the army and was discharged two years later, in October 1782, for an "unauthorized trip to Europe," an offense entirely unrelated to a duel. The duel myth persists, however, and is repeated on some historical markers.

== Legacy ==
The monument to Gen. Poor, just a few feet from his burial site in Hackensack, New Jersey

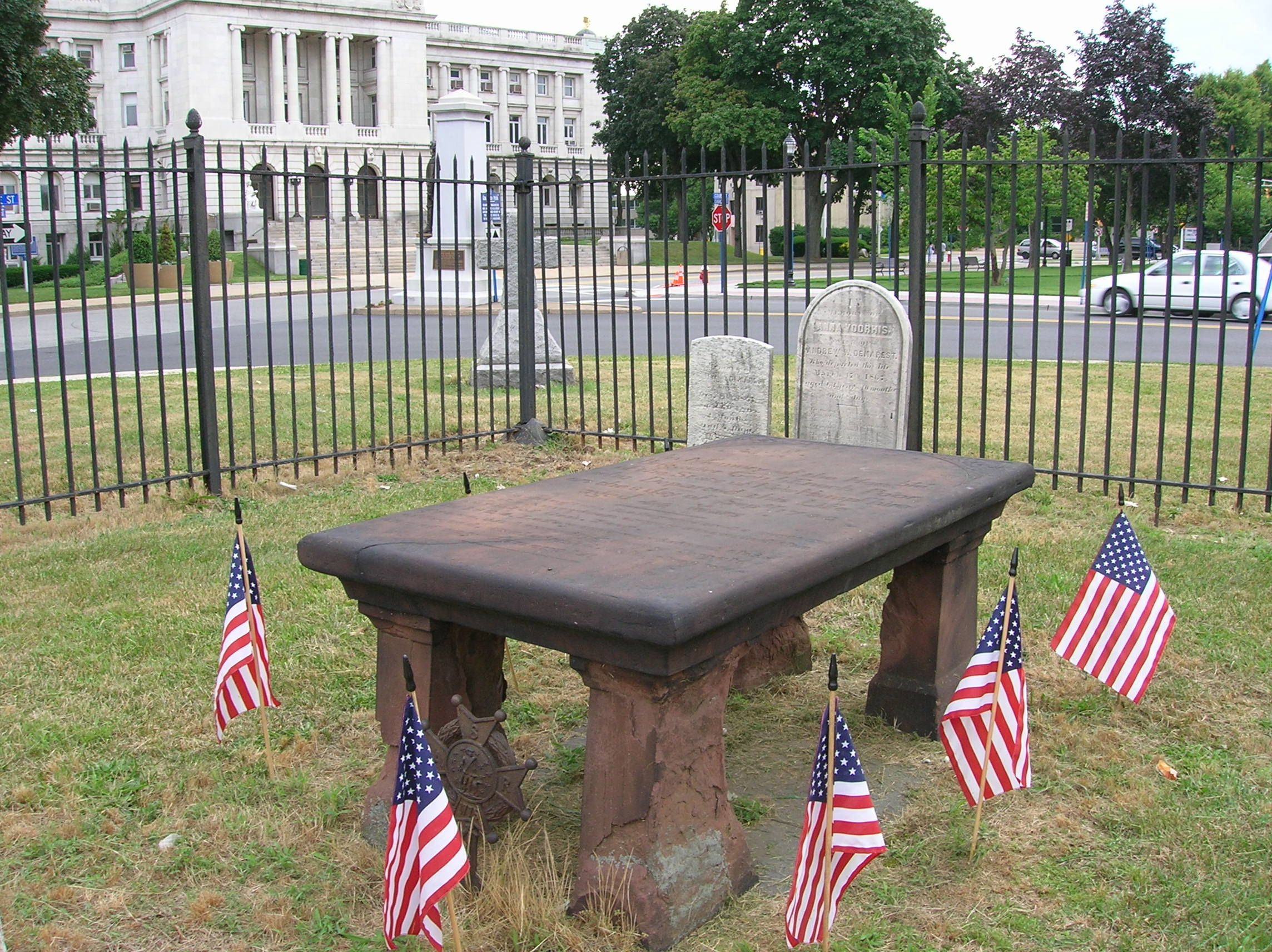
Poor's burial site. The inscription includes: In 1824, Lafayette re visited this grave, and turning away much affected, exclaimed, Ah, that was one of my Generals.

Poor's death was met with profound grief. Washington's General Orders for September 9, 1780, announced: "Brigadier General Poor will be interred tomorrow afternoon at Hackensack Church; the funeral procession will commence at four o'clock from Brower's house".

He was buried with full military honors in the First Reformed Dutch Church Cemetery in Hackensack. George Washington and Lafayette both attended his funeral. Washington wrote to inform Congress, stating that Poor "was an officer of distinguished merit, one who as a citizen and soldier had every claim to the esteem and regard of his country."

In 1824, during his grand tour of the United States, the Marquis de Lafayette made a special visit to Hackensack to visit the grave of his former comrade. Turning away with tears in his eyes, he exclaimed, "Ah, that was one of my Generals!"

== See also ==
- New Hampshire Historical Marker No. 131: Brigadier General Enoch Poor
