= Latimer's Regiment of Militia =

- Active: 1777
- Allegiance: Connecticut
- Type: Infantry
- Part of: Connecticut Militia
- Engagements: Saratoga Campaign

Commanders
- Notable commanders: Jonathan Latimer

Latimer's Regiment of Militia was called up at Windham, Connecticut and made up of men from Windham, Tolland and New London Counties on 23 August 1777 as reinforcements for the Continental Army during the Saratoga Campaign. The regiment, under Colonel Jonathan Latimer, marched quickly to join the gathering forces of Gen. Horatio Gates as he faced British Gen. John Burgoyne in northern New York. The regiment arrived on 10 September 1777 and was attached to General Poor's brigade. It participated in the fighting on Freeman's Farm on 19 September, and at Bemis Heights on 7 October. Later, it took part in the pursuit of Burgoyne's army. With the surrender of Burgoyne's Army the regiment was disbanded on 10 November 1777.
