= Van Woert's Regiment of Militia =

- Active: 1777
- Allegiance: State of New York
- Type: militia
- Part of: New York Militia
- Engagements: Saratoga

Commanders
- Notable commanders: Lewis Van Woert

The Van Woert's Regiment of Militia, also known as the 16th Albany County Militia Regiment, was called up in July, 1777 at Hoosick, New York, United States, to reinforce General Horatio Gates's Continental Army during the Saratoga Campaign. The regiment served in Brigadier General Abraham Ten Broeck's Brigade. With the defeat of General John Burgoyne's British Army on October 17, 1777, the regiment stood down.

== See also ==
- Albany County militia
