= Mott's Regiment of Militia =

Mott’s Regiment of Militia
- Active: 1775–1777
- Allegiance: Connecticut
- Type: Infantry
- Part of: Connecticut Militia
- Engagements: Saratoga Campaign

Mott's Regiment was made of men from New London and Windham Counties and served first at Fort Ticonderoga in 1775 and eventually at Saratoga in 1777.
