= Peter Vroman =

American Revolutionary War soldier

Peter Vroman House
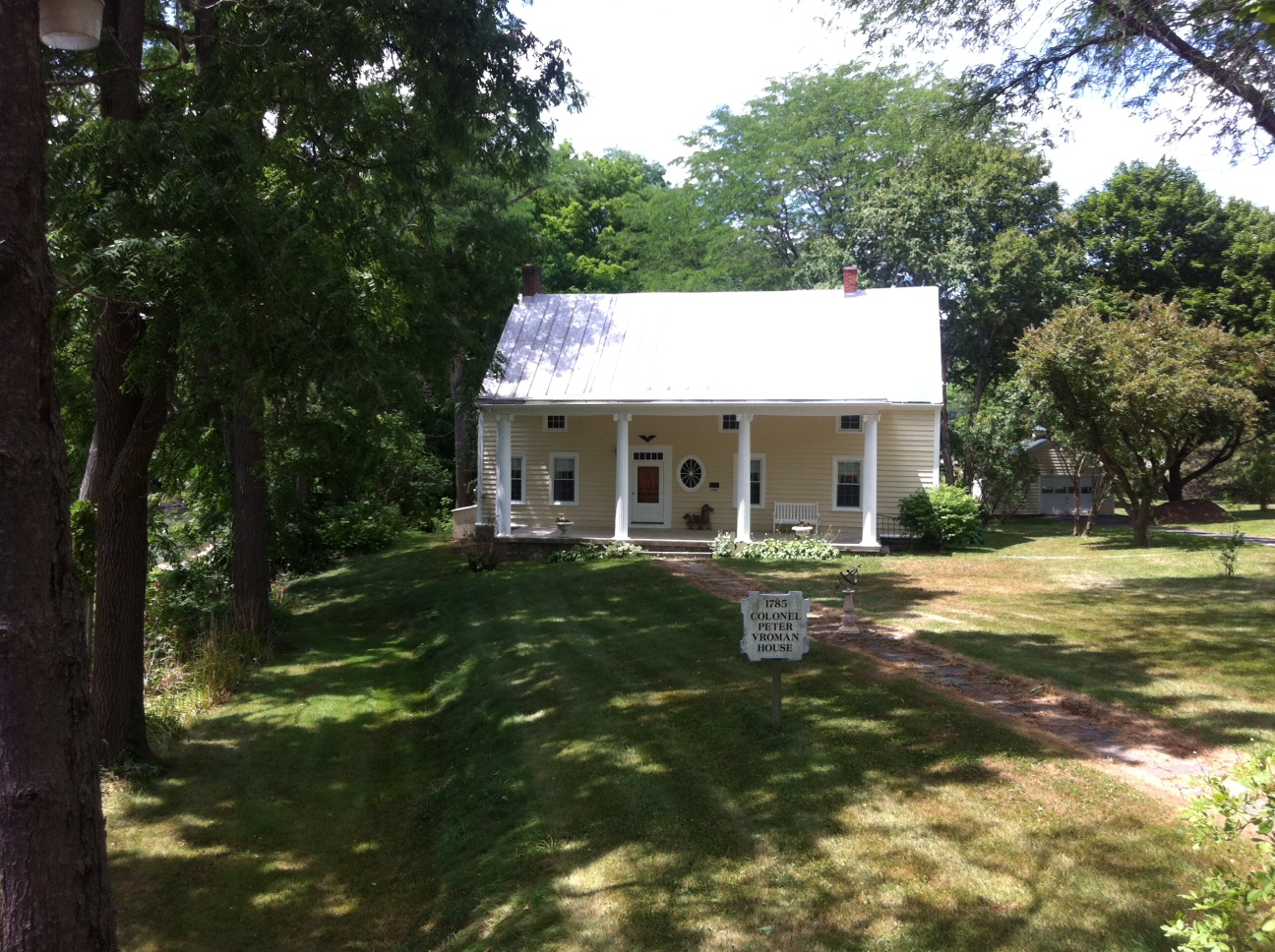
- Peter Vroman house in July 2012
- Interactive map of the Peter Vroman House area

General information
- Location: NY Route 30 and Route 443, Schoharie, New York
- Coordinates: 42°40′47.2″N 74°14′5″W
- Completed: 1785

Colonel Peter Vroman (March 20, 1736 – December 29, 1793) was an American Revolutionary War soldier from Schoharie, New York.

He was a colonel in the 15th regiment of the Albany County militia. He is buried in the Old Stone Fort cemetery in Schoharie, New York. His home is next door to the Schoharie Bridge near the intersection of NY Route 30 and Route 443, also known as "Vromans Corners".
