= Porter's Regiment of Militia =

Porter's Regiment
- Active: 1776–1777
- Allegiance: Massachusetts
- Type: Infantry
- Part of: Massachusetts militia
- Engagements: Battle of Trois-Rivières

Porter's Regiment was a militia regiment raised on January 19, 1776, under Colonel Porter at Northampton, Massachusetts and Pittsfield, Massachusetts for one year of service. The regiment would see action during the Invasion of Canada. The regiment was disbanded on January 1, 1777, at Morristown, New Jersey.
