= Vandenbergh's Regiment of Militia =

- Active: 1777
- Allegiance: State of New York
- Type: militia
- Part of: New York Militia
- Engagements: Saratoga

Commanders
- Notable commanders: Corit Vandenbergh

The Vandenbergh's Regiment of Militia, also known as the 5th Albany County Militia Regiment, was called up in July, 1777 at Rennselaerwyck, New York to reinforce Gen. Horatio Gates's Continental Army during the Saratoga Campaign. The regiment served in Brigadier General Abraham Ten Broeck's Brigade. With the defeat of General John Burgoyne's British Army on October 17, 1777 the regiment stood down.

== See also ==
- Albany County militia
