= Van Ness' Regiment of Militia =

- Active: 1777
- Allegiance: State of New York
- Type: militia
- Part of: New York Militia
- Engagements: Saratoga

Commanders
- Notable commanders: Peter Van Ness Lt. Colonel Jacob Ford

The Van Ness' Regiment of Militia, also known as the 9th Albany County Militia Regiment, was called up in July, 1777 at Claverack, New York to reinforce Gen. Horatio Gates's Continental Army during the Saratoga Campaign. The regiment served in Brigadier General Abraham Ten Broeck's Brigade. With the defeat of General John Burgoyne's British Army on October 17, 1777 the regiment stood down.

Colonel Peter Van Ness was its commander.

== See also ==
- Albany County militia
