= John Nixon (Continental Army general) =

American brigadier general

- Born: March 1, 1727; Framingham, Massachusetts, British America
- Died: March 1, 1815 (aged 88); Middlebury, Vermont, U.S.
- Burial place: First Weybridge Hill Cemetery, Weybridge, Vermont
- Spouse(s): Thankful Berry; Hannah Gleason
- Children: 10
- Military career
- Allegiance: Kingdom of Great Britain; United States
- Service: Massachusetts militia Continental Army
- Service years: 1755 (militia); 1775–1780 (army)
- Rank: Brigadier General
- Commands: 6th Massachusetts Regiment; Nixon's Brigade
- Wars: French and Indian War; American Revolutionary War

John Nixon (March 1, 1727 – March 24, 1815) was an American brigadier general in the Continental Army during the American Revolutionary War.

He was born in Framingham, Massachusetts on March 1, 1727, to Christopher and Mary Nixon. In 1755, he served in the Massachusetts militia during Sir William Johnson's campaign against the French during the French and Indian War.

In 1775, Nixon had moved to Sudbury, Massachusetts, and was a captain of the town's Minutemen whom he led at the Battles of Lexington and Concord. He and his men fought at Bunker Hill on June 17, 1775; his unit was one of the last to leave the field. After the battle, Nixon was promoted to colonel of the 6th Massachusetts Regiment. Nixon's regiment was placed into Gen. John Sullivan's brigade and took part in the New York and New Jersey campaign during 1776. In August 1776, Nixon was promoted to brigadier general, and he commanded a brigade consisting of the 3rd, 5th, 6th, 7th, and 8th Massachusetts Regiments. He led his brigade in the Battle of Harlem Heights and later in the Saratoga Campaign, when it was reinforced by Cogswell's, Gage's, and May's regiments of Militia. Nixon's brigade was involved in the Battle of Bemis Heights in October 1777, and took part in the final assault; during this attack, a cannonball passed so close to his head that his sight and hearing were affected for the rest of his life. Nixon resigned his commission on September 12, 1780.

Nixon moved to Weybridge, Vermont in 1806 and died while visiting his son in Middlebury on March 24, 1815. He was buried at a cemetery on his farm, which was later incorporated into what is now First Weybridge Hill Cemetery.

== Family ==
On February 7, 1754, John Nixon married Thankful Berry (1735-1776), also of Framingham. In 1778, he married Hannah Gleason (1744-1831), the widow of Capt Micajah Gleason, who was killed at the Battle of White Plains in 1776.

== Legacy ==
General John Nixon Elementary School in Sudbury, Massachusetts, is named in his honor, as is Nixon Road in Framingham, Massachusetts. On Nobscot Hill in Framingham, there is a trail named after him that leads to the ruins of his house site.
