= Horatio Gates =

American army officer and politician (1727–1806)

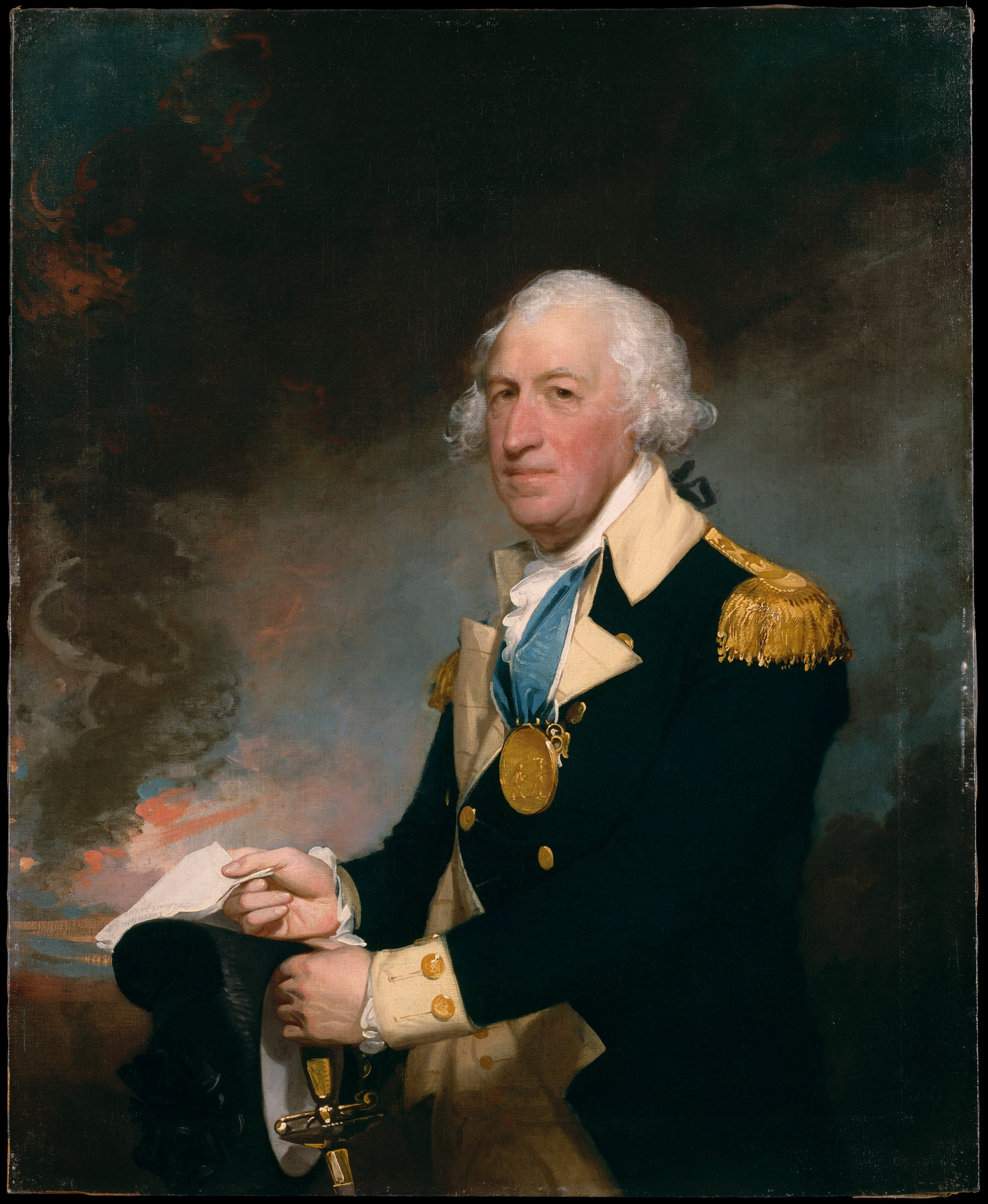
- Portrait of Horatio Gates by Gilbert Stuart, c. 1794
- Born: July 26, 1727; Maldon, Essex, England, Great Britain
- Died: April 10, 1806 (aged 78); New York, New York, U.S.
- Burial place: Trinity Church, Manhattan, New York, U.S.
- Military career
- Allegiance: Great Britain; United States
- Branch: British Army; Continental Army
- Service years: 1745–1769; 1775–1783
- Rank: Major (Great Britain); Major general (United States)
- Commands: Continental Army; Adjutant General; Canadian Department; Northern Department; Eastern Department; Southern Department
- Conflicts: War of the Austrian Succession; Seven Years' War; American Revolutionary War; Battles of Saratoga; Battle of Camden

Horatio Lloyd Gates (July 26, 1727 – April 10, 1806) was a British-born American army officer and politician who served in the British and Continental armies. During the American Revolutionary War, he led the Continental Army to victory at the 1777 Battles of Saratoga. However, his career was subsequently tarnished when he was defeated by the British at the 1780 Battle of Camden. Gates has been described as "one of the Revolution's most controversial military figures" due to his role in the Conway Cabal, which attempted to discredit and replace George Washington as the Continental Army's commander-in-chief, along with his controversial actions at Saratoga and Camden.

Gates was born in Maldon, Essex, and served as a British Army officer during the War of the Austrian Succession and French and Indian War. He became frustrated by his inability to advance in rank, so he sold his commission and bought a slave plantation in the colony of Virginia. On Washington's recommendation, the Continental Congress made Gates the Adjutant General of the Continental Army in 1775. He was made the commander of Fort Ticonderoga in 1776 and of the Northern Department in 1777, and American forces defeated a British army at Saratoga soon after. Some members of Congress considered replacing Washington with Gates after the victory at Saratoga, but that did not materialize.

Gates took command of the Southern Department in 1780, but he was removed from command later that year after the disastrous American defeat at Camden. Gates's military reputation was destroyed, and he was not given another command for the remainder of the war. He retired to his Virginia plantation after the war, but eventually decided to manumit his slaves and move to New York. He was elected to a single term in the New York State Legislature and died in 1806.

== Early life and education ==
Horatio Gates was born on July 26, 1727, in Maldon, in the English county of Essex. His parents (of record) were Robert and Dorothea Gates. Evidence suggests that Dorothea was the granddaughter of John Hubbock Sr. (died 1692), postmaster at Fulham, and the daughter of John Hubbock Jr., listed in 1687 sources as a vintner. She had a prior marriage, to Thomas Reeve, whose family was well situated in the royal Customs service. Dorothea Reeve was housekeeper for the second Duke of Leeds, Peregrine Osborne (died June 25, 1729), which in the social context of England at the time was a patronage plum. Marriage into the Reeve family opened the way for Robert Gates to get into and then up through the Customs service. So too, Dorothea Gates's appointment circa 1729 to housekeeper for the third Duke of Bolton provided Horatio Gates with otherwise off-bounds opportunities for education and social advancement. Through Dorothea Gates's associations and energetic networking, young Horace Walpole was enlisted as Horatio's godfather and namesake.

== Career ==
In 1745, Horatio Gates obtained a military commission in The Duke of Bolton's Regiment of Foot with financial help from his parents and political support from the Duke. Gates served with the 20th Foot in Germany during the War of the Austrian Succession. He arrived in the newly founded port town of Halifax, Nova Scotia under Edward Cornwallis and was later promoted to captain in the 45th Foot, under the command of Hugh Warburton the following year.

He participated in several engagements against the Mi'kmaq and Acadians, particularly the Battle at Chignecto in September 1750. He married the daughter of Erasmus James Philipps, Elizabeth, at St. Paul's Church (Halifax) in 1754. Leaving Nova Scotia, he sold his commission in 1754 and purchased a captaincy in one of the New York Independent Companies. One of his mentors in his early years was Edward Cornwallis, the uncle of Charles Cornwallis, against whom the Americans would later fight and defeat, effectively ending the War for Independence. Gates served under Cornwallis when the latter was governor of Nova Scotia, and also developed a friendship with the lieutenant governor, Robert Monckton.

=== Seven Years' War (1756–1763) ===
During the French and Indian War, the North American theater of the Seven Years' War, Gates served General Edward Braddock in America. In 1755, he accompanied the ill-fated Braddock Expedition in its attempt to control access to the Ohio Valley. This force included other future Revolutionary War leaders such as Thomas Gage, Charles Lee, Daniel Morgan, and George Washington. Gates did not see significant combat, since he was severely injured early in the action. His experience in the early years of the war was limited to commanding small companies, but he apparently became quite good at military administration.

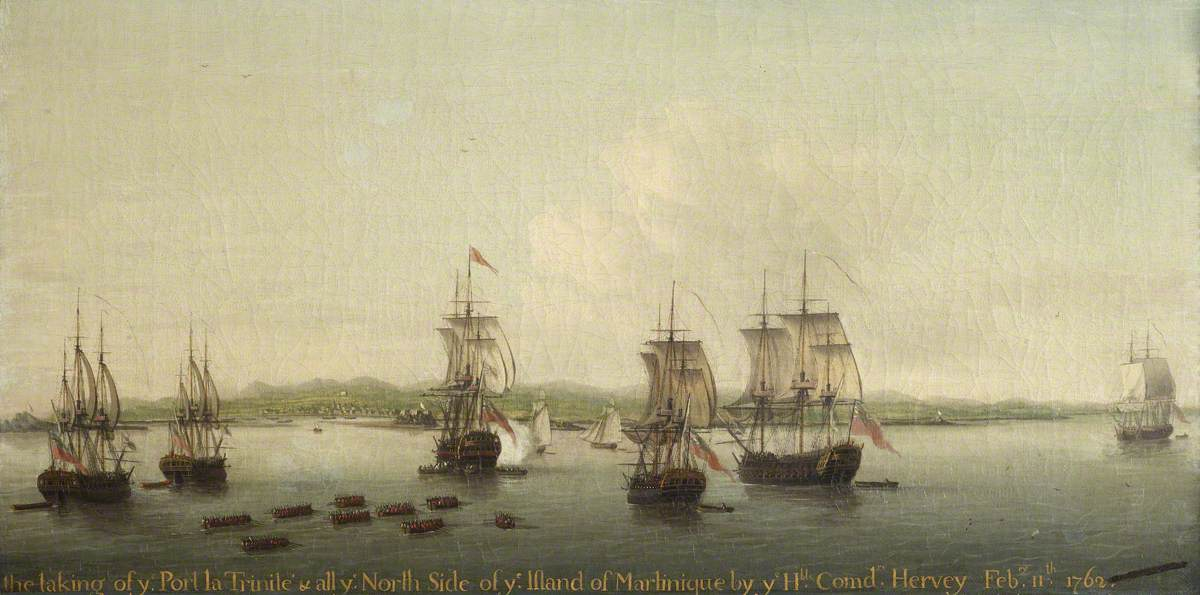
The British invasion of Martinique in 1762, which Gates served in

In 1759, he was made brigade major to Brigadier General John Stanwix, a position he continued when General Robert Monckton took over Stanwix's command in 1760. Gates served under Monckton in the British invasion of Martinique in 1762, although he saw little combat. Monckton bestowed on him the honor of bringing news of the success to England, which brought him a promotion to major. The end of the war, however, also brought an end to Gates's prospects for advancement, since much of the army was demobilized and he did not have the financial wherewithal to purchase commissions for higher ranks.

In November 1755, Gates married Elizabeth Phillips and had a son, Robert, in 1758. Gates's military career stalled, as advancement in the British army required money or influence. Frustrated by the British class hierarchy, he sold his major's commission in 1769 and came to North America. In 1772, he re-established contact with prominent Virginian George Washington and purchased a modest slave plantation in Virginia the following year.

=== American Revolutionary War (1775–1783) ===
In late May 1775 when the word reached Gates of the April outbreak of war, he rushed to Mount Vernon and offered his services to Washington. In June, the Continental Congress began organizing the Continental Army. In accepting command, Washington urged the appointment of Gates as adjutant of the army. On June 17, 1775, Congress commissioned Gates as a brigadier general and adjutant general of the Continental Army. He is considered to be the first Adjutant General of the United States Army.

Gates's previous wartime service in administrative posts was invaluable to the fledgling army, since he, Washington, and Charles Lee were the only men with significant experience in the British regular army. As adjutant, Gates created the army's system of records and orders and helped standardize regiments from the various colonies. During the siege of Boston, he was a voice of caution, speaking in war councils against what he saw as overly risky actions.

Although his administrative skills were valuable, Gates longed for a field command, where officers could gain glory. By June 1776, he had been promoted to major general and given command of the Canadian Department to replace John Sullivan. This unit of the army was then in disorganized retreat from Quebec, following the arrival of British reinforcements at Quebec City. Furthermore, disease, especially smallpox, had taken a significant toll on the ranks, which also suffered from poor morale and dissension over pay and conditions. The retreat from Quebec to Fort Ticonderoga also brought Gates into conflict with the authority of Major General Philip Schuyler, commander of the army's Northern Department, which retained jurisdiction over Ticonderoga. During the summer of 1776, this struggle was resolved, with Schuyler given command of the department as a whole and Gates's command of Ticonderoga and the defense of Lake Champlain.

Gates spent the summer of 1776 overseeing the enlargement of the American fleet that would be needed to prevent the British from taking control of Lake Champlain. Much of this work eventually fell to Benedict Arnold, who had been with the army during its retreat and was also an experienced seaman. Gates rewarded Arnold's initiative by giving him command of the fleet when it sailed to meet the British. The American fleet was defeated at the Battle of Valcour Island in October 1776, although the defense of the lake was sufficient to delay a British advance against Ticonderoga until 1777.

==== Battle at Saratoga ====
When it was clear that the British were not going to attempt Ticonderoga in 1776, Gates marched some of the army south to join Washington's army in Pennsylvania, where it had retreated after the fall of New York City. Though his troops were with Washington at the Battle of Trenton, New Jersey, Gates was not. Always an advocate of defensive action, Gates argued that Washington should retreat further rather than attack. When Washington dismissed this advice, Gates claimed illness as an excuse not to join the nighttime attack and instead traveled on to Baltimore, Maryland, where the Continental Congress was meeting. At Congress, Gates unsuccessfully lobbied Congress to reverse Washington's plan of operations, possibly hoping to replace him. Washington's subsequent successes at Trenton and Princeton left no doubt as to who should be commander-in-chief. Gates was then sent back north with orders to assist Philip Schuyler in the Northern Department.

In 1777, Congress blamed Schuyler and St. Clair for the loss of Fort Ticonderoga, although Gates had exercised a lengthy command in the region. Congress finally gave Gates command of the Northern Department on August 4.

On July 5, General Arthur St. Clair ordered Fort Ticonderoga so Americans evacuate on July 6. On July 7, Americans retreating eastward were engaged in Battle at Hubbardton, where stiff resistance inflicted over 200 casualties on the British. As Americans retreated southward, a battle developed at Fort Anne against the British advance. On July 8, a Vermont Constitution was adopted as the first in U.S. to grant suffrage to non-landowning males, require free public education, and prohibit slavery. This motivated added conscription into the Vermont Militia. After inflicting about 40 casualties, Americans burned Fort Anne and withdrew. On July 9, George Clinton was elected the first Governor of New York, thus replacing royal governor William Tryon, but the British military was re-occupying parts of NY since 1776. In August, St. Leger's Force is stopped at Fort Stanwix (siege 2–23 August) and Battle of Oriskany (6th), both over a hundred miles west of Burgoyne.

Desperate for horses and provisions, Burgoyne sent a mostly Hessian expedition toward Bennington VT, but it was defeated near Walloomsac NY, about 5 miles west of the vague Vermont border. It was about 23 miles east of Burgoyne's main force and cost him near 1000 men and failed to secure vital supplies. Their victory boosted American morale and the numbers of American militia surrounding him grew. Burgoyne stayed committed to his original plan but his overconfidence made defeat inevitable, especially because General Howe had failed to support him from New York. Any viable window for retreat quickly closed. By September 19 and the Battle of Freeman's Farm, it was already too late. The forlorn British advance toward the Bemis Heights fortification was stopped far from its goal. Burgoyne launched a second reconnaissance probe on October 7. It met a fierce, unnecessary attack by Benedict Arnold that advanced to take Breymann's redoubt.

Specific estimates of American casualties for the October 7 battle suggest about 30 Americans were killed and 100 wounded. This compared to about 600 British casualties, but there was nothing “decisive” in Arnold's attack. Some suggest that Arnold might have been drunk at the time (after Gates had relieved him of command). It wasted patriot lives because whether or not the two redoubts in question were taken, the British had nowhere to go. They had no hope of penetrating Bemis Heights and their escape routes were sealed. After withdrawing 9 miles from the Freeman's Farm area to the location of his fortified camp near the old town of Saratoga, Burgoyne surrendered on October 17. The specific site (about half a mile south of present-day Schuylerville on U.S. Route 4) is today a part of the greater Saratoga region and now known as the Saratoga National Historical Park. Maybe to save face, Clinton raided the Hudson Highlands and burned Kingston NY, the state capital, on October 16. This had no impact on the surrender.

If Arnold had been court-martialed for his insubordination, future disgrace might have been avoided. In any case, General Horatio Gates credited the American victory at the Battle of Saratoga to Colonel Tadeusz Kościuszko because the Polish engineer's strategic fortifications were crucial to the success. His strategic role with the Continental Army began at Fort Ticonderoga in the spring of 1777, as he was assigned as the chief engineer for the Northern Army in the spring of 1777. Upon arriving at Fort Ticonderoga: Kościuszko surveyed the area and suggested building a battery on a high point called Sugar Loaf to overlook the fort. He was refused, and the British later used that same position to gain an advantage, leading to the American loss of the fort.

At Bemis Heights, Gates tasked Kościuszko to survey the land and find the most defensible position to fortify. He chose these Heights to overlook the Hudson River and designed strong fortifications to frustrate British attacks that directly contributed to the American victory. Gates acknowledged Kościuszko's his critical role, stating that “hills and forests” were the "great tacticians" and a “young Polish Engineer was skillful enough to select for my encampment.”

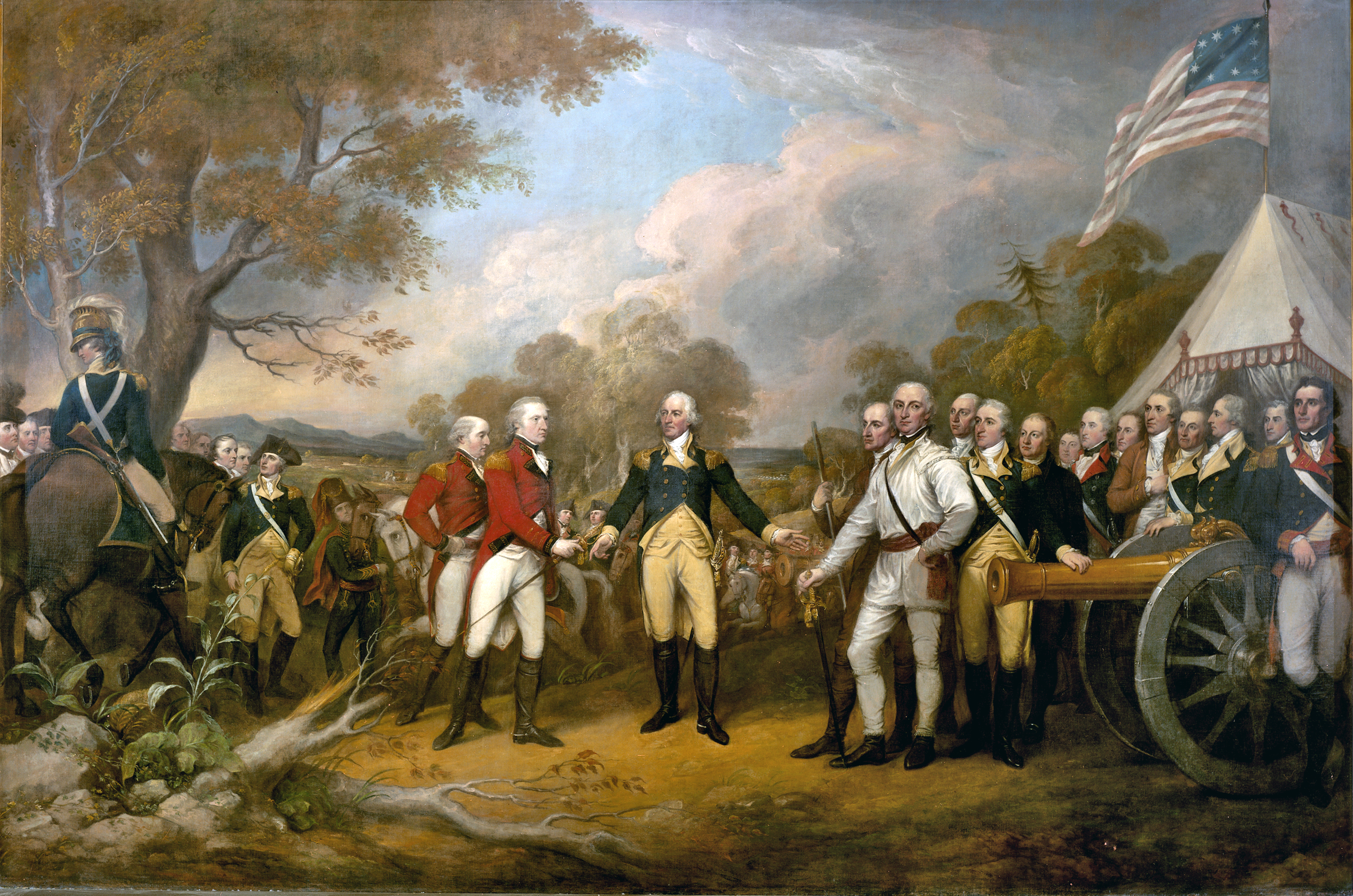
Surrender of General Burgoyne by John Trumbull Gates is in the center, with arms outstretched

Gates assumed command of the Northern Department on August 19 and led the army during the defeat of British General Burgoyne's invasion in the Battles of Saratoga. While Gates and his supporters took credit for the victory, military action was directed by a cohort of field commanders led by Benedict Arnold, Enoch Poor, Benjamin Lincoln, and Daniel Morgan. Arnold, in particular, took the field after requesting and receiving orders from Gates to engage the British, then rallied his troops in a furious attack on the British lines, suffering serious injuries to his leg. John Stark's defeat of a sizable British raiding force at the Battle of Bennington–Stark's forces killed or captured over 900 British soldiers–was also a substantial factor in the outcome at Saratoga.

Gates stands front and center in John Trumbull's painting of the Surrender of General Burgoyne at Saratoga, which hangs in the U.S. Capitol Rotunda. By Congressional resolution, a gold medal was presented to Gates to commemorate his victories over the British in the Battles of Bennington, Fort Stanwix, and Saratoga. Gold and bronze replicas of that medal are still awarded by the Adjutant General's Corps Regimental Association in recognition of outstanding service.

Gates followed up the victory at Saratoga with a proposal to invade Quebec, but his suggestion was rejected by Washington.

==== Conway Cabal ====
Gates attempted to maximize his political return on the victory he claimed at Saratoga, particularly since George Washington was having no immediate successes in battle with the main army. In fact, Gates insulted Washington by sending reports directly to Congress instead of to Washington, his commanding officer. At the behest of Gates's friends and the delegates from New England, Congress named Gates to president of the Board of War, a post he filled while retaining his field command—an unprecedented conflict of interest. The post technically made Gates Washington's civilian superior, conflicting with his lower military rank. At this time, some members of Congress briefly considered replacing Washington with Gates as commander-in-chief, supported by military officers also in disagreement with Washington's leadership.

Washington learned of the campaign against him by Gates's adjutant, James Wilkinson. Following a drunken party, Wilkinson repeated the remarks of General Thomas Conway to Gates, which were critical of Washington, to aides of General William Alexander, who passed them on to Washington. Gates (then unaware of Wilkinson's involvement) accused persons unknown of copying his mail and forwarded Conway's letter to the president of Congress, Henry Laurens. Washington's supporters in Congress and the army rallied to his side, ending the "Conway Cabal". (Note: Some historians doubt the existence of an organized effort of Washington's opponents that might be called a cabal. One of those historians, Christopher Ward, nonetheless wrote: "The actual existence of such a conspiracy is of little importance in comparison with the general belief in its existence, which prevailed among Washington's friends in the army and elsewhere. Lafayette asserted it was a fact.") (Note: Historian John Ferling wrote: "In all likelihood the supposed intrigue never amounted to more than a handful of disgruntled individuals who grumbled to one another about Washington's shortcomings. It is almost certain that Conway never belonged to any cabal, although he doubtless said harsh things about Washington.") Gates then apologized to Washington for his role in the affair, resigned from the Board of War, and took an assignment as commander of the Eastern Department on October 22, 1778.

==== Camden ====
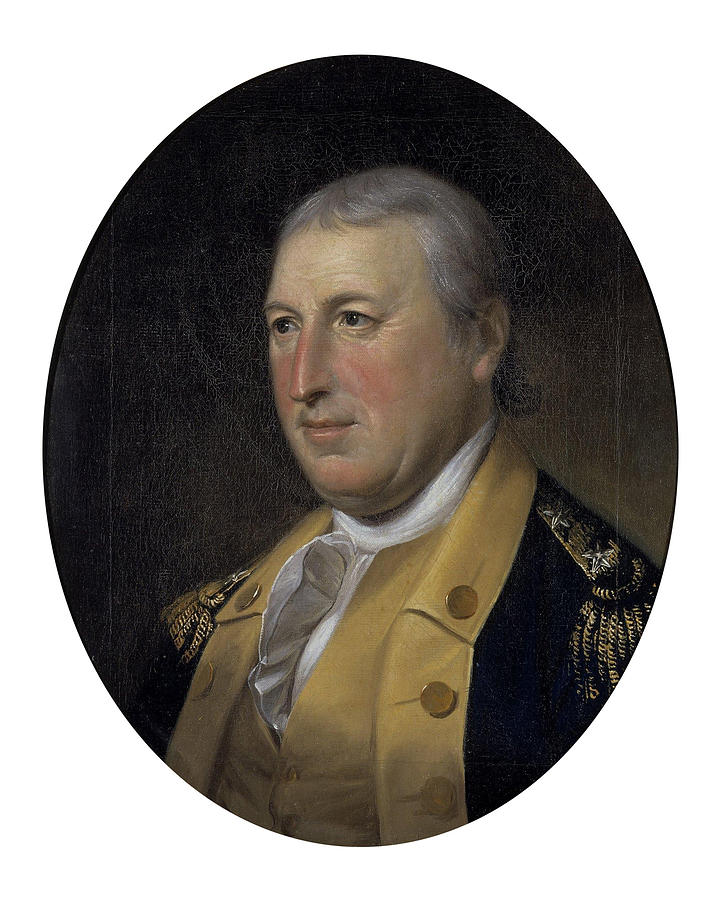
1782 portrait of Gates by Charles Willson Peale

In May 1780, news of the fall of Charleston, South Carolina, and the capture of General Benjamin Lincoln's southern army reached Congress. It voted to place Gates in command of the Southern Department. He learned of his new command at his home near Shepherdstown, Virginia (now West Virginia), and headed south to assume command of the remaining Continental forces near the Deep River in North Carolina on July 25, 1780.

Gates led Continental forces and militia south and prepared to face the British forces of Charles Cornwallis, who had advanced to Camden, South Carolina. In the Battle of Camden on August 16, Gates's army was routed, with nearly 1,000 men captured, along with the army's baggage train and artillery. Analysis of the debacle suggests that Gates greatly overestimated the capabilities of his inexperienced militia, an error magnified when he lined those forces against the British right, the traditional position of the strongest troops. He also failed to make proper arrangements for an organized retreat. Gates's principal accomplishment in the unsuccessful campaign was to cover 170 miles (270 km) in three days on horseback, heading north in retreat. His disappointment was compounded by news of his son Robert's death in combat in October. Nathanael Greene replaced Gates as commander on December 3, and Gates returned home to Virginia. Gates's devastating defeat at Camden not only ruined his new American army, but it also ruined his military reputation.

==== Board of inquiry ====
Because of the debacle at Camden, Congress passed a resolution calling for a board of inquiry, the prelude to a court-martial, to look into Gates's conduct. Always one to support a court-martial of other officers, particularly those with whom he competed for advancement, such as Benedict Arnold, Gates vehemently opposed the inquiry into his own conduct. Although he was never again placed in field command, Gates's New England supporters in Congress came to his aid in 1782, repealing the call for an inquiry. Gates then rejoined Washington's staff at Newburgh, New York. Rumors implicated some of his aides in the Newburgh Conspiracy of 1783. Gates may have agreed to involve himself, though this remains unclear.

== Later life and death ==
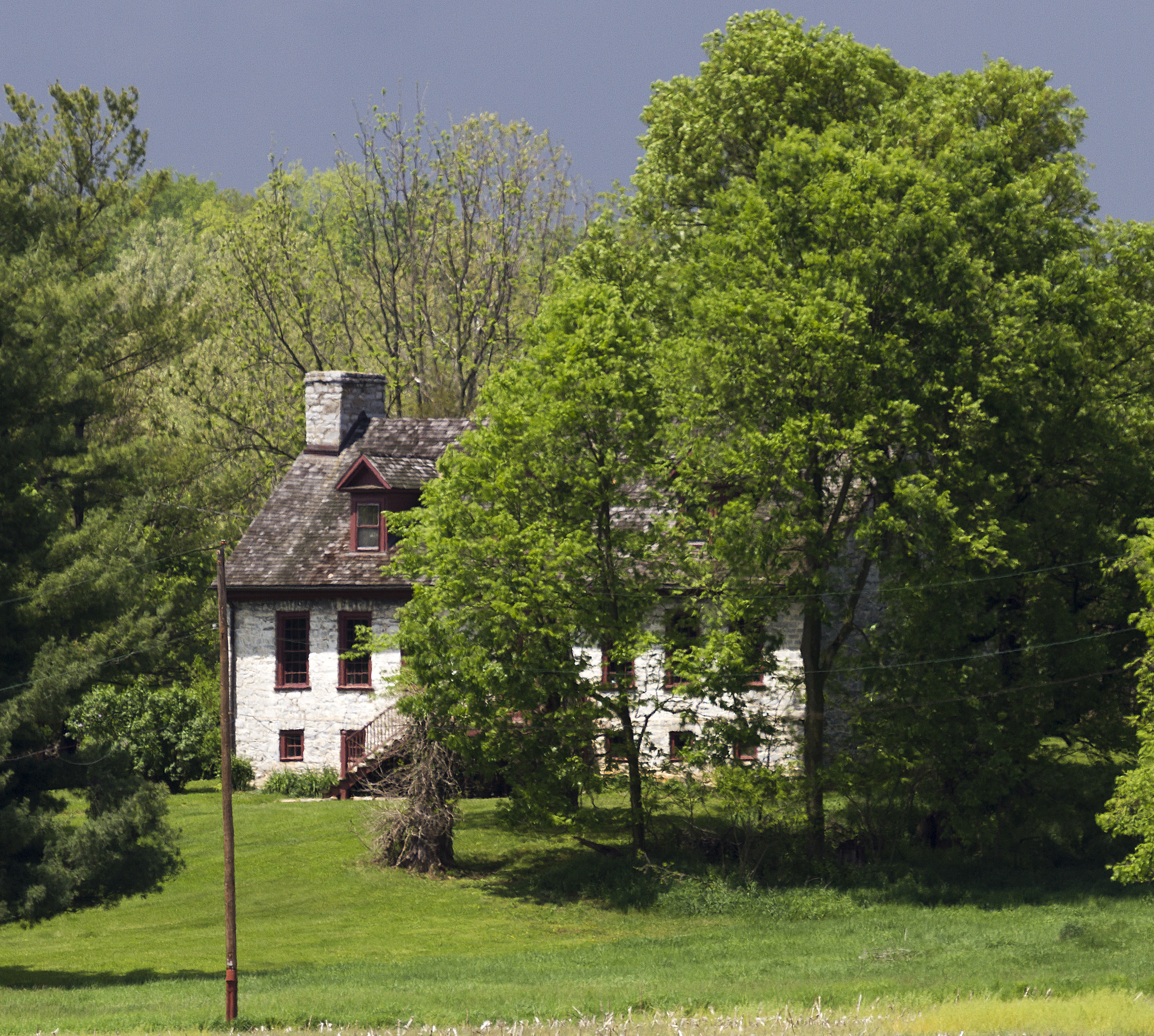
Traveller's Rest

Gates's wife Elizabeth died in the summer of 1783. He retired in 1784 and again returned to his estate Traveller's Rest in Virginia. He served as vice president of the Society of the Cincinnati, the organization of former Continental Army officers, and president of its Virginia chapter. He proposed marriage to Janet Montgomery, the widow of General Richard Montgomery, but she refused.

Gates married Mary Valens in 1786, a wealthy British woman from Liverpool who had moved from Britain to the Thirteen Colonies in 1773. The couple moved to an estate at Rose Hill, Manhattan, where the local authorities received him warmly.

Gates and his wife remained active in New York City society, and he was elected to a single term in the New York State Legislature in 1800. He died in his Rose Hill home on April 10, 1806, and was buried in the Trinity Church graveyard at the foot of Wall Street, though the exact location of his grave is unknown.

== Legacy ==
- The town of Gates in Monroe County, New York, is named in Gates's honor, as is Horatio Street in Manhattan's Greenwich Village, New York City, Gates Avenue, which runs from Ridgewood, Queens, to around Bedford-Stuyvesant, Brooklyn, Gates Avenue in Jersey City, Gates Place in The Bronx, NY and Gates County, North Carolina.
- The Gen. Horatio Gates House was his home during the Second Continental Congress at York, Pennsylvania.

Military offices
New title	Adjutant General of the Continental Army; June 17, 1775 – June 5, 1776	Succeeded by Joseph Reed
New title	President of the Board of War; November 24, 1777 – November 25, 1779	Succeeded by Benjamin Lincoln (as Secretary at War)
