= Stickney's Regiment of Militia =

- Active: 1777
- Allegiance: State of New Hampshire
- Type: Infantry
- Part of: New Hampshire Militia
- Engagements: Bennington

Commanders
- Notable commanders: Thomas Stickney

Stickney's Regiment of Militia, also known as the 11th New Hampshire Militia Regiment, was at Fort Ticonderoga during the spring of 1777 reinforcing the Continental Army garrison. The regiment was again called up on July 21, 1777, at Pembroke, New Hampshire for Gen. John Stark's Brigade gathering at Charlestown, New Hampshire during the Saratoga campaign. Part of Stickney's Regiment under Lt. Col. Nataniel Emerson was sent to Otter Creek on August 4 to clear out any remaining Loyalists. On August 16, 1777, Stickney's regiment, along with Hale's and Hobart's Regiment, made the main attack on Friedrich Baum's redoubt during the Battle of Bennington as Nichols' attacked from the rear (west) and Simonds' attacked from the south. Lt. Col. Emerson's detachment arrived along with Seth Warner's Green Mountain Boys in time to rout Heinrich von Breymann's reinforcements. Stickney's Regiment would continue on in Stark's Brigade to cut off British Gen. John Burgoyne from retreat or supply after the Battle of Freeman's Farm. The regiment would be disbanded on October 26, 1777, in northern New York.
