= Hale's Regiment of Militia =

- Active: 1776–1778
- Allegiance: State of New Hampshire
- Type: Infantry
- Part of: New Hampshire Militia
- Engagements: Bennington and Rhode Island

Commanders
- Notable commanders: Enoch Hale

Hale's Regiment of Militia also known as the 15th New Hampshire Militia Regiment was at Fort Ticonderoga during the spring and summer of 1776 reinforcing the Continental Army garrison. The regiment was again called up on July 21, 1777 at Rindge, New Hampshire for Gen. John Stark's Brigade gathering at Charlestown, New Hampshire during the Saratoga Campaign. On August 16, 1777 Hale's regiment along with Hobart's Regiment and Stickney's Regiment made the main attack on Friedrich Baum's redoubt during the Battle of Bennington as Nichols' attacked from the rear (west) and Simonds' attacked from the south. Hale's Regiment would continue on in Stark's Brigade to cut off British Gen. John Burgoyne from retreat or supply after the Battle of Freeman's Farm. The regiment was also part of Gen. John Sullivan's army at the unsuccessful Battle of Rhode Island in 1778.
