= Nichols' Regiment of Militia =

- Active: 1777–1780
- Allegiance: State of New Hampshire
- Type: Infantry
- Part of: New Hampshire Militia
- Engagements: Bennington and Rhode Island

Commanders
- Notable commanders: Moses Nichols

Nichols' Regiment of Militia also known as the 5th New Hampshire Militia Regiment was called up on July 21, 1777 at Winchester, New Hampshire, for Gen. John Stark's Brigade gathering at Charlestown, New Hampshire during the Saratoga Campaign. It was named for Dr Moses Nichols, who was appointed colonel of the regiment in 1776.

Nichols' Regiment moved to the rear of Friedrich Baum's redoubt and assaulted from behind (west) as Stickney's, Hale's and Hobart's assaulted from the front (east) and Simonds' attacked from the south during the Battle of Bennington. Nichols' Regiment would continue on in Stark's Brigade to cut off British Gen. John Burgoyne from retreat or supply after the Battle of Freeman's Farm. Nichols' Regiment would also take part in Gen. John Sullivan's campaign in Rhode Island in 1778. The regiment also served as part of the garrison of West Point during the year of 1780, during which time Benedict Arnold attempted to sell the post to the British.

== Sources ==
- Willey, George Franklyn (1903). State Builders: An Illustrated Historical and Biographical Record of the State of New Hampshire. State Builders Publishing Manchester, NH.
- Provincial and State Papers of New Hampshire
