= Moses Nichols =

American physician

Moses Nichols (June 28, 1740 – May 23, 1790) was an American physician, soldier, and leading citizen of Amherst, New Hampshire.

Nichols was born in Reading, Massachusetts, to Timothy Nichols and his wife Hannah Perkins. On July 7, 1761, Moses Nichols married Hannah Eaton of Lynn, Massachusetts.

He was appointed colonel of a regiment of New Hampshire Militia (5th NH Militia Regt.) in 1776. In 1777 he led them to the Battle of Bennington and in 1778 the Battle of Rhode Island. In 1780 he led his regiment to West Point where it formed part of the garrison. He attained the rank of Brigadier General.

Moses Nichols was often moderator at Amherst's town meetings and was five times a delegate to the Provincial Congress at Exeter, New Hampshire.
