= Hobart's Regiment of Militia =

- Active: 1777
- Allegiance: State of New Hampshire
- Type: Infantry
- Part of: New Hampshire Militia
- Engagements: Bennington

Commanders
- Notable commanders: David Hobart

Hobart's Regiment of Militia also known as the 12th New Hampshire Militia Regiment was called up on July 21, 1777 at Plymouth, New Hampshire for Gen. John Stark's Brigade gathering at Charlestown, New Hampshire during the Saratoga Campaign. Hobart's Regiment along with Hale's and Stickney's Regiment would assault Friedrich Baum's redoubt from the front (east) during the Battle of Bennington as Nichols' attacked from the rear (west) and Simonds' attacked from the south. Hobart's Regiment would continue on in Stark's Brigade to cut off British Gen. John Burgoyne from retreat or supply after the Battle of Freeman's Farm. The regiment would be disbanded on October 26, 1777 in northern New York.

== Sources ==
- The ranger service in the upper valley of the Connecticut, and the most northerly regiment of the New Hampshire militia in the period of the revolution : an address delivered before the New Hampshire Society of Sons of the American Revolution at Concord, N.H., April 26, 1900
