= Bennington Battle Day =

State holiday unique to Vermont

- Observed by: Vermont
- Significance: commemorating the victory at the Battle of Bennington in 1777
- Date: August 16
- Frequency: annual

Bennington Battle Day is a state holiday unique to Vermont, commemorating the victory of American and Vermont forces over British forces at the Battle of Bennington during the American Revolutionary War in 1777. The holiday's date is fixed, occurring on August 16 every year.

In Bennington, there is a battle re-enactment put on by the local history foundation.

The Battle of Bennington took place in New York, but is so named because the British were headed for a cache of weapons and munitions stored where the Bennington Battle Monument now stands in present-day Old Bennington, Vermont.
