= Northern theater of the American Revolutionary War =

The Northern Theater of the American Revolutionary War, also known as the Northern Department of the Continental Army, was a theater of operations during the American Revolutionary War.

It was originally called the New York Department, and consisted of all of New York State. On November 12, 1776, after the British occupation of New York City, the Highlands Department was created out of the Northern Department. The Northern Department then stopped 30 miles south of Albany. After that, it was always referred to as the Northern Department.

The Highlands Department was the smallest in area, and was formed around the defenses on the Hudson River north of New York City.

== Continental Northern Department ==
In 1777, the Northern Department was organised into:

- Commanding Officer of the Northern Department, General Philip Schuyler
- Nixon's Brigade, commanded by Brigadier General John Nixon
  - 4th (Massachusetts) Continental Regiment
  - 9th (Rhode Island) Continental Regiment
  - 11th (Rhode Island) Continental Regiment
  - 12th (Massachusetts) Continental Regiment
  - 2nd Rhode Island Militia
- De Fermoy's Brigade, commanded by French Brigadier General Matthias Alexis Roche de Fermoy
  - 1st (Pennsylvania) Continental Regiment
  - German Battalion (8th Maryland Regiment)
- Poor's Brigade, commanded by Brigadier General Enoch Poor
  - 2nd (New Hampshire) Continental Regiment
  - 5th (New Hampshire) Continental Regiment
  - 8th (New Hampshire) Continental Regiment
  - 3rd New York Regiment
  - 4th New York Regiment
- Paterson's Brigade, commanded by Brigadier General John Paterson
  - 10th Massachusetts Regiment
  - 11th Massachusetts Regiment
  - 18th (Massachusetts) Continental Regiment
  - 14th Massachusetts Regiment
- Learned's Brigade, commanded by Brigadier General Ebenezer Learned
  - 16th (Massachusetts) Continental Regiment
  - 23rd (Massachusetts) Continental Regiment
  - 26th (Massachusetts) Continental Regiment

== British Northern Army ==
During the Battles of Saratoga, the British northern army consisted of:

- Commanding Officer, Lieutenant General John Burgoyne
- Commander of Artillery & Engineers, Major G. Williams
  - detachments of artillery forming 4 composite Companies from the 4th Battalion, Royal Artillery
  - Artilleriekompagnie von Pausch (Hesse-Hanau)
  - (Captured during the Capture of Fort Ticonderoga) No.6 Company, 4th Battalion, Royal Artillery
- Advanced Corps (vanguard), commanded by Brigadier General S. Fraser
  - 24th Regiment of Foot
  - Canadian Provincial Troops (2 coys)
  - Indians led by Chief Joseph Brant
- Right Division, commanded by Major General William Phillips
  - 1st Brigade, commanded by Brigadier General James Inglis Hamilton
    - 20th Regiment of Foot
    - 21st Regiment of Foot
    - 62nd Regiment of Foot
  - 2nd Brigade, commanded by Brigadier General Henry Watson Powell
    - 9th Regiment of Foot
    - 47th Regiment of Foot
    - 53rd Regiment of Foot
- Left Division (all Germans), commanded by Generalmajor (Major General) Baron Friedrich Adolf Riedesel Freiherr zu Eisenbach (Brunswicker)
  - 1st (Brunswick) Brigade, commanded by Brigadegeneral Johann Friedrich von Specht
    - Musketeerregiment von Rhetz (Brunswick)
    - Musketeerregiment von Specht (Brunswick)
    - Musketeerregiment von Riedesel (Brunswick)
  - 2nd Brigade, commanded by Brigadegeneral Wilhelm von Gall (Hesse-Hanau)
    - Musketeerregiment von Prinz Fiederich (Brunswick)
    - Musketeerregiment von Erbprinz (Hesse-Hanau)
- Reserve (Germans), commanded by Oberstleutnant Heinrich von Breymann
  - Brunswickdragoonregiment von Ludwig
  - Grenadierbataillon von Breymann (Brunswick)
  - Füsilierbataillon von Barner (Brunswick)
  - Jägerbataillon von Schottelius

== Campaigns ==
On May 10, 1775, Fort Ticonderoga was captured from the British.

Major General Philip Schuyler was appointed department commander on June 25, 1775. On June 28, 1775 the New York Provincial Congress authorized the raising of the four regiments of the New York Line.

The major campaigns are divided as follows:

- New York and New Jersey campaign
- Saratoga campaign
- Northern theater of the American Revolutionary War after Saratoga

== After War years ==
This department was the only one to remain after the war. The last elements of the Continental Army were kept to guard the western frontier outposts.

== See also ==
- List of American Revolutionary War battles
- Departments of the Continental Army
