= Simonds' Regiment of Militia =

- Active: 1776–1780
- Allegiance: State of Massachusetts
- Type: Infantry
- Part of: Massachusetts militia
- Engagements: Bennington

Commanders
- Notable commanders: Benjamin Simonds

Simonds' Regiment of Militia also known as the 2nd Berkshire County Regiment was raised in Berkshire County, Massachusetts during the American Revolutionary War. The Regiment was at Fort Ticonderoga during the winter of 1776–1777. Simonds' Regiment was called up in the summer of 1777 during the Saratoga Campaign fighting at the Battle of Bennington with General John Stark's Brigade of New Hampshire Militia. Many volunteers also joined the regiment at this time including William Easton, and the "Fighting Parson," Thomas Allen. Simonds' Regiment attacked Friedrich Baum's redoubt from the south during the battle as Stickney's, Hale's and Hobart's attacked form the east and Nichols' attacked from the west. The regiment would continue on to the Battle of Bemis Heights and the surrender of British General John Burgoyne's army. The regiment would also be called up in response to Carleton's Raid and the Royalton Raid of 1780.

Officers commissioned for the 2nd Berkshire County Regiment of Massachusetts Militia, 30 August 1775:

- Benjamin Simonds, Colonel
- Jonathan Smith, Lieutenant Colonel
- David Rosseter, 1st Major
- Caleb Hyde, 2nd Major

On 22 January 1776, an act was passed for "Forming and Regulating the Militia within the Colony of the Massachusetts Bay, in New England, etc." and repealing all former acts for that purpose. In accordance with this act, John Hancock, Azor Orne, and Benjamin Lincoln were chosen 1st, 2nd and 3rd Major Generals of the militia of the colony, dated 8 February 1776. Brigadiers for the various counties were chosen and the number of regiments was set for each county with 2 for Berkshire County. John Fellows was chosen Brigadier General for Berkshire County, 30 January 1776, the appointment concurred in by Council, 8 February 1776.

According to an official record of a ballot of the Massachusetts House of Representative dated 30 January 1776, officers were again chosen for the 2nd Berkshire County Regiment of Massachusetts Militia with the appointments being concurred in by Council, 7 February 1776:

- Benjamin Simonds, Colonel
- Jonathan Smith, Lieutenant Colonel
- David Rosseter, 1st Major
- Caleb Hyde, 2nd Major

List of Officers commissioned or chosen for the 2nd Berkshire County Regiment, May–June 1776:

- Eliel Tode (Todd), Adjutant
- Peter Porter, Captain, 5th (Becket) Company
- Amos Rathbone, Captain, 6th Company
- Oliver Belding, Captain, 7th Company
- William Clark, Captain, 8th (Gageborough) Company
- William Francis, Captain, 9th (2nd Pittsfield) Company
- William Watkins, Captain, 16th (Partridgefield) Company
- Gideon Hinman, Captain, 21st (3rd Lanesborough) Company
- Gideon Kent, Captain, 22nd (New Ashford) Company
- Zebulon Norton, Captain 23rd (Dalton) Company
- William Green, 1st Lieutenant, Capt. Gideon Kent's 22nd Company
- Samuel Goodrich, 2nd Lieutenant, Capt. Oliver Belding's 7th Company
- William Ford, 2nd Lieutenant, Capt. William Francis's 9th Company
- Daniel Brown, 2nd Lieutenant, Capt. Gideon Hinman's 21 Company
