= Frederika Charlotte Riedesel =

German writer (1746–1808)

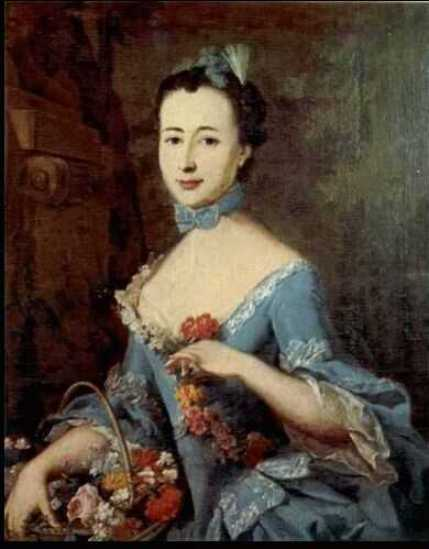
- Born: Friederike Charlotte Louise von Massow; 11 July 1746; Brandenburg-an-der-Havel
- Died: 29 March 1808 (aged 61); Berlin
- Resting place: Lauterbach
- Occupation: Author
- Spouse: Friedrich Adolf Riedesel (m. 1762; died 1800)
- Children: 9
- Writing career
- Period: Early modern
- Genres: Journals

Signature
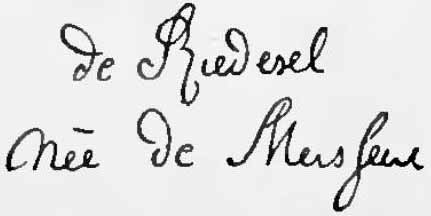

The Baroness Friederike Charlotte Louise Riedesel zu Eisenbach (née von Massow; 11 July 1746 – 29 March 1808) was a German writer and the wife of Brunswick–Luneburg general Friedrich Adolf Riedesel. She kept a journal of her experiences as a spouse attached to the so-called Hessian forces during the American War of Independence.

== Early life ==
Charlotte was born on 11 July 1746 in Brandenburg-an-der-Havel. In the histories sponsored by the Riedesel family, she is referred to as Charlotte. It was common for Germans at the time to be called by one of their middle names.

Her father, Valentin von Massow, was a Prussian official, but had been a lieutenant general in the Prussian army. She had travelled with the Prussian army as a child, and learned the hard life of a camp follower.

In 1762, Charlotte helped care for Lieutenant Colonel Riedesel, who had been wounded in battle during the Seven Years' War. They were married that same year; Charlotte was sixteen years old.

Friedrich Adolph Riedesel was a member of the line of Riedesel zu Eisenbach, and like all his male cousins had the title of Freiherr or Baron. He was not "the Baron" or "von Riedesel." Upon their marriage Charlotte gained the title of Freifrau or Baroness Riedesel zu Eisenbach. She was described as looking more like an unmarried school girl than a married woman. She would grow into a red-haired baroness, "full in figure and possessing no small share of beauty." In the following years, the Riedesels had two daughters, Gustava and Frederica, and Charlotte was pregnant with a third, Carolina, in 1776 when Brunswick–Luneburg signed a treaty to support Great Britain in the suppression of the rebellion in their American colonies. Friedrich was appointed commander of Brunswick–Luneburg troops, and he referred to Charlotte as "Mrs. General".

General Riedesel sailed for the Americas in 1776, with the understanding that Charlotte would join him as soon as the new baby could travel. Carolina was born in March, and the family sailed to England in May. Charlotte took with her some antiques to sell in England, where the demand for such items would provide them with needed money for their travelling expenses.

"Mrs. General" Riedesel was well received in England in court, but she and her daughters suffered abuse in public, on account of her fashions being mistaken for French. Charlotte awaited her ship to Canada in Bristol, where she is said to have learned the English language and customs within six weeks. General Riedesel insisted she travel with a companion, however, and she could not set sail for Canada until April 1777.

== American War of Independence ==
Charlotte arrived in Canada and was reunited with Friedrich in June at Trois-Rivières. She received permission to accompany the army South, on General John Burgoyne's campaign to capture Albany. Her journals reveal her military background, and she was critical of the lack of security at camp.

Charlotte and her daughters followed the army in a calash. She was with the army on 19 September and was an eye-witness to the Battle of Freeman's Farm. Her journals describe her evening in a nearby house, where wounded soldiers came to rest, and where a young English officer slowly died during the night.

Baroness Riedesel was preparing a meal on 7 October when the Battle of Bemis Heights began. The table, with its meal, was cleared to make a bed for General Simon Fraser. Charlotte spent the night tending to wounded soldiers, other women, and her own children. General Fraser died the next morning, and that afternoon, the house caught fire, and the Riedesel family was forced to evacuate. General Fraser had requested that his body be buried at a redoubt, and Frederika observed the funeral under American cannon fire.

Immediately thereafter, the British, fearing imminent defeat at the hands of the Americans, determined upon retreat to Canada. "Mrs. General" Riedesel was very critical of General Burgoyne, and broke with 18th-century customs to remind the General that his men were starving.

After marching north through torrential rains with their equipment mired in mud the Baroness took refuge near Saratoga, present day Schuylerville, in what is now known as the Marshall House, a large wooden structure where yet is preserved the stone cellar where Charlotte sheltered with her small children, women accompanying the army and wounded officers and men.

Elsewhere in the house remain beams shattered by American cannon fire and bloodstains in the floor left by "one poor soldier", in the words of the Baroness, whose leg was struck off in the cannonade. Three of eleven cannonballs recorded by Charlotte as having hit the building are displayed. She spent days managing a crowded cellar which became a shelter for women and wounded soldiers as the battle continued. A German soldier described her as an "angel of comfort" who "restored order in the chaos."

The heroic and tragic events that took place in the Marshall House are vividly described in Baroness Riedesel's celebrated diary. The Marshall House was placed upon the National Register of Historic Places in 2002. Erected in 1770 it is the sole remaining structure in the area predating the Battles of Saratoga. It remains today a private home.

Following the British surrender on 17 October, Charlotte and her daughters became the guests of General Philip Schuyler. The Riedesel family traveled with the defeated army to Boston, where they were to sail back to Europe. The terms of surrender were rejected by Congress, however, and the prisoners spent the next four years as the Convention Army.

The Convention Army was moved from Boston to Virginia in 1779. Here, General Riedesel collapsed while working in the garden, and Baroness Riedesel spent her time as his nurse. Until he returned to Germany, General Riedesel could not sleep unless Charlotte was with him.

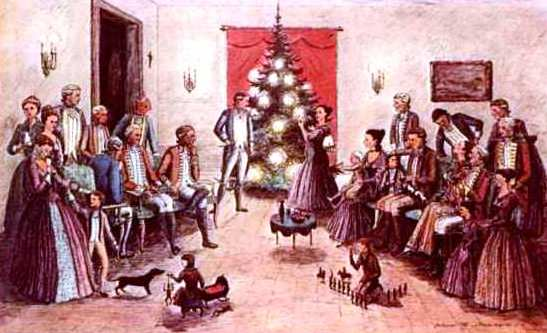
General and Baroness Riedesel celebrated Christmas 1781 in Canada, and are credited with popularizing the German traditional Christmas tree in the Americas.

In late 1779, the Riedesels were allowed to move to New York City. While residing there in 1780, Charlotte gave birth to their fourth daughter, whom they named America. That same year, a smallpox epidemic broke out, and Charlotte again became the nurse to her household, perhaps even saving the life of her husband, who had asked to die.

Finally, in July 1781, the Riedesel family was permitted to leave New York, and travelled to Canada. Here, Charlotte gave birth to a fifth daughter, named Canada, who did not survive. Before departing Canada, General Riedesel took his wife to review the English soldiers who were under his command. The English greeted Charlotte with military honors. The Riedesels left for Germany in 1783. Charlotte is credited with saving the Braunschweig regimental colors by hiding them in her mattress, and she returned them to Duke Karl Wilhelm Ferdinand.

== Family ==
The Riedesels had four more children - nine total - of whom six survived past their first year. After a further campaign in the Netherlands from 1788 to 1793, General Riedesel died in 1800. Charlotte returned to Berlin and published her journals from the war that same year. Her book became an important first-hand account of the Saratoga Campaign. Baroness Riedesel died 29 March 1808 in Berlin.
