= Marshall House (Schuylerville, New York) =

Historic house in New York, United States

- U.S. National Register of Historic Places
- Location within New York Location within the United States
- Nearest city: Schuylerville, New York
- Coordinates: 43°6′40″N 73°34′50″W
- Area: (2002) 3.6 acres (1.5 ha) (2010) 7.6 acres (3.1 ha)
- Built: 1770
- Architectural style: Colonial, Italianate
- NRHP reference No.: 02000878
- Added to NRHP: August 22, 2002

The Marshall House is a house in Schuylerville, New York listed on the National Register of Historic Places for both its place in American history and its architectural significance.

== Pre-Revolutionary history ==
The Marshall House is listed on the National Register of Historical Places for both its place in American history and its architectural significance. Constructed in 1770–1773 as a gambrel-roofed, heavy timbered farmhouse and remodeled in 1867–1868 in the Italianate Style, the Marshall House retains substantial integrity of design and materials. Despite its modifications, the building remains understandable as a rare, extant example of pre-Revolutionary residential architecture. It is one of only two extant “witness” buildings associated with the pivotal Revolutionary Battles of Saratoga that took place in 1777.

Pressed into service as a British field hospital, the building became the refuge of the Baroness Frederika Riedesel, whose well known diary chronicles the tribulations, deaths and heroism of other noncombatants, wounded officers, and men who sheltered with her through a six-day artillery bombardment and siege.

The pre-Revolutionary history of the property referred to as the Marshall House is incomplete. The building was erected “on lot number one of the tenth allotment in the general division of the Kayderosseras patent, bounded on the south by the north line of the Saratoga patent, containing about forty acres (16 ha)”. The property now comprises 7.6 acres (3.1 ha).

The area, originally called Saratoga, was inhabited by Dutch and English settlers beginning in 1684 who came to advantage themselves of the plentiful water power afforded by the confluence of the Hudson River, the Fish Creek, and the Batten Kill at this point, in addition to being aided by rich soils. There are some indications that the subject house and its surrounding farm served as a collection point for timber and local produce for shipping down river to Albany, to be sold there by the three-man partnership that built it.

Known with certainty is that the property soon came into the hands of Peter Lansing, an Albany merchant, whose family were prominent land owners and fellow merchants in the upper Hudson Valley. However, local nineteenth-century accounts hold that the Lansings and others fled south upon the approach of the British army and its Indian allies in the summer of 1777.

== The Battles of Saratoga and the Baroness Frederika Riedesel ==
The Marshall House attained its fame for the role it played in the events leading to the British surrender following the Battles of Saratoga fought during September–October, 1777. Traveling with the British army was the Baroness Frederika Riedesel, the young wife of Major General Friedrich Adolf Riedesel, commander of the German soldiers who formed part of the British army under Lieutenant General John Burgoyne. During the afternoon of October 10 American batteries emplaced on the east side of the Hudson River opened fire on Riedesel's defenses some fifty rods south of the Marshall House. The baron, seeing the house, urged his wife and their three young children to seek safety in its stone cellar. Baroness Riedesell was soon joined by other women in like circumstances as well as by wounded military personnel.

Observing the commotion surrounding the house the Americans mistakenly supposed it to be an enemy headquarters and began firing upon it. As aforesaid, the baroness recounted in her diary the ordeal of those besieged in the house:

“We were at last obliged to resort to the cellar for refuge, and in one corner of this I remained the whole day, my children sleeping on the earth with their heads in my lap; and in the same situation I passed a sleepless night. Eleven [cannonballs] passed through the house, and we could distinctly hear them roll away. One poor soldier who was lying on a table for the purpose of having his leg amputated, was struck by a shot, which carried away his other; his comrades had left him, and when we went to his assistance we found him in a corner of the room, into which he had crept, more dead than alive, scarcely breathing”.

The bombardment resumed the following morning. As their danger continued, the refugees and wounded suffered for want of water, the well having gone dry:

”At length we found a soldier's wife who had courage enough to fetch us some from the river, an office nobody else would undertake, as the Americans shot at every person who approached it; but, out of respect for her sex, they never molested her”.

The Baroness Riedesel organized the female refugees (the wives of several British officers) to attend the wounded as best they were able. For her tireless efforts throughout the six day siege the baroness won the affection of all who shared her fate in the Marshall House. On October 16, with British surrender imminent, the noncombatants at last were free to emerge in safety. The following day, October 17, 1777, Burgoyne surrendered to the Americans. As a result of the American victory at Saratoga (present day Schuylerville) the French government threw its support to the American cause assuring success in the War of Independence.

== The Marshall House after the American Revolutionary War ==
Following the Revolution the Marshall House property changed hands. Captain Samuel Bushee, a war veteran and settler from Connecticut, purchased it from Peter Lansing in 1802. Bushee subsequently conveyed the property to his father-in-law, Abraham Marshall, in 1817. Thereafter the property remained in the Marshall family until 1930 when it was purchased by Kenneth and Adelaide Bullard whose descendants remain its owners and inhabitants.

After the war, the house was recognized for its role in the Battles of Saratoga. Though always a private residence the Marshall House has ever been a destination for persons touring the Saratoga battlefields. Exhibits include Cannonballs that struck the house, the floorboards of makeshift hospital rooms, and the capacious stone cellar. Original preserved items that are in use from the time of the Battles of Saratoga are the hinges, and the great lock on the front door, the thumb latch and the wooden door in the cellarway.

== Architectural significance ==
The Marshall house is found a mile north of the center of Schuylerville, Town of Saratoga, Saratoga County, New York, It is approached by means of a long, curved and sloping driveway atop a steep rise nineteen rods west of New York highway 32. The site features mature white pine, towering black locust and spruce trees upon a broad lawn. The Hudson River below flows north to south.

In its present configuration the Marshall House is a two-story, single-sloped-roof building, five bays long by three bays wide, oriented with its principal elevation facing east. The original form of the house was as constructed c. 1770 a 1 1/2-story, heavy timbered post-and-beam, gambrel-roofed main block with a recessed, gable-roofed kitchen wing attached to the southwest corner. The entire structure rests upon a fieldstone foundation enclosing a full basement.

Until the renovations of the mid-nineteenth century the main block incorporated interior end chimneys; a single chimney for a cooking hearth appears in old pictures showing the small kitchen wing. The original five-bay center-hall plan of the colonial farmhouse was retained when the full second story was added at the time of the Italianate remodeling of 1867–68. The lighter timbers used for the second story improvement were recycled from another building. Simultaneously the original kitchen wing was razed and a new, larger kitchen added at the rear.

The building was partially nogged with ballast brick, particularly beneath window openings, sheathed with 1-inch (25 mm) by 10-inch (250 mm) rough pine boards covered by narrow clapboard siding. An L-shaped narrow wrap-around porch featuring a series of decorative arches was added to the first story, primarily oriented eastwards. The original small windows on the east elevation were lengthened floor-to-ceiling and triple-hung (now double-hung). The wide entrance architrave of the original house was retained. The present divided “Dutch” door of the 1930s restoration features the original forged iron hardware and massive lock and key hardware from the first construction.

The interior, too, retains many features of the original construction as well as elements reflecting improvements undertaken in the 1840s, 1867–68 and 1931. The center hall contains a staircase with a landing slightly below the second floor; the balustrade and oaken newel remain from the post-civil war remodeling. The library and parlor rooms flank the center hall and a dining room faces south. A “modern” nineteenth century kitchen and two small utility rooms are located in the west wing above a crawl space containing a disused cistern.

Above it are two simple bedrooms, probably occupied by servants or farmhands in earlier times. Fireplace hearths were rebuilt in 1931, but with exterior chimneys, upon the footprint of the originals. The mantel in the north (library) room is simple and reflective of Italianate styling. The mantel in the south (parlor) room exhibits dentelle and intricate carving and is believed to be original to the house. The floors downstairs and upstairs are wide native white pine boards secured to the heavy adz-hewn joists below with 4-inch (100 mm) hand-cut iron nails.

== The Apple Cottage ==
Behind and west of the building that is the chief subject of this article stands a small lodge erected in 1957 called the Apple Cottage (Ringo-an in Japanese). It is remarkable in that it is entirely built using local materials together with orientalia. The roof is Granville slate, its siding is Adirondack white pine board-and-batten, its entry steps are taken from a nearby old Champlain Canal commutation bridge abutment, and its wooden window sash were made locally. Within, the ground floor is paved with Granville flagstones, the second floor with box car siding. Throughout, the interior walls are unstained white pine darkened by the passage of time.

An upstairs passageway is walled with Japanese cedar bark. The ceiling in the main room is finished with woven bamboo(sawali) from the Philippine Islands, supported by cherry false rafters. There are fireplaces on each of the two floors built of local “ruckytuck” sandstone. The mantel shelf downstairs is fashioned from white oak; the mantel upstairs of red mahogany from Thailand. The balustrade is composed of cedar poles and mulberry boards. The bedroom ceiling is covered with Korean grass paper. The oriental features recall the present owner's life in the Far East where he for some years represented an American manufacturer.

The ground floor houses a kitchen and dining area. From it is accessed a screened porch fronted by a wildflower garden. The second floor features a bright room furnished with a grand piano and music library, at present the studio of Hilary Tann, the well known Welsh-American composer of modern classical music. At the north end is a small bedroom. The east elevation commands a view of the Hudson River and the Green Mountains of Vermont; the west elevation stands above a pond populated by koi (Japanese carp). The north elevation overlooks a Japanese garden with an imaginary pond and tori (stone lantern). To the south there is a lawn where stand a large sycamore, spruce, oak, white cedar and several species of pine trees.

== Bibliography ==
- Pictorial Field-Book of the Revolution, I, by Benson J. Lossing, 1850.
- Stone, William L., translator. Letters and Journals relating to the War of the American Revolution, and the Capture of the German Troops at Saratoga, by Mrs. General Riedesel. Joel Munsell, Albany, N. Y., 1867.
- Old Saratoga and The Burgoyne Campaign, by William S. Ostrander, Schuylerville, N. Y., 1897.
- The Baroness and the General, by Louise Hall Tharp, Little, Brown and Company, Boston/Toronto, 1962.
- Baroness von Riedesel and the American Revolution, Marvin L. Brown, JR., The University of North Carolina Press, Chapel Hill, 1965.
