= Friedrich Baum =

German army officer

- Born: 1727
- Died: 18 August 1777 (aged 50); Walloomsac, New York, U.S.
- Burial place: Bennington County, Vermont, U.S.
- Military career
- Allegiance: Duke of Brunswick-Wolfenbüttel
- Rank: Lieutenant Colonel
- Commands: Dragoon Regiment "Prinz Ludwig"
- Battles: Seven Years' War; American Revolutionary War; Battle of Bennington (DOW)

Friedrich Baum (1727 – 18 August 1777) was a senior officer of Brunswick-Wolfenbüttel troops who commanded dragoons in the Northern Theater of the American War of Independence. Baum was mortally wounded at the Battle of Bennington.

== American War of Independence ==
Baum served under another German officer, Major General Friedrich Adolf Riedesel, commanding the Dragoon Regiment "Prinz Ludwig" of the Braunschweiger Jäger (lit. 'Brunswick Hunters') in support of General John Burgoyne's 1777 campaign to attack the Lake Champlain-Hudson River corridor, which ended in Burgoyne's surrender at Saratoga, New York on October 15, 1777.

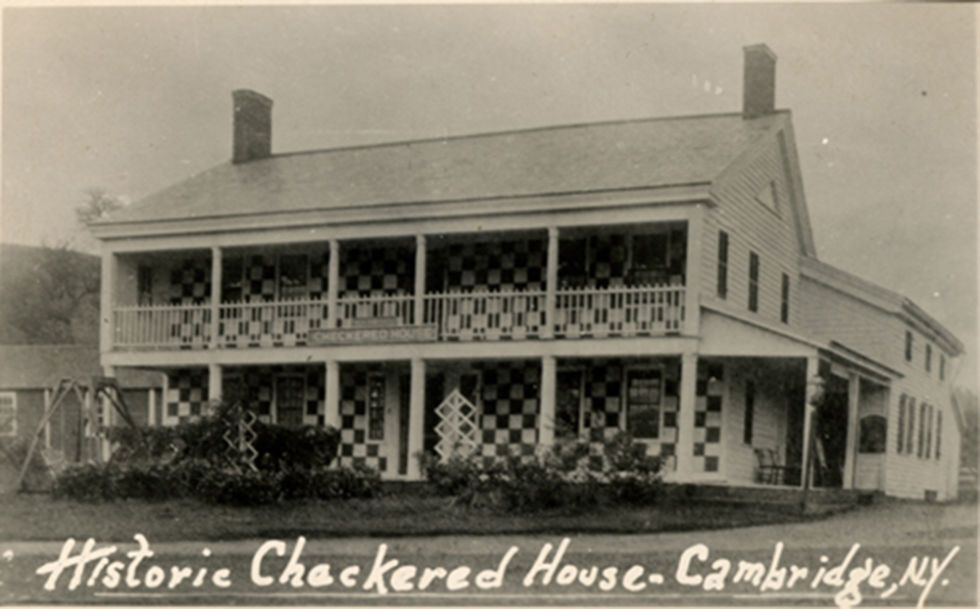
Baum's headquarters during the 1777 battle of Bennington

For Baum, the campaign ended at the Battle of Bennington, on August 16, 1777. Arriving in Canada with the Brunswick army in the winter of 1776, Burgoyne detailed Baum with around 600 Brunswickers, British, and Indians from Fort Edward to try to collect provisions, horses, and Loyalist reinforcements for Burgoyne's main force for the march south toward Albany. However, nearly 2,000 rebels, consisting of New Hampshire forces under John Stark and the remnants of Seth Warner's Green Mountain Boys following the costly Battle of Hubbardton, were arrayed against Baum's men. Also among Stark's forces were Massachusetts men under Reverend Thomas Allen, leading a contingent of Pittsfield militia. Allen, who had been outraged at the abandonment of Fort Ticonderoga to Burgoyne at the beginning of July, complained to Stark that if his men did not get to fight at Bennington they would never answer another call to arms.

Although Baum had served in several engagements in Europe during the Seven Years' War, he had little battlefield command experience. In contrast, his adversary Stark had served with Robert Rogers' Rangers, including the Battle of Ticonderoga; and he had distinguished himself as an American leader at Bunker Hill, Trenton, and Princeton.

Baum's lack of experience showed at Bennington, where he encamped his forces in such a way that they were separated and unable to communicate easily with each other. Communications were also hampered in some degree by the inability of Baum, who spoke only German, to speak English.

Baum had been assigned a loyalist from the nearby region to guide his forces and attest to the character of any indigenous people encountered along the way. According to a field report that was later published in the London Gazette by Burgoyne himself:

Lieutenant-Colonel Baum . . . was joined at a Place called Santcoick Mills . . . by many People professing
themselves to be Loyalists. A Provincial Gentleman of Confidence, who had been sent with the
Detachment, as knowing the Country, and the Characters of Inhabitants, was so incautious as to
[naively accept their] Oath of Allegiance. His Credulity and their Profligacy caused the first
Misfortune, Colonel Baum was . . . betrayed; the Men who had taken the Oaths were the first to fire upon
him; he was attacked on all Sides; he showed [sic] great Personal Courage, but was overpowered by
Numbers.

Putting his superior numbers to best use, Stark surrounded each of Baum's forces and attacked simultaneously, overwhelming each redoubt. In the melée, Baum was captured after sustaining a mortal stomach wound, from which his surgeon, Julius Friedrich Wasmus, also captured, was unable to save him.

Seeing he was badly outnumbered, Baum had requested reinforcements from Burgoyne, who sent Lieutenant Colonel Heinrich von Breymann and a corps of light infantrymen and Brunswick grenadiers to support him. However, Breymann, who disliked Baum, marched slowly to the site, making less than one mile per hour, arriving after Baum had already been overrun and captured.

== Honours ==
Colonel Baum Road, which runs through the Washington County, New York town of Easton, just south of the Village of Greenwich, is named for him.
