= Battle of Bennington =

1777 battle of the American Revolutionary War

- Part of the Saratoga campaign
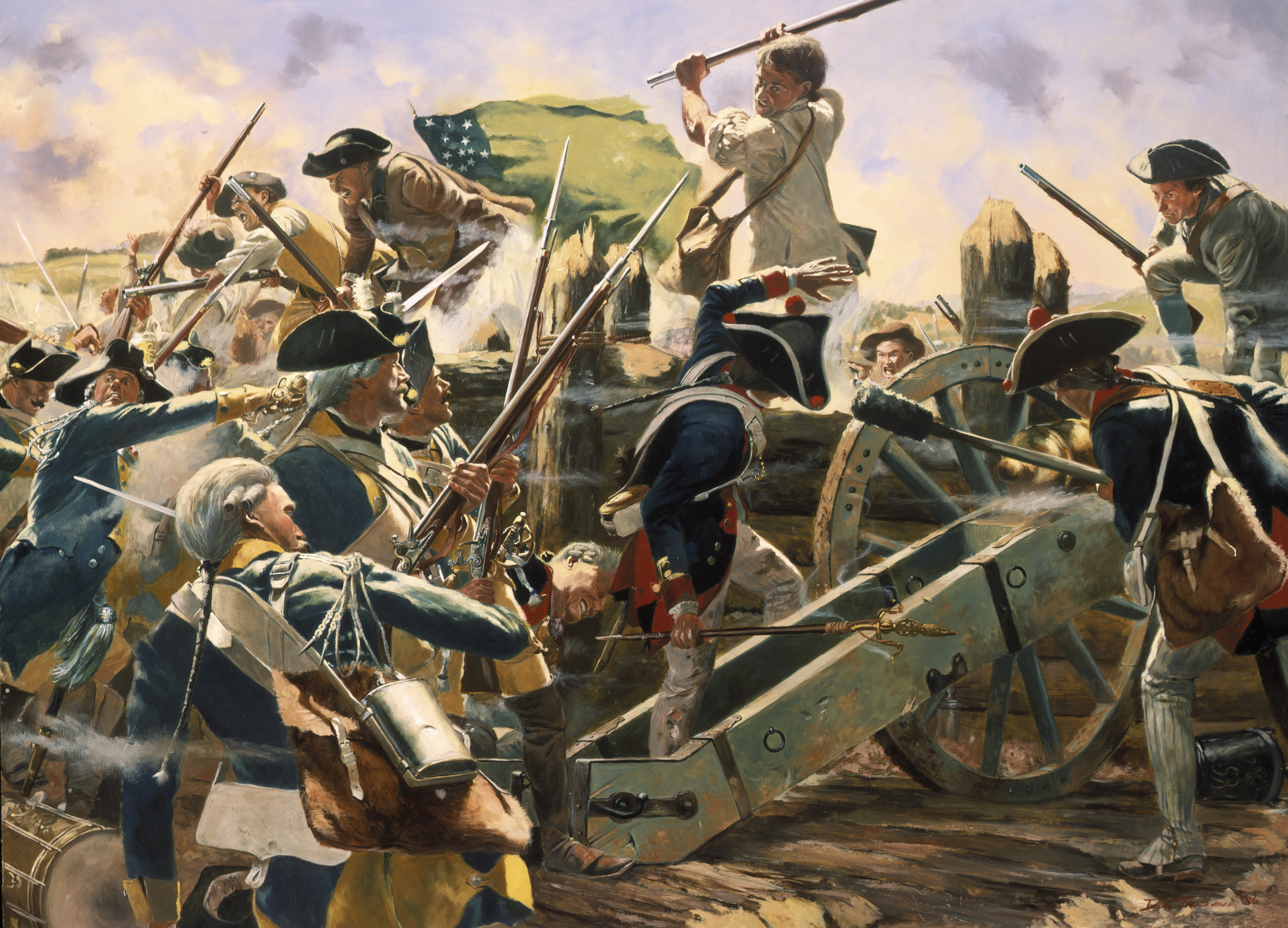
- 2004 painting of the battle
Date	August 16, 1777
Location	Walloomsac, New York 42°56′19″N 73°18′16″W
Result	American victory

Belligerents
United States; Vermont Republic	Brunswick-Wolfenbüttel; Hesse-Hanau; Brunswick–Lüneburg; Great Britain; Haudenosaunee

Commanders and leaders
John Stark; Seth Warner	Friedrich Baum †; Heinrich von Breymann

Strength
2,000–2,500 (Stark); 350 (Warner)	800 (Baum); 550–650 (Breymann)

Casualties and losses
30 killed; 40 wounded	207 killed; 700 captured
- Location within New York Battle of Bennington (the United States)

The Battle of Bennington was fought on August 16, 1777, in Walloomsac, New York during the Saratoga campaign of the American Revolutionary War. Taking place approximately 10 miles (16 km) from its namesake, Bennington, Vermont, the battle was fought between an American force of 2,000–2,500 men under Brigadier General John Stark and Lieutenant Colonel Seth Warner and a mostly Hessian and Loyalist force of 1,350–1,450 men under Lieutenant-colonel Friedrich Baum and Lieutenant-colonel Heinrich von Breymann. Stark and Warner's army defeated Baum and von Breymann's force, inflicting almost 1,000 casualties while suffering fewer than 100.

Prior to the battle, Baum had been detached from a British-led army under Lieutenant-general John Burgoyne and sent with approximately 700 men to engage in a foraging and raiding expedition to Bennington on July 22. Baum's force consisted of a mixture of Hessian, Loyalist, and British regulars along with Loyalist and French-Canadian irregulars and Haudenosaunee warriors. Both Burgoyne and Baum incorrectly believed that Bennington was lightly defended and were unaware that 1,500 American militiamen under Stark were stationed there. In the days before the battle Stark's force was reinforced by a further 1,000 militia while Baum's force was likewise reinforced by 100 Loyalist irregulars.

Following a rain-caused standoff Stark's men, comprising New Hampshire and Massachusetts militia along with Vermont Republic militiamen under Warner, enveloped Baum's position on August 16 and overran it, killing Baum along with many of his men and capturing hundreds. A force of 550–650 Hessians under von Breymann arrived to reinforce Baum as the Americans were mopping up, and the battle restarted. Von Breymann's troops immediately attacked and drove back Stark's men. However, Warner's troops arrived to reinforce Stark's and the combined American force drove away von Breymann and his troops with heavy casualties.

The battle was a major strategic success for the Americans and is considered one of the turning points of the war; it reduced Burgoyne's army in size by almost 1,000 men, led his Indians allies to largely abandon him, and deprived Burgoyne of much-needed supplies, such as mounts for his cavalry regiments, draft animals and provisions, all of which contributed to Burgoyne's eventual defeat at Saratoga. The victory galvanized support for the Patriot cause, and played a key role in bringing France into the war on the American side. The battle's anniversary is celebrated in the state of Vermont as Bennington Battle Day.

== Background ==
With the American Revolutionary War two years old, the British changed their plans. Giving up on the rebellious New England Colonies, they decided to split the Thirteen Colonies and isolate New England from what the British believed to be the more loyal Southern Colonies. The British command devised a grand plan to divide the colonies via a three-way pincer movement towards Albany. The western pincer, proceeding eastward from Lake Ontario under the command of Barry St. Leger, was repulsed when the Siege of Fort Stanwix failed, and the southern pincer, which was to progress up the Hudson valley from New York City, never started since General William Howe decided instead to capture Philadelphia.

The northern pincer, proceeding southward from Montreal, enjoyed the most success. After British victories at Fort Ticonderoga, Hubbardton, and Fort Anne, General John Burgoyne proceeded with the Saratoga campaign, with the goal of capturing Albany, New York and gaining control of the Hudson River valley, where Burgoyne's force could (as the plan went) meet the other pincers, dividing the colonies in two.

=== British forces ===
Burgoyne's progress towards Albany had initially met with some success, including the scattering of Seth Warner's men in the Battle of Hubbardton. However, his advance had slowed to a crawl by late July, due to logistical difficulties, exacerbated by the American destruction of a key road, and the army's supplies began to dwindle. Burgoyne's concern over supplies was magnified in early August when he received word that Howe was going to Philadelphia, rather than advance up the Hudson River valley. In response to a proposal first made on July 22 by the commander of his Hessian troops, Baron Riedesel, Burgoyne sent a detachment of about 800 soldiers under the command of Lieutenant-Colonel Friedrich Baum from Fort Miller on a foraging mission to acquire horses for Prince Ludwig's Dragoon Regiment, draft animals to assist in moving the army, and to harass the Americans. Baum's detachment was primarily made up of dismounted dragoons from Prince Ludwig's Dragoon Regiment. Along the way, 150 local Loyalists, 58 Canadian irregulars, around 100 Iroquois warriors, and 48 soldiers from the British Army's Company of Select Marksmen joined the detachment. Baum was originally ordered to proceed to the Connecticut River valley where they believed horses could be procured for the dragoons. However, as Baum was preparing to leave, Burgoyne changed the goal to be a supply depot at Bennington, having received intelligence reports that the town was defended only by 400 demoralized militia from Warner's command.

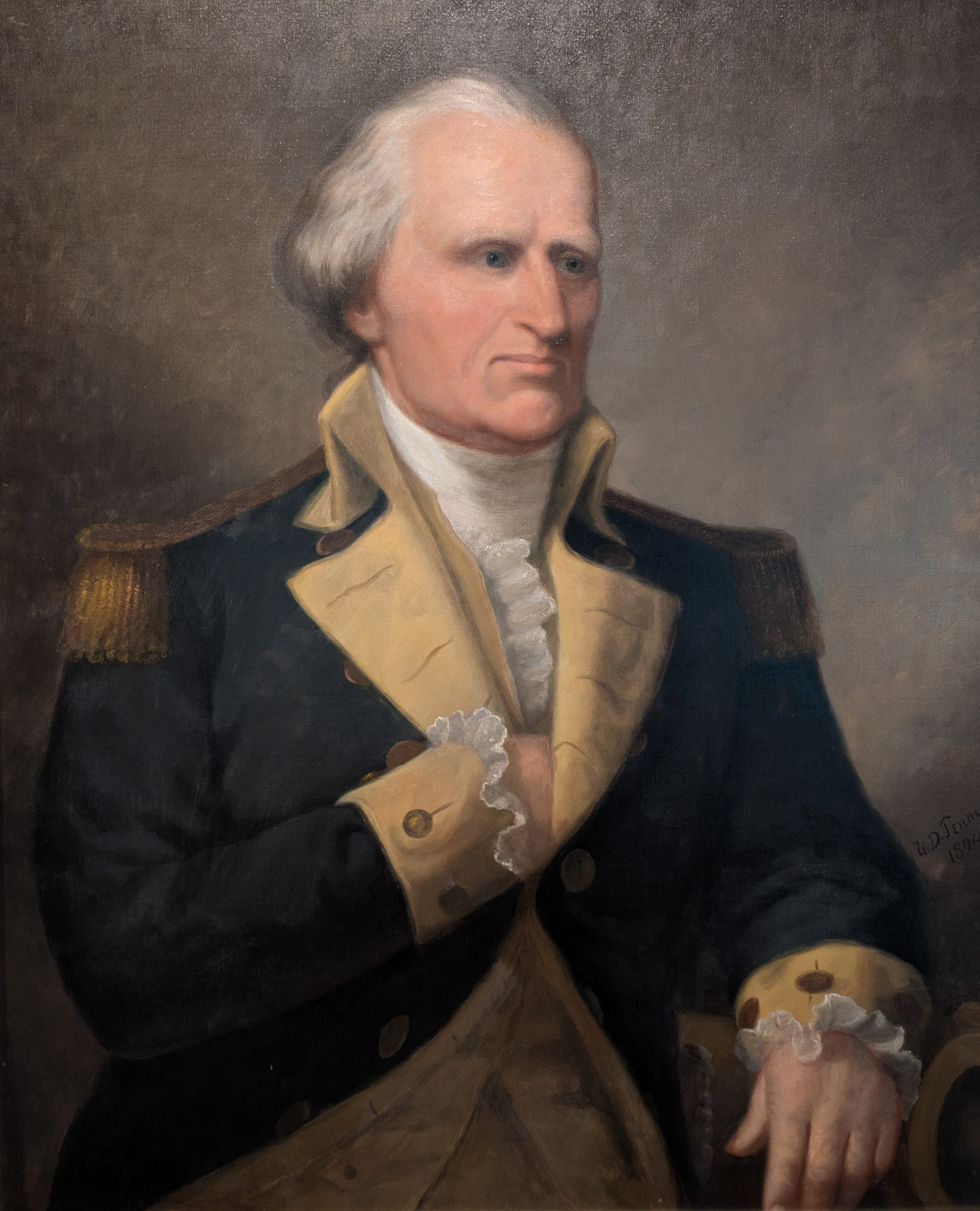
General John Stark, by Ulysses Dow Tenney

=== American forces ===
Unknown to Burgoyne, the citizens of the New Hampshire Grants territory (now Vermont, which was then disputed between New York and the Vermont Republic) had appealed to the states of New Hampshire and Massachusetts for protection from the invading army following the British capture of Ticonderoga. New Hampshire responded on July 18 by authorizing John Stark to raise a militia for the defense of the people "or the annoyance of the enemy". Using funds provided by John Langdon, Stark raised 1,500 New Hampshire militiamen in the space of six days, more than 10% of New Hampshire's male population over the age of sixteen. They were first marched to the Fort at Number 4 (modern-day Charlestown, New Hampshire), then crossed the Connecticut river border into the Grants and stopped at Manchester, where Stark conferred with Warner. While in Manchester, General Benjamin Lincoln, whose promotion in preference to Stark had been the cause for Stark's resignation from the Continental Army, attempted to assert Army authority over Stark and his men. Stark refused, stating that he was solely responsible to the New Hampshire authorities. Stark then went on to Bennington with Warner as a guide, while Warner's men remained in Manchester. Lincoln returned to the American camp at Stillwater, where he and General Philip Schuyler hatched a plan for Lincoln, with 500 men, to join with Stark and Warner in actions to harass Burgoyne's communications and supply lines at Skenesboro. Baum's movements significantly altered these plans.

== Prelude ==
Baum's troops left Burgoyne's camp at Fort Edward on August 9 and marched to Fort Miller, where they waited until they were joined by the Iroquois and the Company of Select Marksmen. The company marched off toward Bennington on August 11. In minor skirmishes along the way they learned from prisoners taken that a sizable force was in place at Bennington. On August 14 Baum's men encountered a detachment of Stark's men that had been sent out to investigate reports of British-allied Indians in the area. Stark's men retreated, destroying a bridge to delay Baum's advance. Stark, on receiving word of the approaching force, sent a request to Manchester for support, and then moved his troops out of Bennington toward Baum's force, setting up a defensive line. Baum sent a message to Burgoyne following the first contact indicating that the American force was larger than expected, but that it was likely to retreat before him. He then advanced a few miles further until he neared Stark's position. He then realized that at least part of his first message was incorrect, so he sent a second message to Burgoyne, requesting reinforcements.

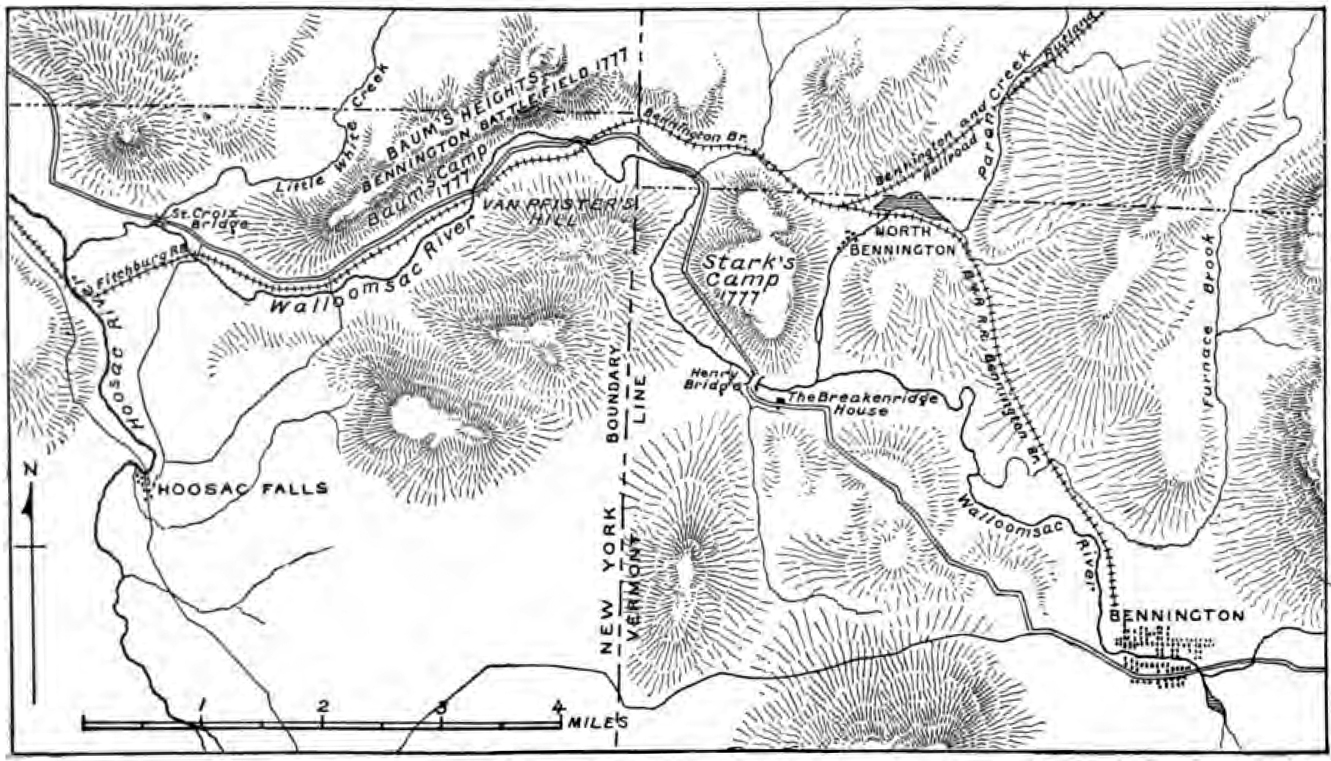
An early 20th-century map depicting the battlefield

It rained for the next day and a half, preventing battle. During this time, Baum's men constructed a small redoubt at the crest of the hill and hoped that the weather would prevent the Americans from attacking before reinforcements arrived. Stark sent out skirmishers to probe the Hessians lines, who killed thirty British-allied Iroquois warriors in spite of the difficulties of keeping their gunpowder dry. Reinforcements for both sides marched out on the 15th; travel was quite difficult due to the heavy rains. Burgoyne sent 550 men under Heinrich von Breymann, while Warner's company of about 350 Green Mountain Boys came south from Manchester under Lieutenant Samuel Safford's command.

Late on the night of August 15, Stark was awakened by the arrival of Parson Thomas Allen and a band of Massachusetts militiamen from nearby Berkshire County who insisted on joining his force. In response to the minister's fiery threat that his men would never come out again if they were not allowed to participate, Stark is reported to have said, "Would you go now on this dark and rainy night? Go back to your people and tell them to get some rest if they can, and if the Lord gives us sunshine to-morrow and I do not give you fighting enough, I will never call on you to come again." Stark's forces again swelled the next day with the arrival of some Stockbridge Indians, bringing his force (excluding Warner's men) to nearly 2,000 men.

Stark was not the only beneficiary of unexpected reinforcements; Baum's force grew by almost 100 when a group of local Loyalists arrived in his camp on the morning of August 16.

== Battle ==
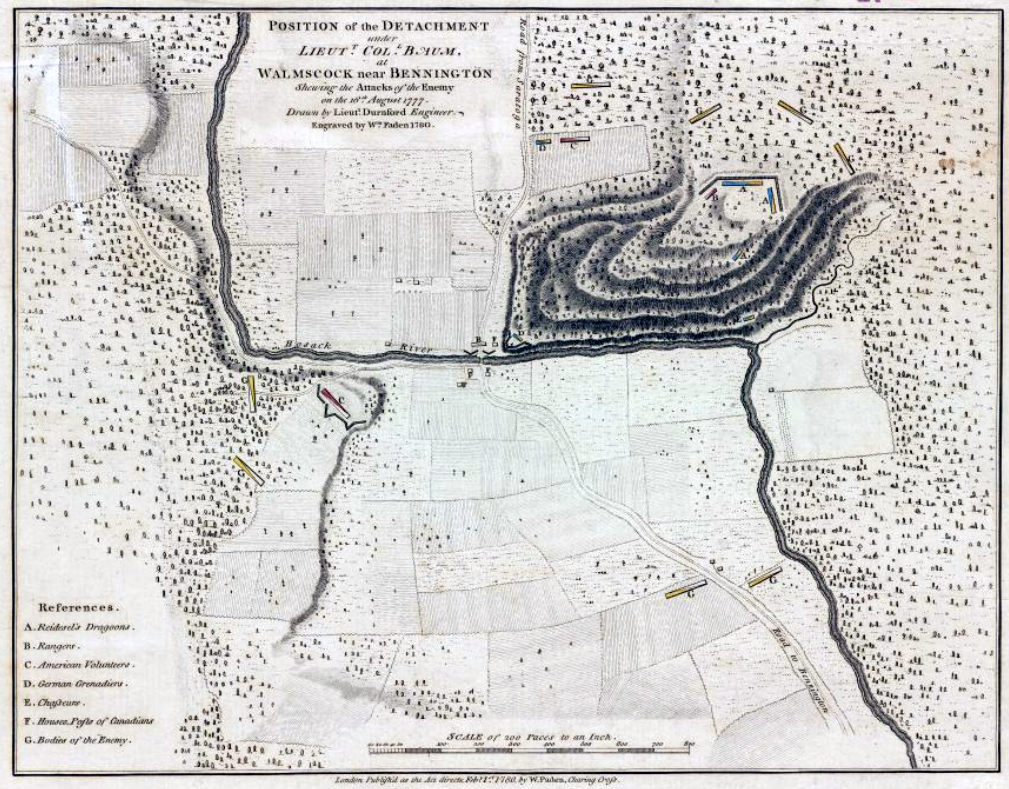
1780 map depicting troop positions at the start of the battle

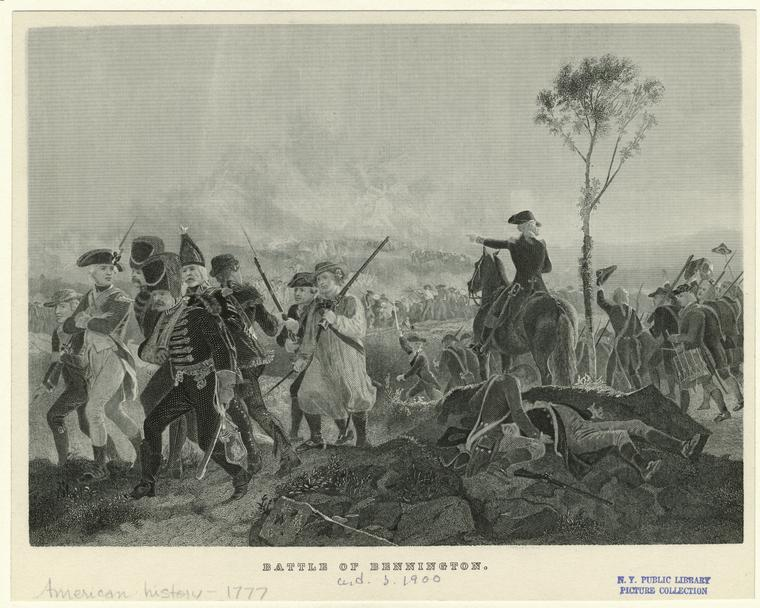
c. 1900 illustration of the battle

On the afternoon of August 16, the weather cleared, and Stark ordered his men to be ready to attack. Stark is reputed to have rallied his troops by saying they were here to fight for their "natural born rights as Englishmen" and he added "There are your enemies, the Red Coats and the Tories. They are ours, or this night Molly Stark sleeps a widow." Upon hearing that the militia had melted away into the woods, Baum assumed that the Americans were retreating or redeploying. However, Stark had decided to capitalize on weaknesses in the widely distributed position of the Hessians, and had sent sizable flanking parties to either side of his lines. These movements were assisted by a ruse employed by Stark's men that enabled them to get closer safely without alarming the opposing forces. The Hessians, most of whom spoke no English, had been told that soldiers with bits of white paper in their hats were Loyalists, and should not be fired on; Stark's men had also heard this and many of them had adorned their hats with white paper.

When the fighting broke out around 3:00 PM the Hessian position was immediately surrounded by gunfire, which Stark described as "the hottest engagement I have ever witnessed, resembling a continual clap of thunder." The Loyalist and Iroquois positions were quickly overrun, causing many of them to flee or surrender. This left Baum and his dragoons trapped alone on the high ground. The Hessians fought valiantly, even after their ammunition wagon was destroyed. As their powder ran low, they resorted to hand-to-hand combat. In desperation, Baum ordered the dragoons to remount their horses and charge the Americans hoping to break through and escape. The Americans held fast and fired on the charging Hessians, killing many and shattering their morale. The remaining Hessians surrendered, while Baum soon died from a mortal wound.

After the battle ended, while Stark's militiamen were busy disarming the prisoners and looting their supplies, Breymann arrived with his reinforcements. Seeing the Americans in disarray, they immediately pressed their attack. After hastily regrouping, Stark's forces tried to hold their ground against the new Hessian onslaught but began to fall back. Before their lines collapsed, Warner's men arrived on the scene to reinforce Stark's troops. Pitched battle continued until dark, when both sides disengaged. Breymann began a hasty retreat; he had lost one quarter of his force and all of his artillery pieces.

== Aftermath ==
The Bennington flag was long incorrectly believed to have flown during the battle.

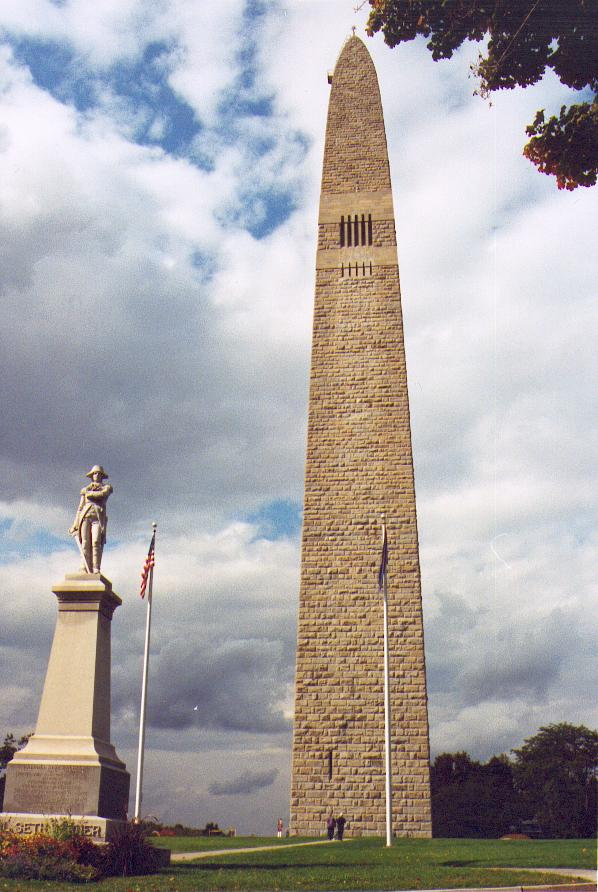
The Bennington Battle Monument in Bennington, Vermont

Total Hessian, Loyalist and Iroquois losses at Bennington were recorded at 207 dead and 700 captured; American losses included 30 Americans dead and 40 wounded. The battle was at times particularly brutal when Loyalists met Patriots, as in some cases they came from the same communities. The prisoners, who were first kept in Bennington, were eventually marched to Boston.

Burgoyne's army was readying to cross the Hudson at Fort Edward on August 17 when the first word of the battle arrived. Believing that reinforcements might be necessary, Burgoyne marched the army toward Bennington until further word arrived that Breymann and the remnants of his force were returning. Stragglers continued to arrive throughout the day and night, while word of the disaster spread within the camp.

The effect on Burgoyne's campaign was significant. Not only had he lost nearly 1,000 men, of which half were irreplaceable regular troops, but he soon lost his Indian allies as well. In a council following the battle, the tribesmen (who had traveled with him from Quebec) gave up on Burgoyne and deserted him. This loss severely hampered the general's reconnaissance efforts in the days to come. The failure to bring in fresh supplies resulted in even greater strain on the already overextended British supply lines from Canada, which eventually broke in September. The shortage of supplies was a significant factor in Burgoyne's decision to surrender at Saratoga, following which France entered the war.

American Patriots reacted to news of the battle with optimism. Especially after Burgoyne's Indian screen left him, small groups of local Patriots began to emerge to harass the fringes of British positions. A significant portion of Stark's force returned home and did not again become influential in the campaign until appearing at Saratoga on October 13 to complete the encirclement of Burgoyne's army.

John Stark's reward from the New Hampshire General Assembly for "the Memorable Battle of Bennington" was "a compleat suit of Clothes becoming his Rank". A reward that Stark likely valued the highest was a message of thanks from John Hancock, president of the Continental Congress, which included a commission as "brigadier in the army of the United States".

== Order of battle ==
The battle forces are generally described as in Morrissey. His numbers are generally consistent with other sources on the British units, although there is disagreement across a wide array of sources on the number of troops under Breymann, which are generally listed at either approximately 550 or 650. Morrissey is also incorrect in identifying some of the American units. He identifies William Gregg as having a separate command; Gregg apparently led several companies in Nichols' regiment. Morrissey also failed to include the Massachusetts militia, and misidentified Langdon's company, erroneously believing they may have been from Worcester, Massachusetts. (Militia companies from the Worcester area marched on Bennington, with some companies arriving the day after the battle.) Langdon originally raised his company in 1776, but it did not become a cavalry unit until 1778.

=== American units ===
New Hampshire Militia
Hobart's Regiment of Militia (150)
Nichols' Regiment of Militia (550)
Stickney's Regiment of Militia (150)
Langdon's Company of Light Horse Volunteers (unknown)
Other New Hampshire Militia units (1,000)
Vermont Militia
Herrick's Regiment (300)
Other Vermont Militia units (200)
Massachusetts Militia
Simonds' Regiment of Militia (unknown)
Continental Army
Warner's Additional Continental Regiment (350)

=== British units ===
Baum's forces
Prince Ludwig's Dragoon Regiment (205)
Von Breyman's Grenadier Battalion (24)
Von Barner's Light Infantry Battalion (57)
Riedesel's Musketeer Regiment, Specht's Musketeer Regiment and Von Rhetz's Musketeer Regiment (37)
Pausch's Company of Artillery (13)
Queen's Loyal Rangers (150+)
Company of Select Marksmen (48)
Loyalist irregulars (150+)
Canadian irregulars (56)
Iroquois warriors (100+)
Breymann's forces
Von Breyman's Grenadier Battalion (353)
Von Barner's Light Infantry Battalion (277)
Pausch's Company of Artillery (20)

== Commemorations ==
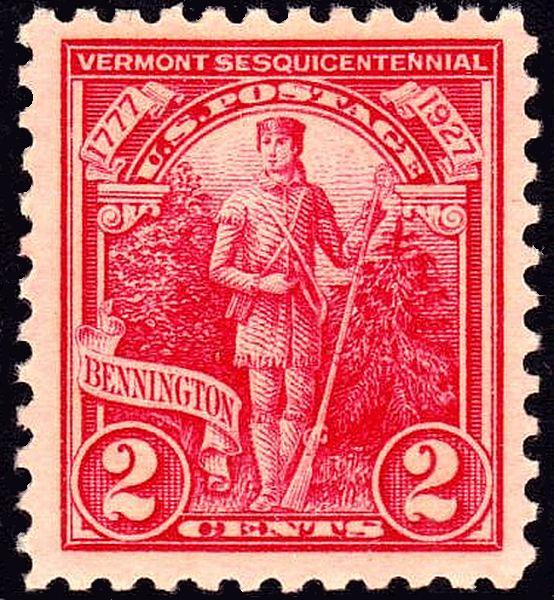
150th anniversary of Battle of Bennington commemorative stamp

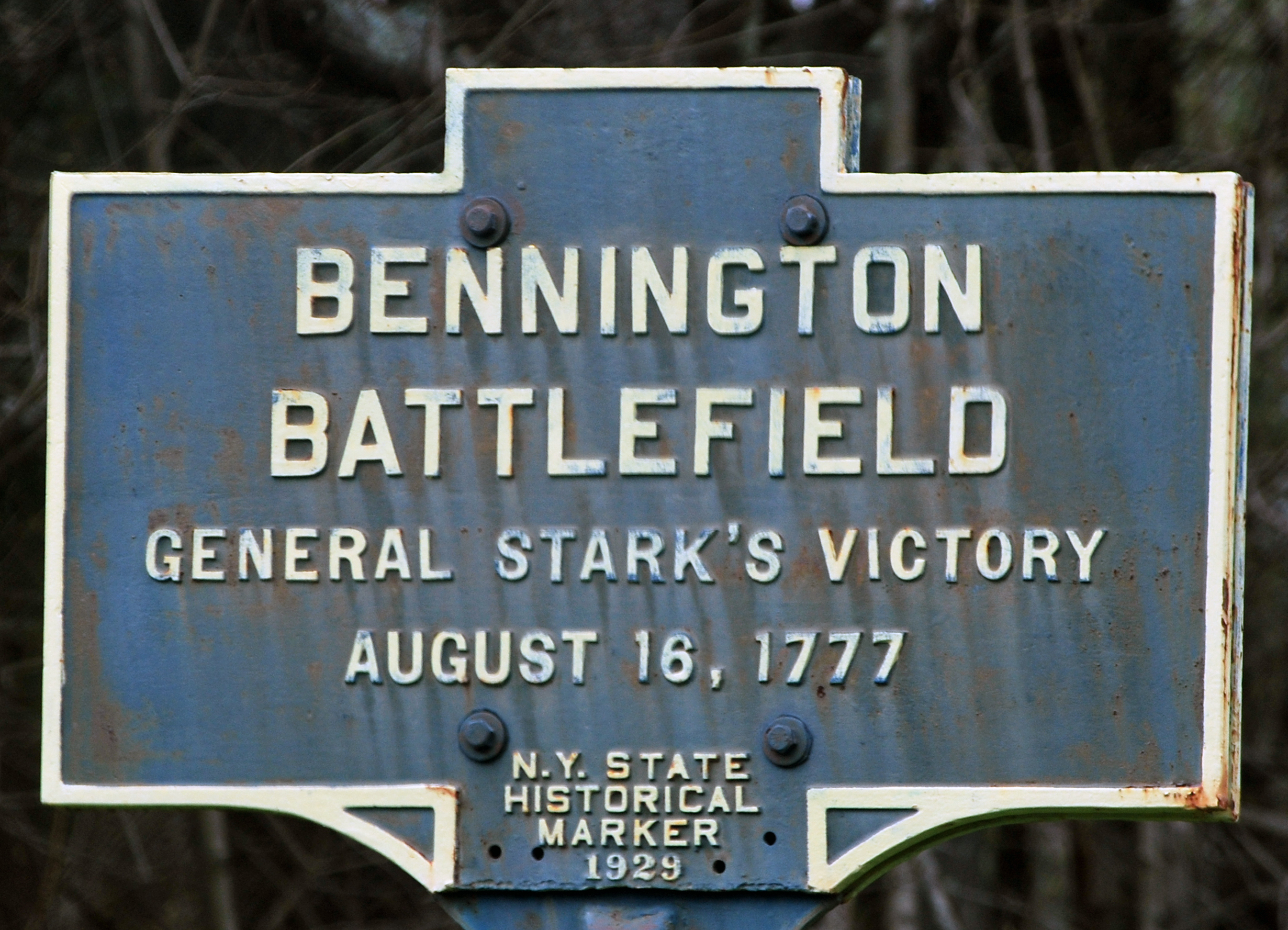
Historic Marker marking the Bennington Battlefield Park

August 16 is a legal holiday in Vermont, known as Bennington Battle Day. The battlefield, now a New York state historic site, was designated a National Historic Landmark on January 20, 1961, and added to the National Register of Historic Places on October 15, 1966. In the 1870s, the local historic society in Bennington commissioned the design and construction of the Bennington Battle Monument, which was complete in 1889 and dedicated in 1891 with ceremonies attended by President Benjamin Harrison. The Monument, an obelisk 306 feet (93 m) high, is also listed on the National Register of Historic Places. Although the monument was not ready in time to mark the centennial of the battle, the 100th anniversary of the battle was marked by speeches attended by President Rutherford B. Hayes.

Every year on Bennington Battle Day there is a firing of the Molly Stark Cannon, the oldest firing cannon in the United States. The cannon was captured at the Battle of Bennington.

== See also ==
- List of American Revolutionary War battles
- American Revolutionary War § British northern strategy fails - Places 'Battle of Bennington' in overall sequence and strategic context.
- USS Bennington – aircraft carrier named in honor of the battle
