= Brunswick troops in the American Revolutionary War =

German troops who fought on the British side of the American Revolutionary War

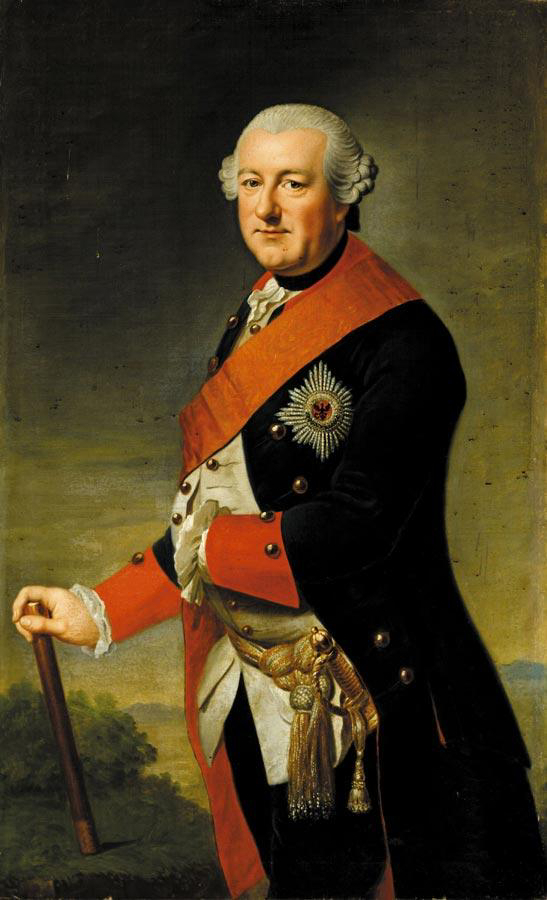
Duke Charles I, the reigning Duke of Brunswick-Wolfenbüttel.

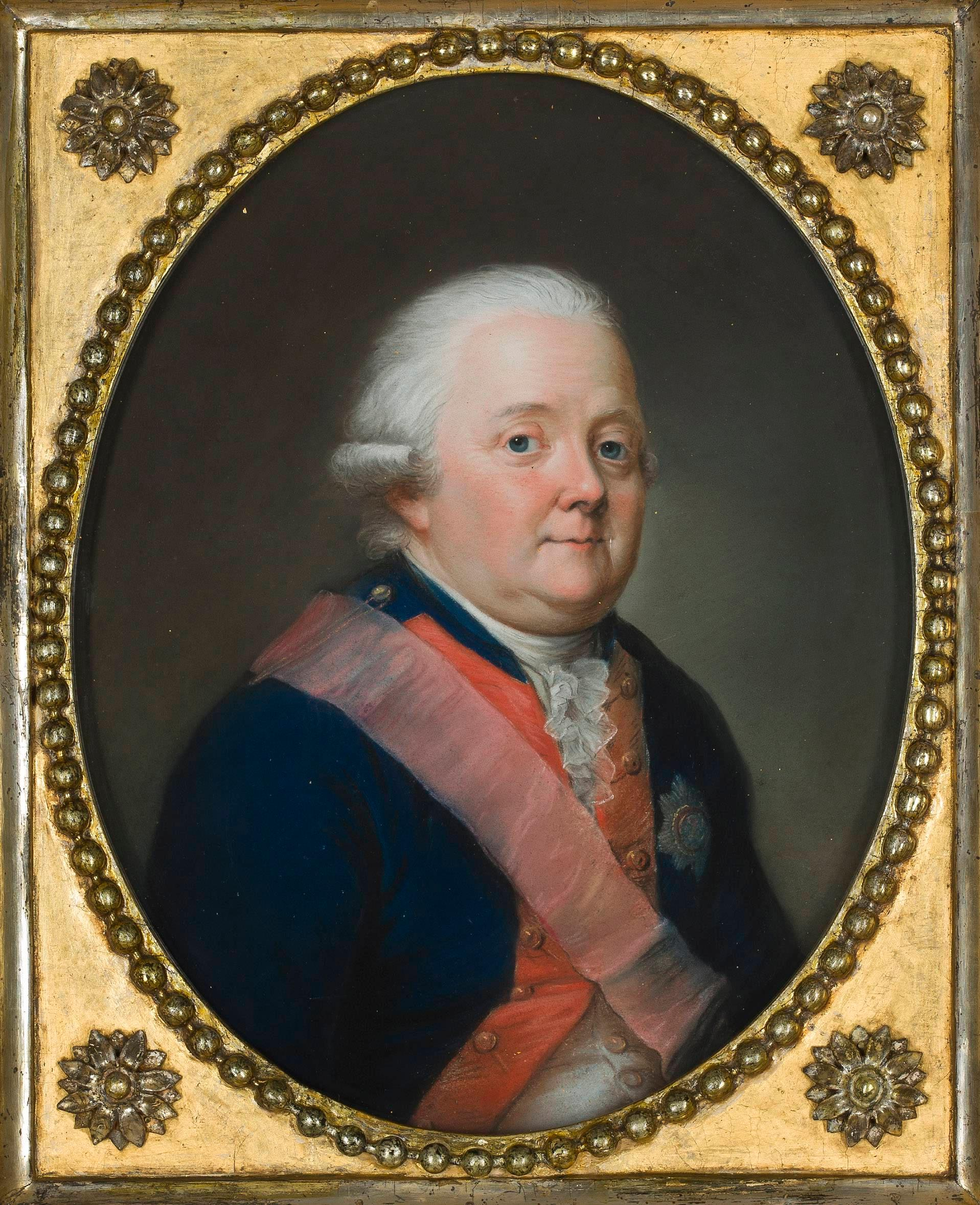
Major General Friedrich Adolf Riedesel, commanding general of the Brunswick Corps.

Brunswick troops in the American Revolutionary War served as auxiliaries to the British Army during the American Revolutionary War, in accordance with the treaty of 1776 between Great Britain and the Principality of Brunswick-Wolfenbüttel. Four regiments of foot, one regiment of dragoons, one grenadier battalion, and one light battalion with a Jäger company were dispatched to British America. Most of the Brunswick troops fought at the Battles of Saratoga, where they were forced to surrender as part of British General John Burgoyne's army. A total of 5,723 soldiers were sent overseas, and 2,708 returned to Brunswick-Wolfenbüttel. Part of the difference can be attributed to casualties, but the rest chose to remain in the United States or Canada instead of returning to Europe. Over the course of the war, the British government paid the Prince of Brunswick-Wolfenbüttel a total of £750,000 for the use of his army.

== Background ==
At the outbreak of the American Revolutionary War, Britain felt the need to augment her troops with German auxiliaries, as it had done in previous wars. Duke Charles I was the reigning Duke of Brunswick-Wolfenbüttel; his son and heir, Charles William Ferdinand, was married to Princess Augusta of Great Britain, the sister of George III. The Brunswick army had previously served alongside the British during the Seven Years' War (1756–63), successfully campaigning in the Low Countries, but had not been used since. Colonel William Faucitt, the British emissary, entered into negotiations with Brunswick, and the outcome was the first auxiliary troop treaty of the war between Great Britain and a German state.

== Treaty between Brunswick and Great Britain ==
The treaty between Brunswick and Great Britain was ratified January 9, 1776. It stipulated that Brunswick would make a corps of 3,964 foot and 336 light horse available to Great Britain for service in Europe or America. The corps had to be properly officered, and the men ready for campaign service; the corps had to be fully equipped with the exception of the horses for the cavalry. The corps should be formed into five regiments and two battalions. Brunswick would maintain the number of men in the corps through annual recruitment if necessary. Britain would give the corps the same pay and allowances as enjoyed by British troops, and wounded soldiers would be treated in British military hospitals in the same way as British troops. As levy money Britain would pay 30 Banco-Thaler per man; the Thaler valued at 4 shilling, 9 3/4 pence sterling. For each man killed, or three man wounded, the same amount would be paid. For each year of service, Britain should pay 64,500 Banco-Thaler to the Duke of Brunswick. The total subsidies paid to Brunswick-Wolfenbüttel for these troops were 5,250,000 Banco-Thaler, or 750,000 pound sterling.

In an appendix to the treaty between Great Britain and Brunswick, the number and composition of the troops to be raised were stipulated in detail:

- General staff, 22 officers and other ranks.
- Regiment of foot
  - Staff, 25 officers and other ranks.
  - Company of foot, 131 officers and other ranks.
  - With five companies, a regiment of foot contained 680 officers and other ranks.
- Battalion of grenadiers
  - Staff, 8 officers and other ranks.
  - Company of grenadiers, 139 officers and other ranks.
  - With four companies of grenadiers, the battalion contained 564 officers and other ranks.
- Regiment of dragoons
  - Staff, 24 officers and other ranks.
  - Company of dragoons, 78 officers and other ranks.
  - With four companies of dragoons, the regiment contained 336 officers and other ranks.
- Light battalion
  - Staff, 11 officers and other ranks.
  - Company of chasseurs, 147 officers and other ranks.
  - Light company, 125 officers and other ranks.
  - With one company of chasseurs and four light companies, the battalion contained 658 officers and other ranks.

== Organization of the Brunswick Corps ==
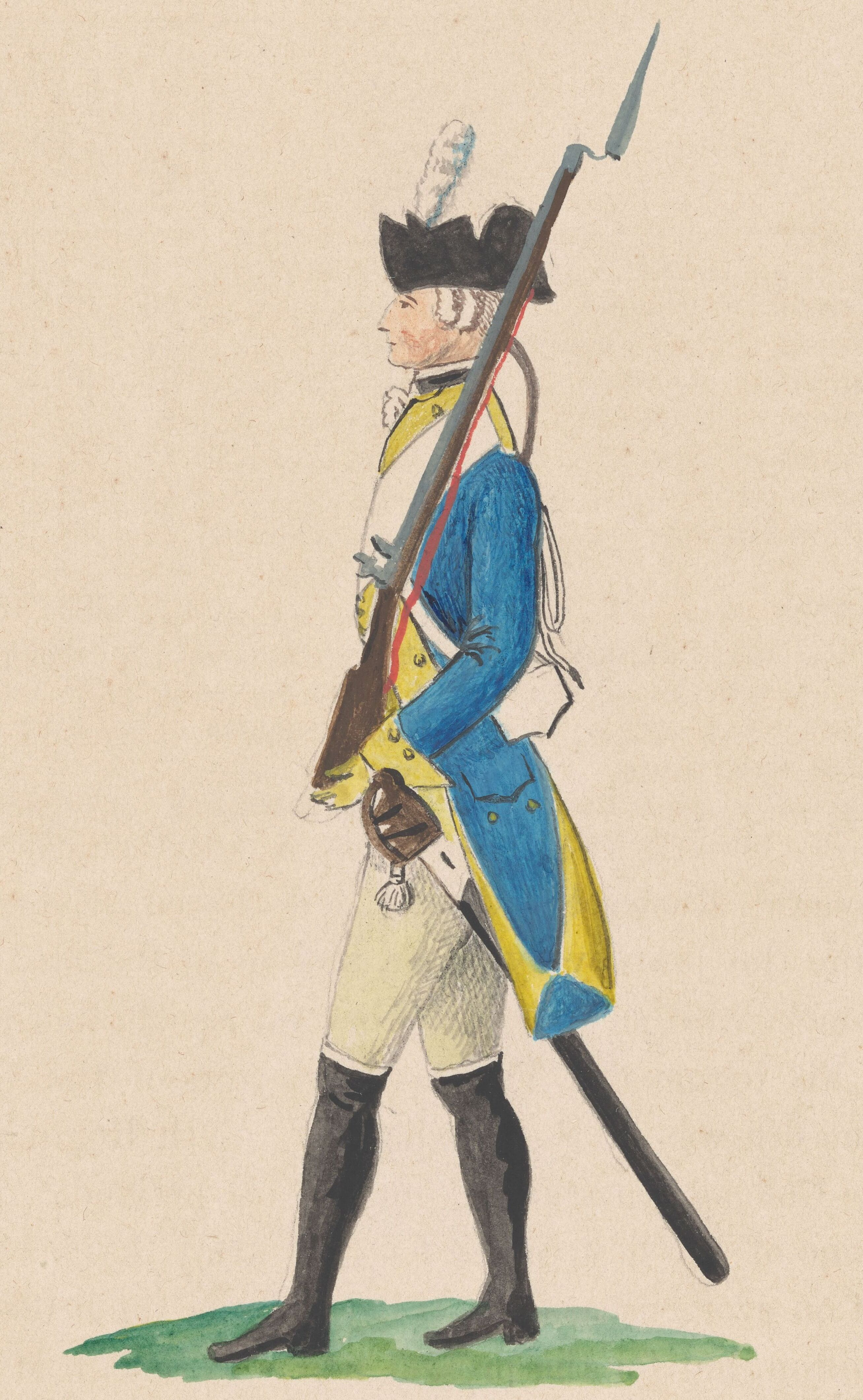
A private of Prince Ludwig's Dragoon Regiment in 1778

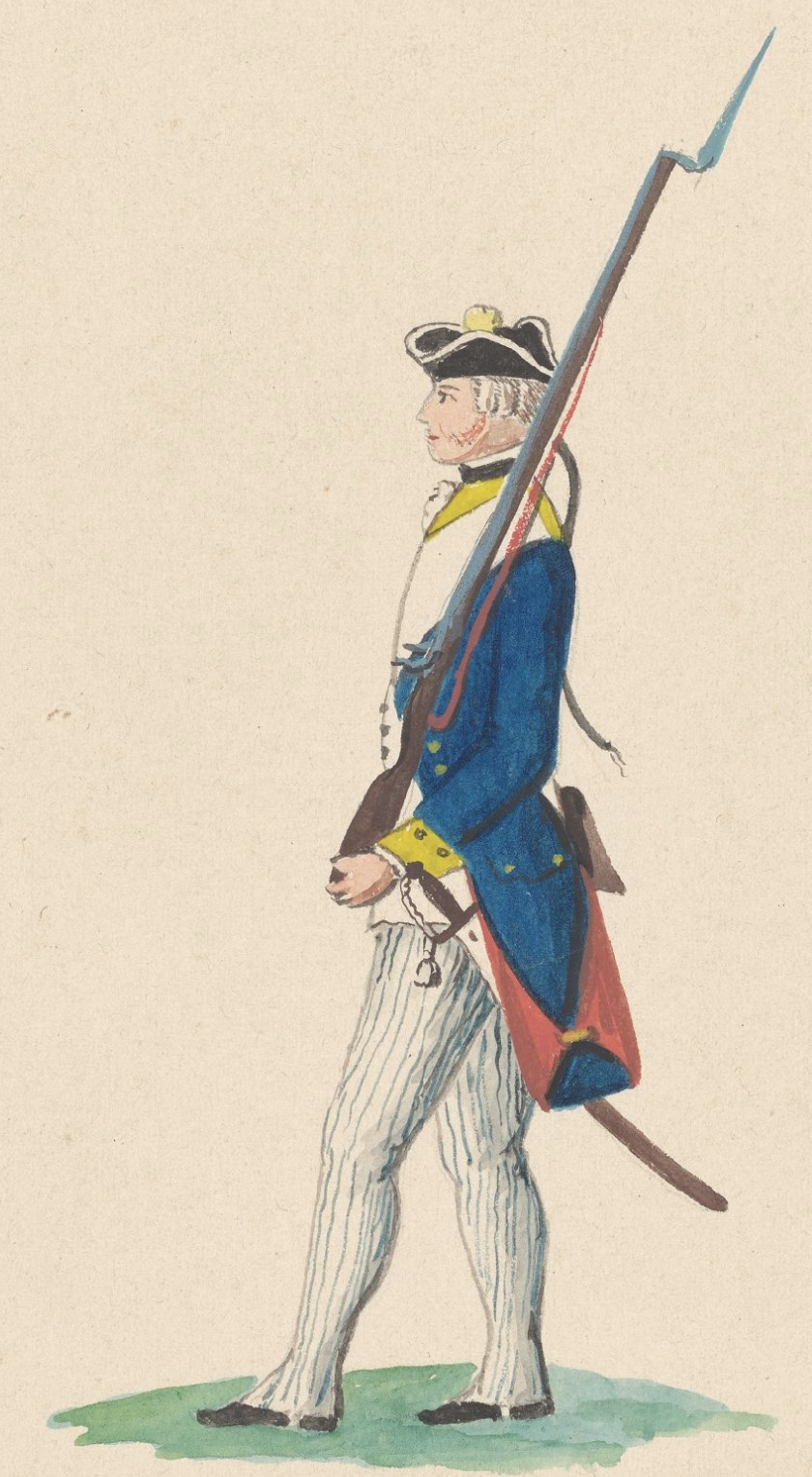
A private of Prince Friedrich's Musketeer Regiment in 1778

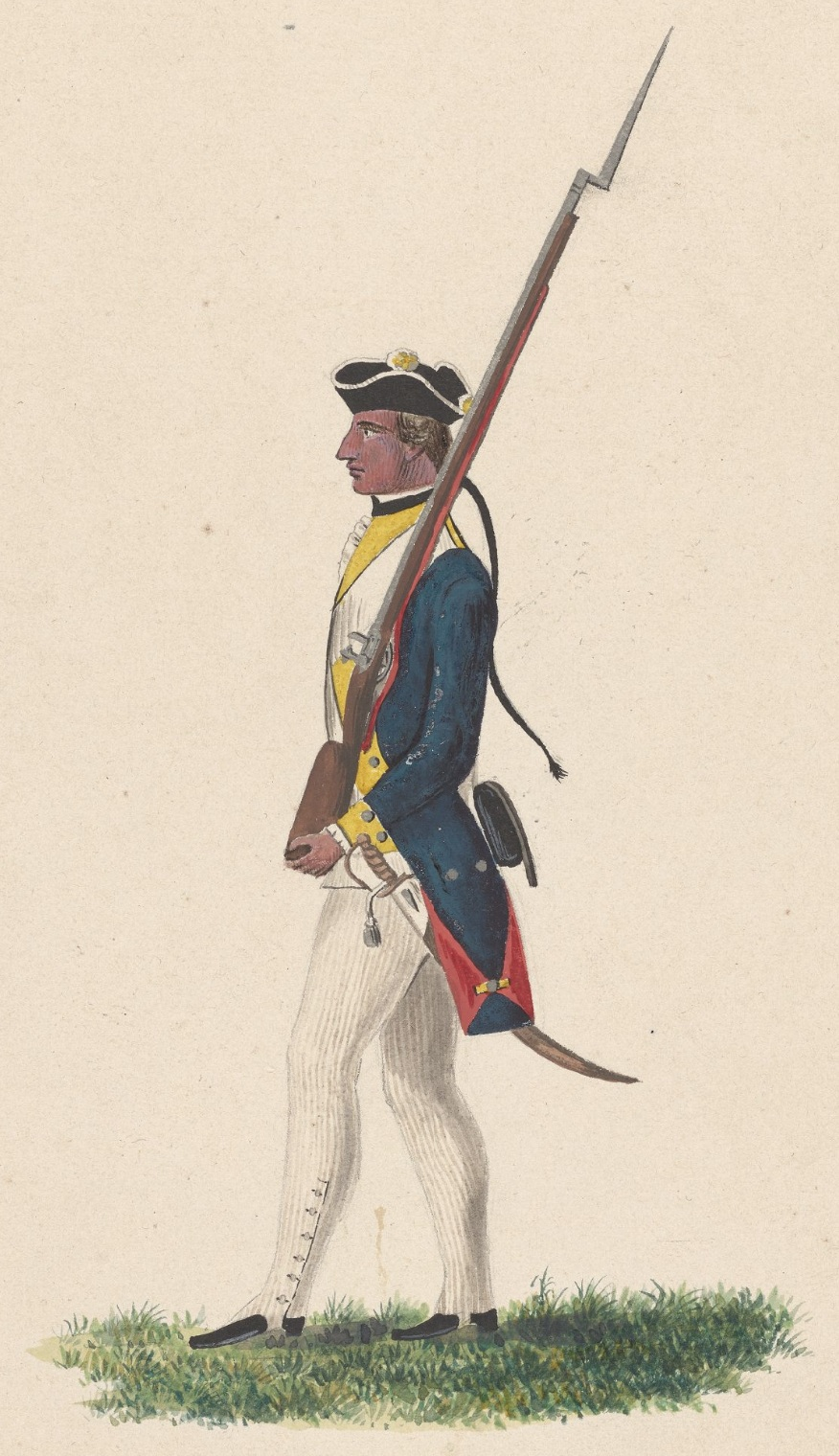
A private of Riedesel's Musketeer Regiment in 1778

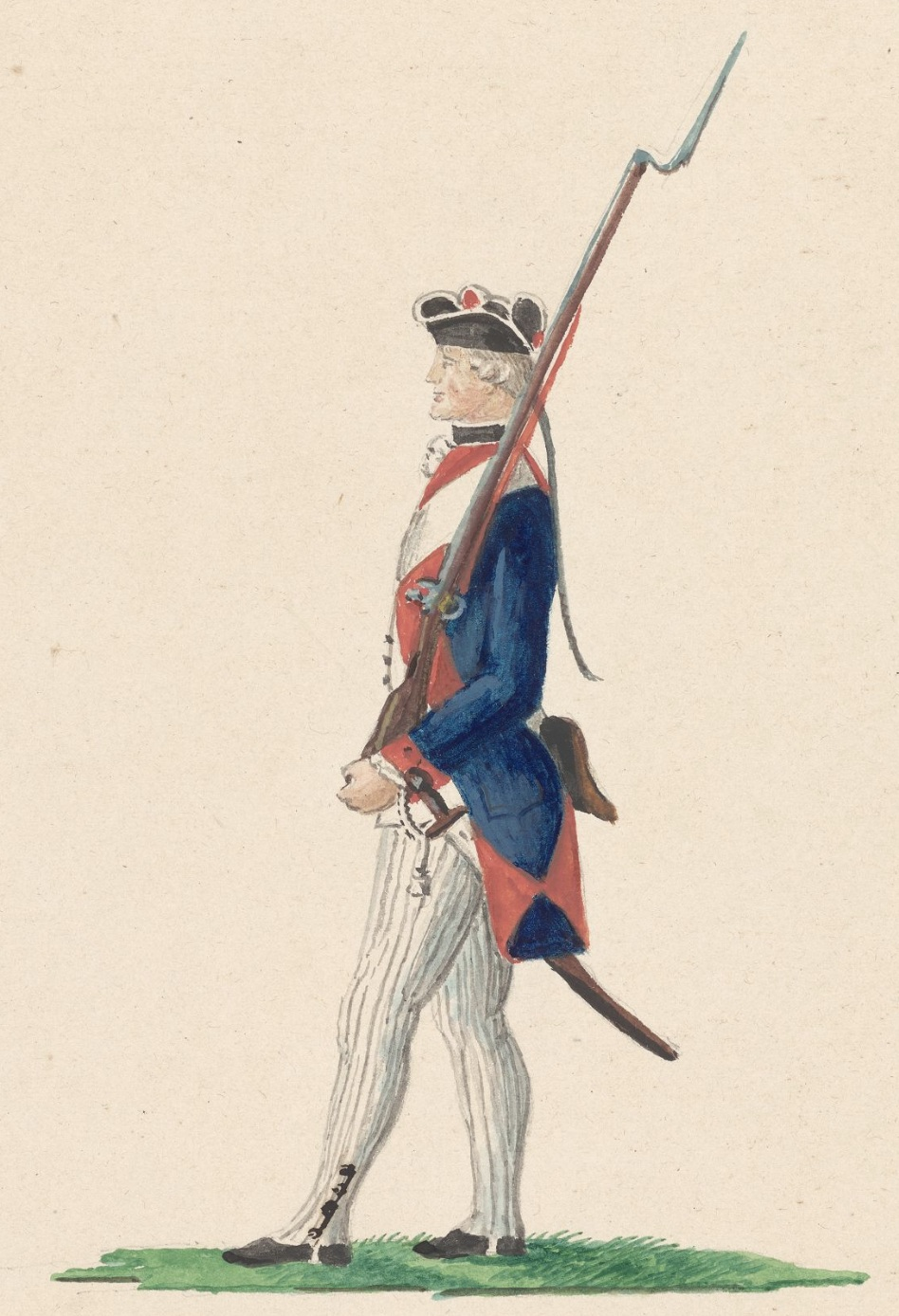
A private of von Specht's Musketeer Regiment in 1778

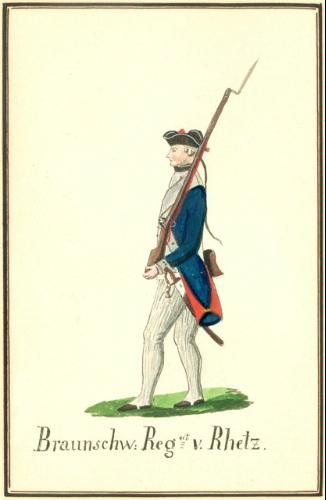
A private of von Rhetz's Musketeer Regiment in 1778

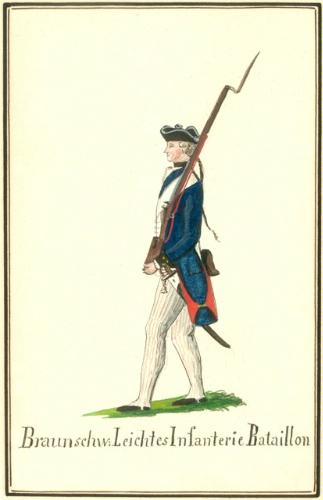
A private von Barner's Light Infantry Battalion in 1778

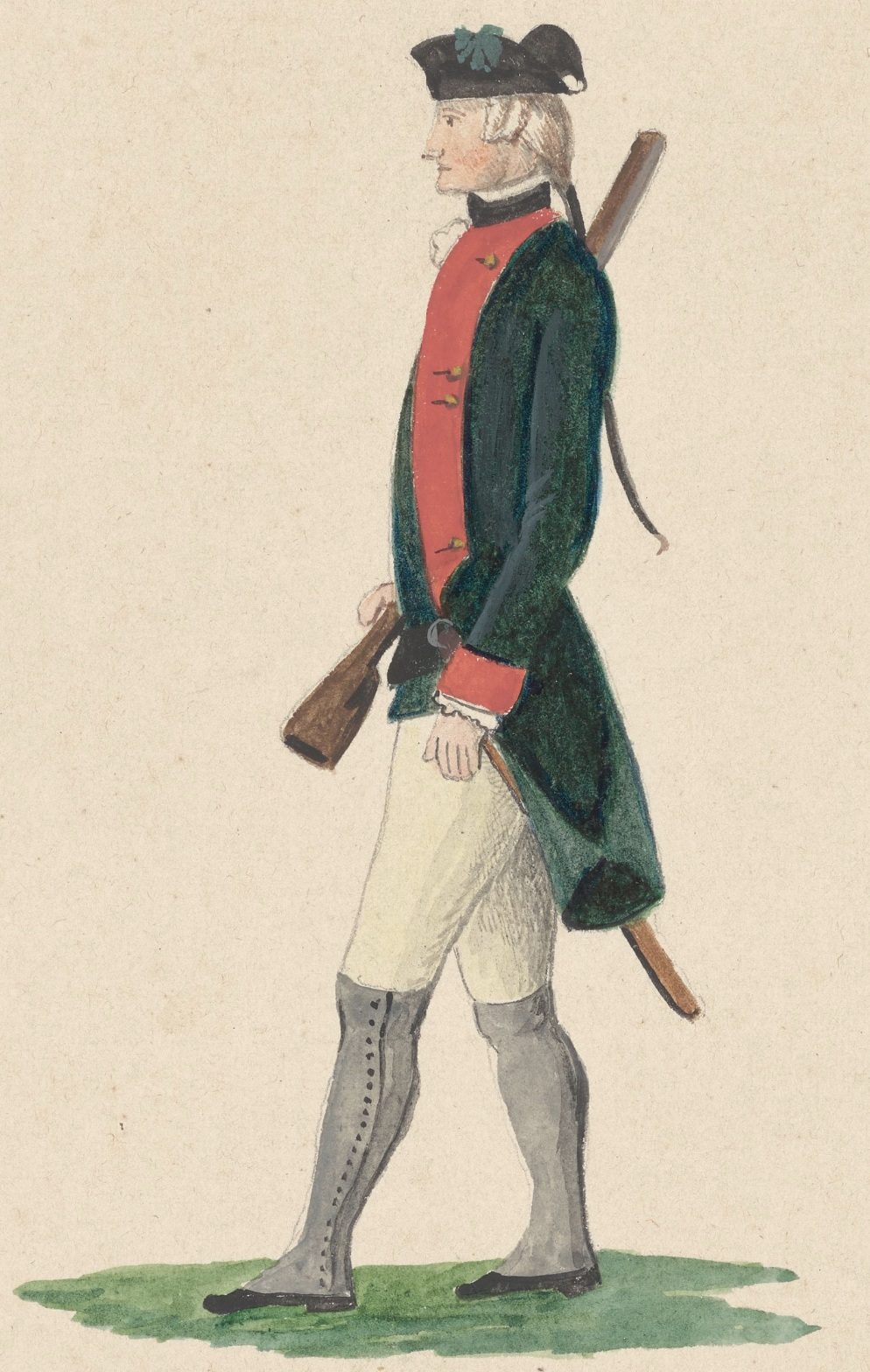
A private of von Barner's Light Infantry Battalion in 1778

The peace-time military establishment of Brunswick-Wolfenbüttel consisted of the regular Dragoon Regiment, Life Regiment, Regiment Prinz Friedrich, Regiment von Rhetz, Artillery Battalion and Corps of Engineers. Each of the three foot regiments had two battalions. In addition the reserve troops consisted of the Garrison Regiment, the Land Regiment (militia) and two invalid companies.

=== Original organization in 1776 ===
The Brunswick Corps comprised four line infantry regiments, a grenadier battalion, a light infantry battalion and a dragoon regiment:

General Staff
Commanding General	Major General Friedrich Adolf Riedesel zu Eisenach

Prince Ludwig's Dragoon Regiment
Commanding Officer	Lieutenant Colonel Friedrich Baum (Note: Wounded at the Battle of Bennington 1777, and died two days later.)
Field Officer	Major Justus Christoph von Meibom
Squadron	Officer Commanding
Life Squadron	Stabsrittmeister Carl Schlagenteuffel
Squadron	Rittmeister Carl Friedrich Reinking (Note: Killed at the Battle of Bennington 1777.)
Major's Squadron	Stabsrittmeister Heinrich Christian Fricke
Squadron	Rittmeister Adolph Schlagenteuffel

Prince Friedrich's Musketeer Regiment
Commanding Officer	Lieutenant Colonel Christian Julius Prätorius
Field Officer	Major Friedrich Wilhelm Hille
Company	Officer Commanding
Life Company	Staff Captain Friedrich Albert Rosenberg
Lieutenant-Colonel's Company	Staff Captain George Ernst Zielberg
Major's Company	Staff Captain Jacob Christian Sander
Company	Captain Adolph Lorenz Dietrich
Company	Captain Carl August Heinrich Tunderfeld

Riesedel's Musketeer Regiment
Commanding Officer	Lieutenant Colonel Ernst Ludwig Wilhelm von Speth.
Field Officer	Major Otto Carl Anton Mengen
Company	Officer Commanding
Life Company	Staff Captain Carl Friedrich Bärtling
Lieutenant-Colonel's Company	Staff Captain Gottlieb Benjamin Harbord
Major's Company	Staff Captain Ernst Heinrich Wilhelm Girsewald
Company	Captain Carl Friedrich Morgenstern
Company	Captain Julius Ludwig August Pöllnitz

Specht's Musketeer Regiment
Commanding Officer	Colonel Johann Friedrich von Specht
Field Officer	Major Carl Friedrich von Ehrenkrook (Note: Belonged to a Swedish noble family, but born in Brunswick. Younger brother of Lieutenant Colonel von Ehrenkrook.)
Company	Officer Commanding
Life Company	Staff Captain Heinrich Jäger (Note: Died in America in 1782)
Major's Company	Staff Captain George Schlagenteuffel
Company	Captain Bernhard Richard Dahlstierna (Note: Died 1778 in Albany, New York from wounds received at the Battle of Freeman's Farm, 1777.) (Note: Dahlstierna was on leave from Swedish service as an ensign in the Queen's Life Regiment.)
Company	Captain August Conrad Lützow
Company	Captain Leopold Franz Friedrich Balthasar Plessen

Von Rhetz's Musketeer Regiment
Commanding Officer	Lieutenant Colonel Johann Gustav von Ehrenkrook (Note: Older rother of Major von Ehrenkrook. Died 1783 in Trois-Rivières.)
Field Officer	Major Balthasar Bogislaus Lucke
Company	Officer Commanding
Life Company	Captain George Philip Arend
Lieutenant Colonel's Company	Staff Captain Heinrich Urban Cleve
Major's Company	Staff Captain Wilhelm Ludwig Fredersdorff (Note: Died 1778 in Albany, New York from wounds received at the Battle of Freeman's Farm, 1777.)
Company	Captain Conrad Anton Alers
Company	Captain Ludewig Schlagenteuffel

Grenadier Battalion von Breymann
Commanding Officer	Lieutenant Colonel Heinrich von Breymann (Note: Killed at the Battle of Freeman's Farm, 1777.)
Company	Officer Commanding
Lieutenant Colonel's Company	Staff Captain August Wilhelm Hambach
Company	Captain Albrecht Daniel Löhneysen
Company	Captain Ernst August Bärtling
Company	Captain Gottfried Dietrich Schlick

Light Infantry Battalion von Barner
Commanding Officer	Major Ferdinand Albrecht von Barner
Company	Officer Commanding
Life Company	Captain Gottlief Joachim Gleisenberg
Company	Captain George Ludewig Thoma
Company	Captain August Friedrich Dommes
Company	Captain Carl Geusau

The Prince Friedrich and Riedesel Musketeer Regiments and grenadier battalion were raised from five line infantry and two grenadier companies from the regular Prince Friedrich's Regiment. The von Rhetz and Specht Regiments came from five companies of the regular Von Rhetz Regiment as well from two companies from the regular Prince Friedrich's Regiment that had not already been used to raise the Prince Friederich and Riedesel field regiments. The Light Infantry Battalion was created through drafts from the Life Regiment and from the companies of Prince Friedrich's Regiment that remained at home. Its Jäger-company was to be raised from scratch, however, and was recruited from crack shots and woodsmen, mostly sons of state game keepers. Each regular company was divided in two, thus creating 28 field companies. The regular Prince Ludwig'z Dragoon Regiment marched off in its entirety, although ten new dragoons had to be enlisted in each squadron. In this way 2,011 already serving enlisted soldiers were raised for the Brunswick Corps. Landeskinder (Brunswick natives) in the field regiments were as far as possible exchanged for soldiers enlisted outside the principality who served in the units that remained at home. To reach the stipulated strength of the Corps, another 2071 soldiers, servants and other support staff were recruited. At home, only the Life Regiment and the Artillery Battalion remained as regular units; the remaining companies of Prince Friedrich's Regiment would reinforce the Land Regiment until the contingent in British service returned. Each field company would have four officers, a captain, a first lieutenant, a second lieutenant and an ensign. They were to be recruited from the regular regiments, with the exception of the Life Regiments. If necessary, retired officers could be used.

=== Reorganization in Canada 1777 ===
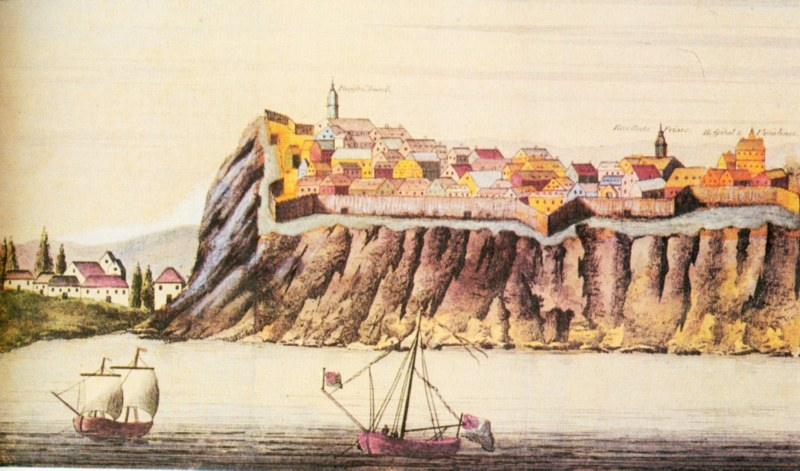
Trois-Rivières at the second half of the 18th century.

In the spring of 1777, as a preparation for the Saratoga campaign, a command for garrison duties that would remain in the winter quarters at Trois-Rivières, was created by detaching a company from each of regiments Prince Ludwig, Prince Friedrich, Riedesel, Specht, von Rhetz and the Hesse-Hanau Regiment Erbprinz and from the battalions von Breymann and von Barner. The "Canadian Command" contained 19 officers, 48 nco's and 600 private soldiers, under the command of Lieutenant Colonel von Ehrenkrook.

=== Reorganization in Canada 1778 ===
After the surrender at Saratoga in the fall of 1777 Ehrenkrook's Command and Prince Friedrich's Regiment, which had been left as garrison at Fort Ticonderoga with the British 53rd Foot, were the only Brunswick units that remained effective. It was determined that Prince's Friedrich's Regiment would be made complete through 450 new recruits that arrived from Germany, and that a new battalion under the command of Lieutenant-colonel von Ehrenkrook would be formed from the infantry and dragoons that had remained in Canada. The remaining old soldiers and new arrivals would be used to re-form the light battalion under Lieutenant Colonel von Barner.

General Staff
Commanding General	Brigadier General (Note: Appointed to temporary local rank by Sir Guy Carleton.)Johann Gustav von Ehrenkrook, 1778-1779; Brigadier General Johann Friedrich von Specht, 1779-1781

Prince Friedrich's Musketeer Regiment
Commanding Officer	Lieutenant Colonel Christian Julius Prätorius
Field Officer	Major Friedrich Wilhelm Hille
Company	Officer Commanding
Life Company	Captain Friedrich Albert Rosenberg
Lieutenant-Colonel's Company	Lieutenant Colonel Christian Julius Prätorius
Major's Company	Major (Note: Promoted to lieutenant colonel in 1781.) Friedrich Wilhelm Hille
Company	Captain Adolph Lorenz Dietrich
Company	Captain Carl August Heinrich Tunderfeld

Regiment von Ehrenkrook
Commanding Officer	Lieutenant Colonel Johann Gustav von Ehrenkrook
Bataillon von Ehrenkrook
Commanding Officer	Lieutenant Colonel Johann Gustav von Ehrenkrook
Company	Officer Commanding
Lieutenant-Colonel's from Rhetz	Lieutenant Colonel Johann Gustav von Ehrenkrook
Company from Riedesel	Captain Ludewig Schlagenteuffel
Company from Specht	Captain Leopold Franz Friedrich Balthasar Plessen
Company from Dragoons	Captain George Ernst Zielberg
Bataillon von Barner
Commanding Officer	Major Ferdinand Albrecht von Barner
Company	Officer Commanding
Life Company from Light Infantry	Major Ferdinand Albrecht von Barner
Company from Light Infantry	Captain George Ludewig Thoma
Company from Light Infantry	Captain Friedrich Albert Rosenberg
Company from Grenadiers	Captain August Wilhelm Hambach

=== Reorganization in Canada, 1781 ===
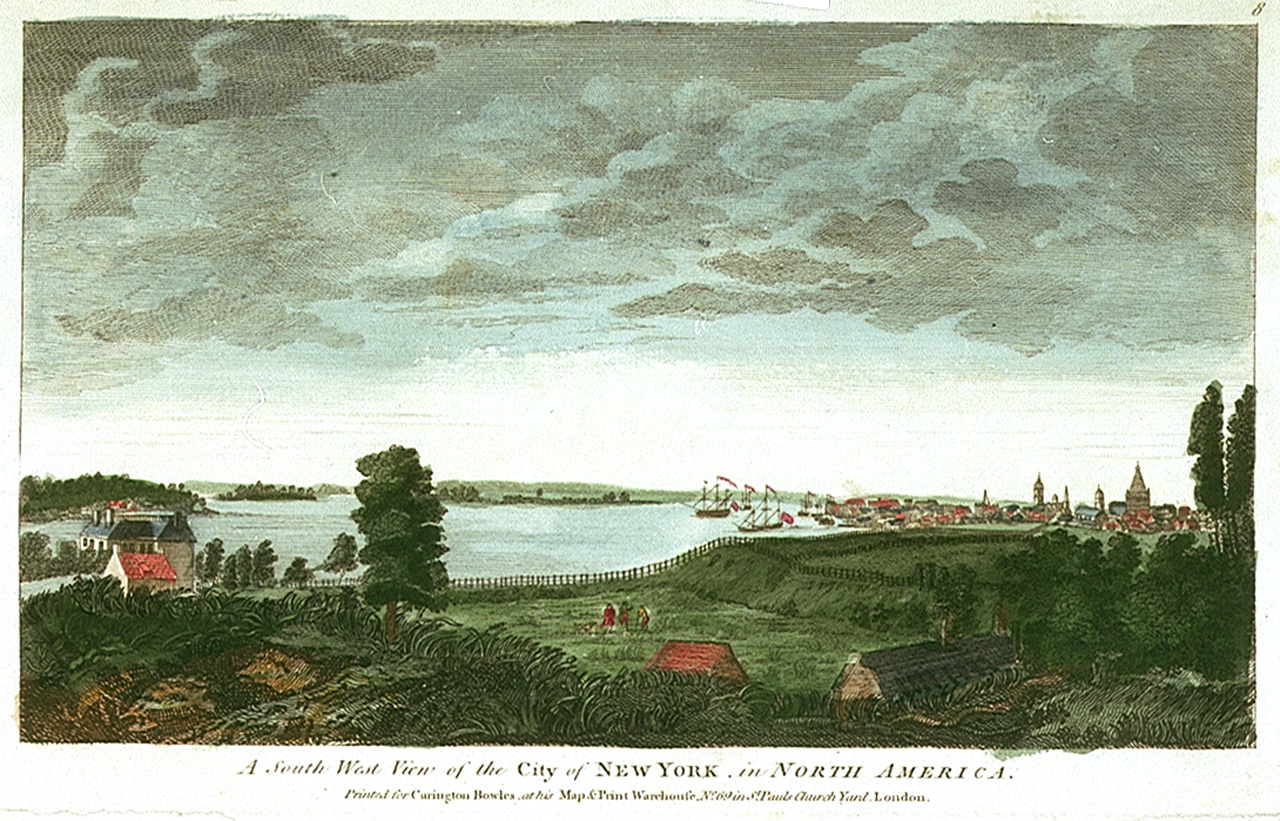
Exchanged soldiers from the Brunswick Corps were gathered in British-held New York City before they returned to Canada.

As the Convention of Saratoga faltered, regular exchange of prisoners took place between the belligerents. About 440 exchanged soldiers from the Brunswick Corps were gathered in British-held New York City, where General Riedesel stayed on parole. When the general in was exchanged against three Patriot officers, he and the exchanged soldiers were returned to Canada where another reorganization took place in 1781. With the addition of fresh recruits from Germany, the original regiments would this time be restored to the greatest extent possible. Detached soldiers should return to their mother regiments, and new recruits who already in Germany had enlisted for specific regiments were to be enrolled in these. The Grenadier battalion was to weak to be restored, and its soldiers were used to create one incomplete grenadier company per musketeer regiment.

General Staff
Commanding General	Major General Friedrich Adolf Riedesel

Regiments	Commanding Officers
Dragoons	Captain Ludewig Schlagenteuffel
Prince Friedrich	Lieutenant Colonel Christian Julius Prätorius
Riedesel	Major Friedrich Wilhelm Hille
Specht	Major Balthasar Bogislaus Lucke
von Rhetz	Lieutenant Colonel Johann Gustav von Ehrenkrook
Light Infantry	Major Ferdinand Albrecht von Barner

== Strength of the Brunswick Corps in British America ==
From Brunswick 1776	4,300
Recruits sent in March 1777	224
Recruits sent in April 1778	475
Recruits sent in April 1779	286
Recruits sent in May 1780	266
Recruits sent in April 1782	172
Total	5,723
Returned 1783	2,708
Did not return	3,015

Year	Serving in Canada	Convention Army in America	Prisoners-of-war
1781	2,520	1,053	325
1782	2,788	n/a	1,137

== Pay and rations ==
Pay of the Brunswick Corps in British America
Rank	Pay in Army Sterling (Note: One pound army sterling was the equivalent of .9643 pound sterling.) per lunar month after stoppages £/s/p/f
Colonel	17/16/5/1 (Note: Also pay as Captain)
Lieutenant Colonel	8/18/10/3
Major	6/7/8/3½
Captain	12/15/3/3
Lieutenant	5/19/0/3 1/3 (Note: Lieutenants who were Staff Captains had an additional pay of £1/2/3/2½)
Ensign	4/15/6/½
Sergeant	1/13/7/0
Non-commissioned officer	1/7/8/0
Corporal	1/1/7/0
Gefreiter	0/16/4/0
Private	0/14/0/0

Rations per Day for Other Ranks of the Brunswick Corps in British America
Item	Amount	Metric
Bread	1 pound	450 grams
Fresh meat	1 pound	450 grams
or salt meat or salt pork	9 1/7 ounces	260 grams
Butter	6/7 ounce	24 grams
Peas or other vegetables	3/7 pound	194 grams
Rice	7/8 ounce	25 grams

== Campaigns ==
The Brunswick Corps participated in the Siege of Ticonderoga, Battle of Bennington, Battle of Freeman's Farm, Battle of Bemis Heights. The corps, except Regiment Prinz Friedrich (remained at Fort Ticonderoga) and Battalion von Barner, surrendered at Saratoga and became prisoners of war in the Convention Army.

== See also ==
- Frederick Valentine Melsheimer
- August Franz Globensky
