= Heinrich von Breymann =

German army officer

- Born: c. 1725
- Died: 7 October 1777 (aged 52) Stillwater, New York, U.S.
- Allegiance: Duke of Brunswick–Wolfenbuttel
- Rank: Lieutenant Colonel
- Battles: Seven Years' War; American War of Independence; Battle of Bennington; Battle of Bemis Heights †

Friedrich Heinrich Christoph Breymann (c. 1725 – 7 October 1777) was a German military officer of Brunswick–Wolfenbüttel troops who commanded grenadiers in the Northern Theater of the American War of Independence.

== American War of Independence ==
Under the command of British Army officer General John Burgoyne, Breymann fought in the Battle of Bennington and the Battle of Bemis Heights. On 7 October 1777, Breymann's unit was driven behind a redoubt by American troops; he grew frustrated with his own men and began attacking four soldiers with his sabre before Breymann was shot and killed by one of them.
