= Friedrich Adolf Riedesel =

German army officer

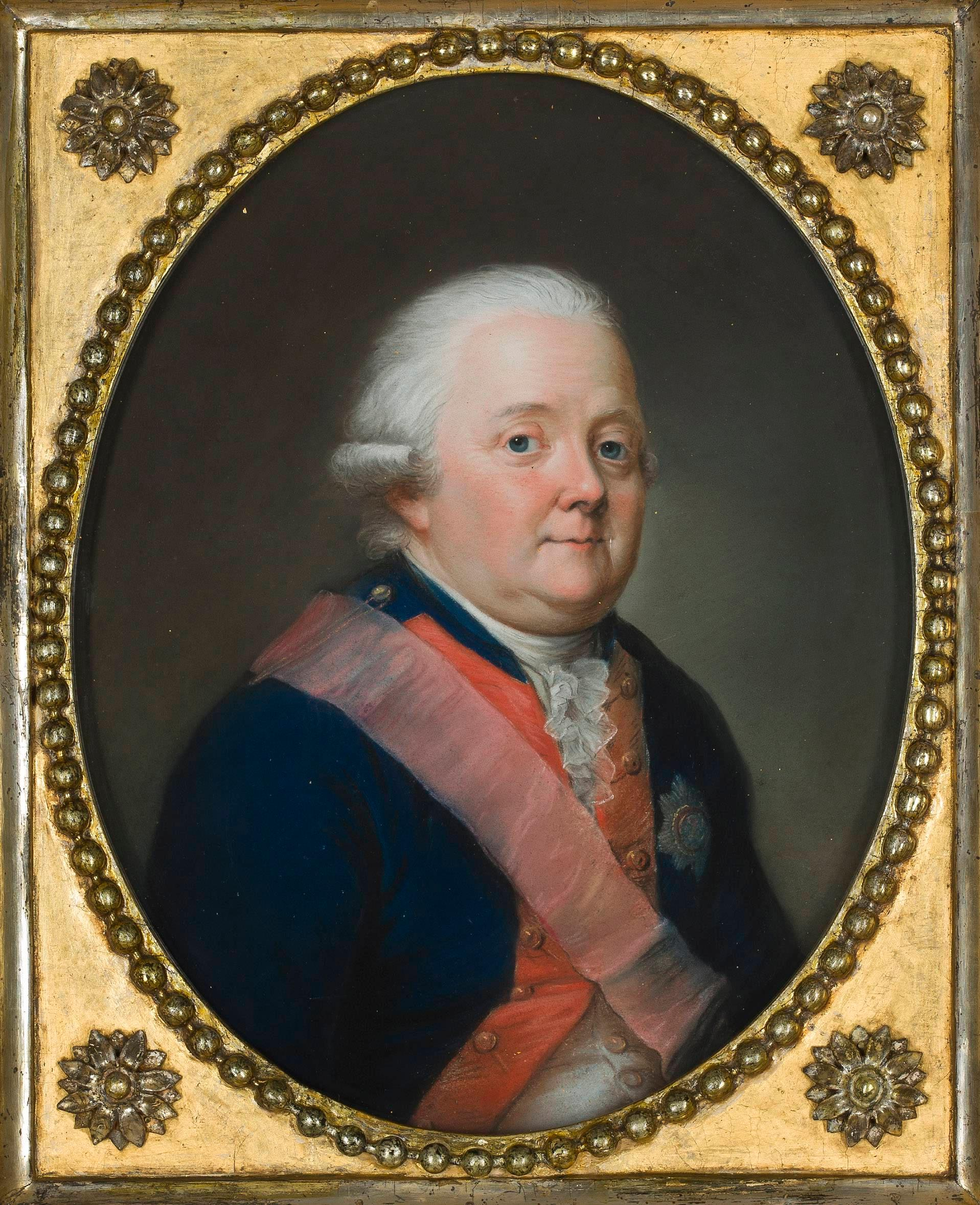
- c. 1795 portrait
- Born: Friedrich Adolf Riedesel zu Eisenbach; June 3, 1738; Lauterbach
- Died: January 6, 1800 (aged 61); Brunswick
- Burial place: Lauterbach
- Education: University of Marburg
- Spouse: Charlotte von Massow (m. 1762)
- Children: 9
- Military career
- Allegiance: Duke of Brunswick–Wolfenbuttel
- Rank: Major general
- Commands: Brunswick Corps
- Battles: Seven Years' War; Battle of Minden; Battle of Nauheim (WIA); American Revolutionary War; Saratoga campaign (POW)

The Baron Friedrich Adolf Riedesel zu Eisenbach (3 June 1738 – 6 January 1800) was a general officer of the Principality of Brunswick-Wolfenbüttel who commanded the Brunswick Corps in the Northern theater of the American War of Independence.

== Early life and education ==
Riedesel was born in Lauterbach, into the Riedesel family of Hessian Uradel barons, the second son of Johann Wilhelm Riedesel, Freiherr zu Eisenbach and Sophia von Borcke. His birth on June 3, 1738 and early education both took place in Lauterbach. The title of "Freiherr" (Baron) was carried by all men of his lineage who reached majority. His parents disagreed about his education; his mother wanted him prepared for a religious career, while his father sought a legal education and diplomatic service. Either of these was a proper career for a younger son.

Bowing to his father's wishes, when 15 years old, he left for the study of law at the University of Marburg. Riedesel was an indifferent student, but spent time watching Hessian troops drill.

== Military career ==
An officer who had seen his interest befriended Riedesel, and later tricked him into enlisting. He was told that his father had consented to his enlistment, so at 17 he joined the Marburg battalion, only to have his allowance cut off when his angry father learned of it. The two were later reconciled, and Friedrich was granted an allowance from his father to help meet his expenses.

=== Seven Years' War ===
Ensign Riedesel's first assignment was near London. Riedesel knew no French nor English, but learned both while in England, and made friends with several English officers that he would later meet in the Americas. The unit was recalled to the Holy Roman Empire in 1756, for what would become the Seven Years' War. Friedrich was attached to the personal staff of Ferdinand, Duke of Brunswick and distinguished himself at the Battle of Minden in 1759. He served for a time (1760) in the Hessian Hussar regiment and had a portrait done wearing their uniform. Riedesel also gained the attention of Frederick the Great, King of Prussia, and by 1761, he was in command of two Brunswicker regiments as their Colonel.

In August 1762, he was wounded in battle against the French, and sent back to Minden to recover. There he was cared for by the von Massow family and nursed by their daughter Charlotte. In December the couple wed at Paderborn and settled in Brunswick's capital city of Wolfenbüttel, where they lived quietly for several years. During these years, Riedesel commuted to Brunswick, where he was adjutant to the duke. He also fathered three daughters: Gustava (1771-1805), Frederica (1774-1854), and Caroline (1776-1861).

=== American War of Independence ===
When the American Revolutionary War broke out in 1775, the British government found itself in need of trained troops to suppress the rebellion. The rulers of Brunswick-Wolfenbüttel came from the Bevern line of the House of Brunswick-Lüneburg, while the British throne was occupied by the Hanover line of the same family. In 1776, Duke Charles I signed a treaty with George III to provide 4,000 foot soldiers and 350 heavy dragoons for British service.

On 18 March, they sailed from Stade with the newly promoted Major General Riedesel as their commander. After a stop over in England, they arrived in Quebec City on 1 June. They supported the final expulsion from Canada of the American forces during the invasion of Canada. They were then distributed for the winter through various posts in Canada.

General Riedesel was put in command of all German (Note: Riedesel's soldiers are mistakenly referred to as "Hessians" by some Americans, but were correctly identified as Brunswickers by their contemporaries.) and American Indian forces during the Saratoga campaign of 1777. His letters to the Duke of Brunswick reveal discontent with British Generals Burgoyne and Howe. One example of Riedesel's disagreements with Burgoyne came after his victory at the Battle of Hubbardton, when rebels under Seth Warner gathered to attack loyalists under Philip Skene at Castle Town, Vermont. General Riedesel had promised protection to the loyalists, and wanted to attack the rebels at once. Burgoyne stalled, however, and ordered Riedesel to continue his advance instead of stopping to fight Warner's militia. General Riedesel warned the Duke of Brunswick that even if the campaign went well, they could not hope to be back to Germany in 1778.

During the campaign, Riedesel showed an ability to adapt to combat in the American wilderness. He issued new orders to his army to attack in open order from cover of trees, and when forced to fight in the open, to close order and immediately charge with the bayonet.

Riedesel’s wife, Frederika Charlotte, became herself a relevant actor. She traveled to Canada with her infant daughters to be with her husband on the campaign. Her Letters and Journals Relating to the War of the American Revolution and the Capture of the German Troops at Saratoga is an important resource for knowledge of the campaign and its key personalities. Her harrowing account of her experiences in what is now known as the Marshall House where her husband had sent her to seek shelter during the closing days of the siege at Saratoga is one of the vivid episodes of the American Revolution.

Riedesel and his wife were captured when General John Burgoyne surrendered after the Battle of Saratoga in 1777. He was imprisoned with the Convention Army in Charlottesville, Virginia at the Albemarle Barracks. They transferred to New York, where General Riedesel spent a year on parole, before being exchanged for American General William Thompson. The Baron commanded troops on Long Island in Winter 1780-81. In 1781, Quebec governor Frederick Haldimand named Riedesel officer in charge of the Sorel District, where he and his family stayed until his departure from North America at the end of Summer 1783. According to Charlotte's diary and local lore, the Riedesels introduced the custom of an illuminated Christmas tree in North America while in Sorel in 1781. (Note: A detailed account of Riedesel's work in Sorel and along the Richelieu River can be found in the Haldimand Collection in the National Archives of Canada (mainly in the series 136 to 139).)

General Riedesel returned to Europe in late 1783, sailing first to England. He led the remainder of his Brunswick troops to a review by Charles William Ferdinand, Duke of Brunswick, who had become the ruler of Brunswick-Wolfenbüttel in 1780, while his army was being held captive in the United States. Riedesel was promoted to Lieutenant-General in 1787, and given command of the Brunswick troops in the southern provinces of Holland.

== Later life and death ==
Riedesel retired in 1793, but was named Commandant of the city of Brunswick. He met John Quincy Adams in 1797, and "made many enquiries about the United States, and in particular after General Schuyler." Riedesel died at Brunswick in 1800.

== Styles ==
Beginning with the publication of the couple's letters from the American Revolution arranged by one of his sons-in-law (von Reuß), the General came to be referred to as "von Riedesel" in American scholarly and popular writing. This is historically incorrect. From its earliest known members in the 13th century down to the present, family members have rarely used the predicate "von" in their name. The patent from Emperor Leopold I in 1680 which raised them to the status of Barons (Freiherren) did not designate them as "von." In the initial volume of the authorized history of the family (1923), the author E. E. Becker clearly states that the Riedesel zu Eisenbach did not use the "von" in their names.

== Issue ==
General Riedesel and Charlotte had the following children, some born in North America:

- Hermann (1767-1767)
- Philippine (1770-1771)
- Auguste (1771-1805); married Count Heinrich von Reuss
- Friederike (1774-1854); married Count Friedrich Wilhelm von Reden
- Caroline (1776-1861); never married
- Amerika (1780-1856); married Count Ernst von Bernsdorff
- Canada (1782-1783)
- Georg Karl (1785-1854); married Caroline Riedesel
- Charlotte (1787-1848); married Wilhelm von Schöning
