= New York regiments =

- 1st New York Regiment
- 2nd New York Regiment
- 3rd New York Regiment
- 4th New York Regiment
- 5th New York Regiment
