= Peter Gansevoort =

American Army Officer (1749–1812)

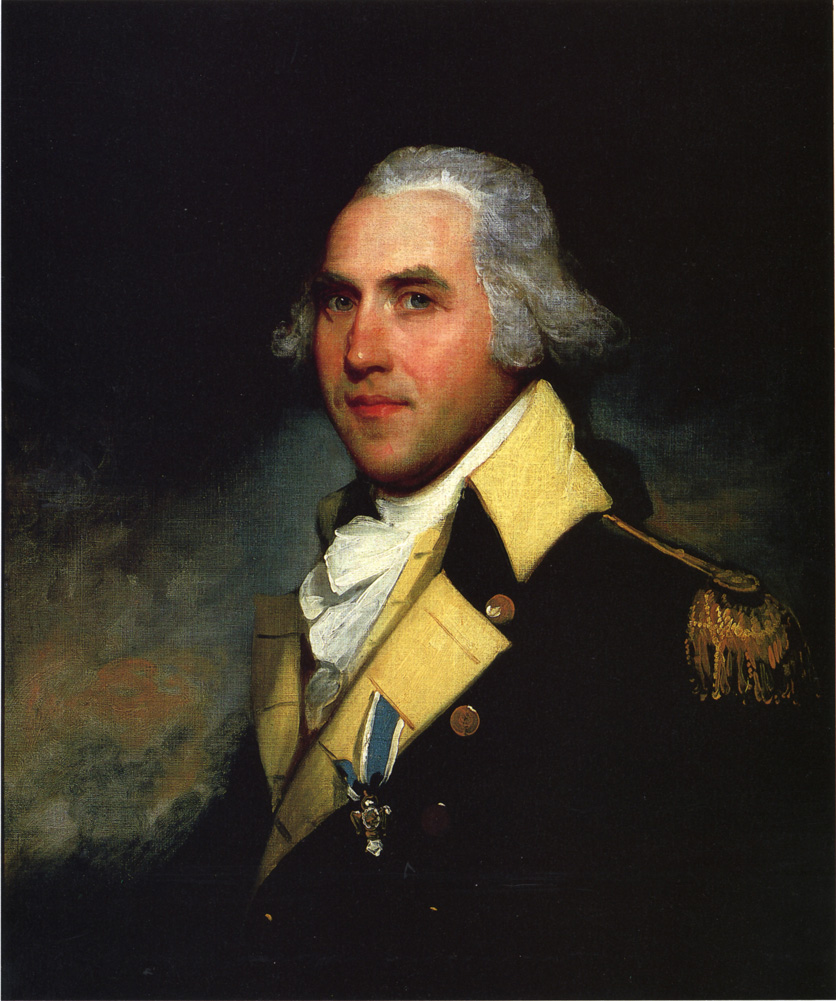
- Portrait of Gansevoort by Gilbert Stuart, 1794

Sheriff of Albany County
- In office 1790

Personal details
- Born: July 17, 1749 Albany, New York, British America
- Died: July 2, 1812 (aged 62) Albany, New York, U.S.
- Resting place: Albany Rural Cemetery, Menands, New York
- Spouse: Catherine Van Schaick (m. 1778)
- Relations: Leonard Gansevoort (brother)
- Children: 6, including Peter
- Parent(s): Harman Gansevoort; Magdalena Douw

Military service
- Allegiance: United States of America
- Branch/service: Albany County militia Continental Army; United States Army
- Years of service: 1775-1809
- Rank: Major general (Militia); Colonel (Continental Army); Brigadier general (US Army)
- Commands: 2nd New York Regiment; 3rd New York Regiment
- Battles/wars: American Revolutionary War; Invasion of Quebec; Siege of Fort St. Jean; Seizure of Fort Chambly; Capture of Montreal; Battle of Oriskany; Sullivan Expedition

Peter Gansevoort (July 17, 1749 – July 2, 1812) was a Colonel in the Continental Army during the American Revolutionary War. He is best known for leading the resistance to Barry St. Leger's Siege of Fort Stanwix in 1777. Gansevoort was also the maternal grandfather of Moby-Dick author Herman Melville.

== Early life ==
Peter Gansevoort was born into the Dutch aristocracy of Albany in the Province of New York. His parents were Harman Gansevoort (1712–1801), the third generation of his family to live in America, and Magdalena Douw (1718–1796). His younger brother was Leonard Gansevoort, who was more active politically, serving in the state assembly and senate, as well as the Continental Congress.

Gansevoort's paternal ancestors had been in Albany since 1660, when it was the Dutch colony of Fort Orange, and Harmen Harmense Gansevoort owned a brewery and farms. Through his mother, he was related to New York's Van Rensselaer family as her mother, and Gansevoort's maternal grandmother, was Anna Van Rensselaer (1696–1756), a daughter of Hendrick van Rensselaer, the director of the Eastern patent of the Rensselaerswyck manor. In addition, his first cousin, Leonard Gansevoort (1754–1834), an Albany lawyer and alderman, was married to Maria Van Rensselaer (1760–1841), the daughter of Col. Kiliaen van Rensselaer (1717–1781), the granddaughter of Hendrick van Rensselaer and the sister of Henry Van Rensselaer (1744–1816), Philip Kiliaen van Rensselaer (1747–1798), and Killian K. Van Rensselaer (1763–1845).

== Career ==
=== American Revolution ===
As the American Revolution grew closer, Peter Gansevoort joined the Albany County militia. While he lacked the experience of many older officers, he was a tactful and persuasive leader. Even at his young age, he was over six feet tall, and had a commanding presence. This, along with his family connections, caused Gen. Philip Schuyler to give him a commission.

=== Invasion of Quebec ===
At the start of the American Revolution, Gansevoort joined the Continental Army. He was commissioned as a Major on June 30, 1775, and served as a field commander in the 2nd New York Regiment. Goose Van Schaick was the regiment's Colonel; he had raised it, and served as its nominal commander. Lieutenant Colonel Peter W. Yates had been the regiment's primary field commander, but remained as commander of Fort George when Major Gansevoort led much of the regiment north with Richard Montgomery's forces for the invasion of Quebec (1775).

Gansevoort led the regiment during the siege of Fort St. Jean, today known by its French name of Fort Saint-Jean. In late October, to improve the effect of the siege, Montgomery sent Gansevoort and his men down the river to seize Fort Chambly. At Chambly, they captured over 120 barrels of needed gunpowder and a huge mortar which they nicknamed the Old Sow. They also took about 100 prisoners of the Welch Fusilier garrison and their young Captain, John André.

Montgomery used the Old Sow to open fire on St. Johns, which was compelled to surrender on November 2, 1775. Gansevoort took part in the capture of Montreal, although he became ill during that attack. He started on the advance to Quebec City, but by the time the force reached Trois-Rivières, he was being carried on a stretcher.

He returned to Montreal and spent the winter as one of the sick with the occupation force. By the spring of 1776, the invasion had fallen apart at Quebec. Montgomery had been killed, and Benedict Arnold had been wounded. Gansevoort had recovered to the point where he led the remaining New York forces south in a fighting withdrawal that stopped the British advance at Lake Champlain. As recognition for his accomplishment, in June 1776, he was assigned to command Fort George.

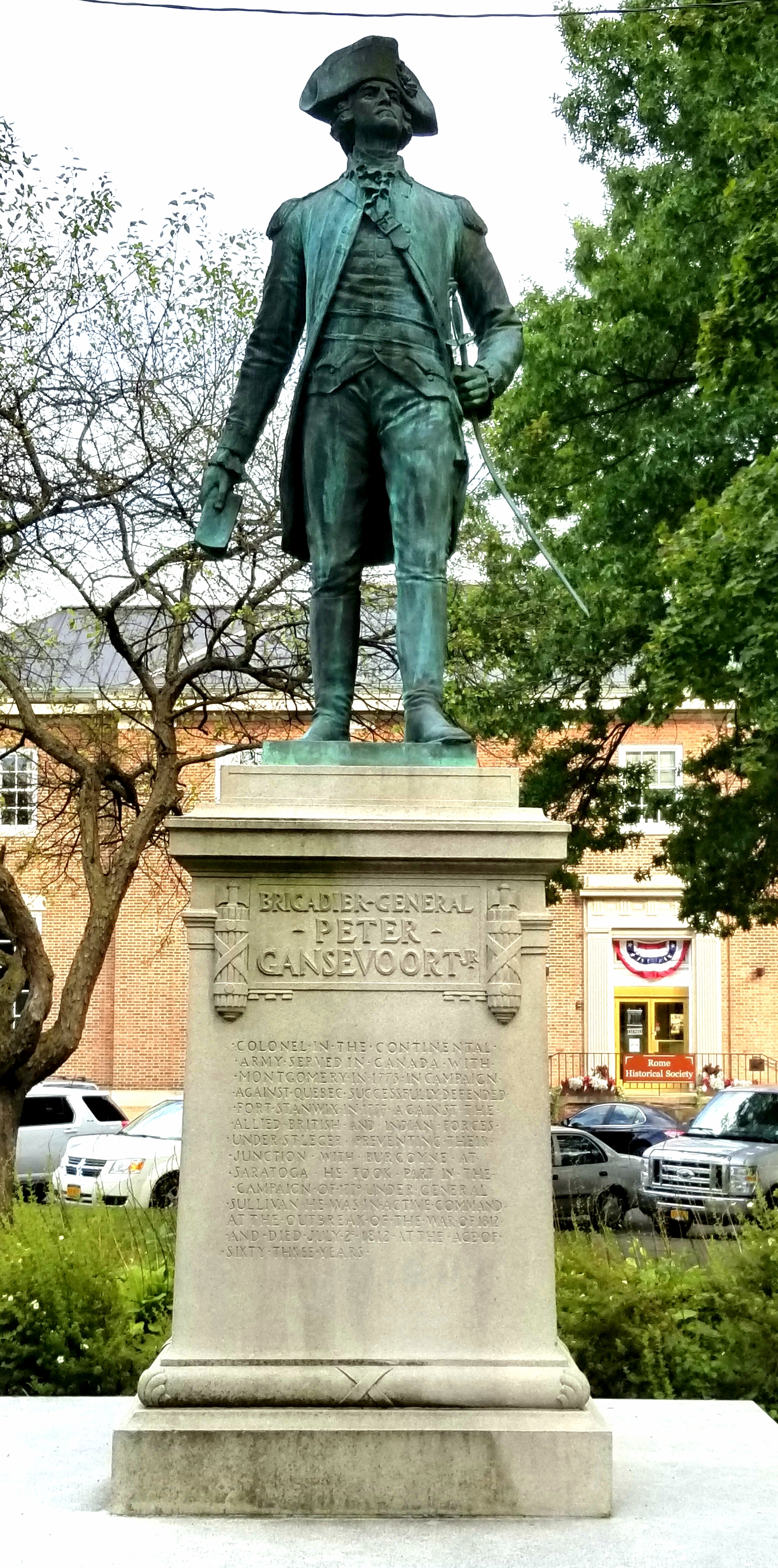
Statue of Peter Gansevoort, Rome, NY

=== Siege of Fort Stanwix ===
In November, Gansevoort was promoted to Colonel and given command of the 3rd New York Regiment. which he recruited and trained in early 1777. Lt. Colonel Marinus Willett became his second in command. His area of responsibility was extended from the Hudson River valley and Fort Edward and Fort George, along the Mohawk River Valley to Fort Oswego in the northwest. This was to be the axis of Colonel Barry St. Leger's attack during the Saratoga campaign.

The 3rd New York did not have the men and equipment to extend that far, even with the support of local militia units. He conceded Fort Oswego to the British, and elected to defend Fort Stanwix (near modern Rome, New York). The fort had been abandoned after the French and Indian War and was in ruins. He and Willett restored the fort and strengthened its defenses. They hurriedly set up a garrison, getting the last boatload of supplies into the fort under fire from St. Leger's advance force on August 2.

He and his more than 700-strong garrison withstood the three-week-long siege, making a sortie on August 6, while much of St. Leger's force was occupied in the Battle of Oriskany. The siege was lifted on August 22, after word arrived that Benedict Arnold was leading a large relief force up the Mohawk Valley.

He received the grateful thanks of the Congress, as John Adams noted that "Gansevoort has proven that it is possible to hold a fort."

=== 1778–1781 ===
Gansevoort eventually turned Fort Stanwix over to a garrison of the 1st New York Regiment. He moved his headquarters to his new command at Fort Saratoga (near modern Schuylerville, New York). He led his regiment in the Sullivan Expedition of 1779. He had another bout of illness that winter (1779–1780) and returned home for a while, but, by July 1780, he was back with the 3rd at West Point. He was assigned to command the New York Brigade, and reestablished his headquarters at Fort Saratoga.

In the reorganization and downsizing of the New York Line in 1781, Gansevoort was left with no assignment in the Continental Army. He returned home and became Brigadier General of the Albany County Militia.

In 1783 he became an Original Member of the New York Society of the Cincinnati.

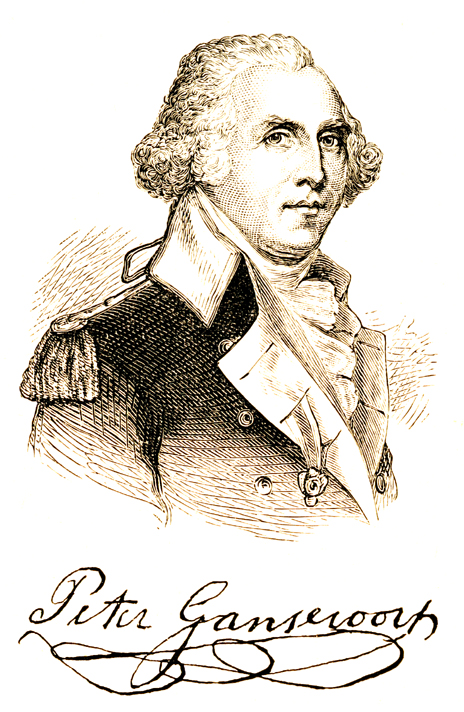

=== Post-Revolution ===
After the war, Gansevoort continued to make his home in Albany where he operated the family brewery. He expanded his farms, adding grist mills and a lumber mill, in the area that eventually became Gansevoort, New York. In 1790, he served for a while as sheriff of Albany County, as a commissioner of Indian affairs, and continued his support of the military in the militia and as a quartermaster. In 1800, he ran for US Senator from New York but was defeated by Gouverneur Morris of the Federalist Party.

In 1809, he was made a Brigadier General in the United States Army and commanded the Army's Northern Department. In 1811, he was called on to preside over the court-martial of General James Wilkinson. Wilkinson was found not guilty, and the court adjourned on Christmas Day. Hurrying back to his family, he suffered a recurrence of his old illness, and he never recovered, dying the next Summer.

== Personal life ==
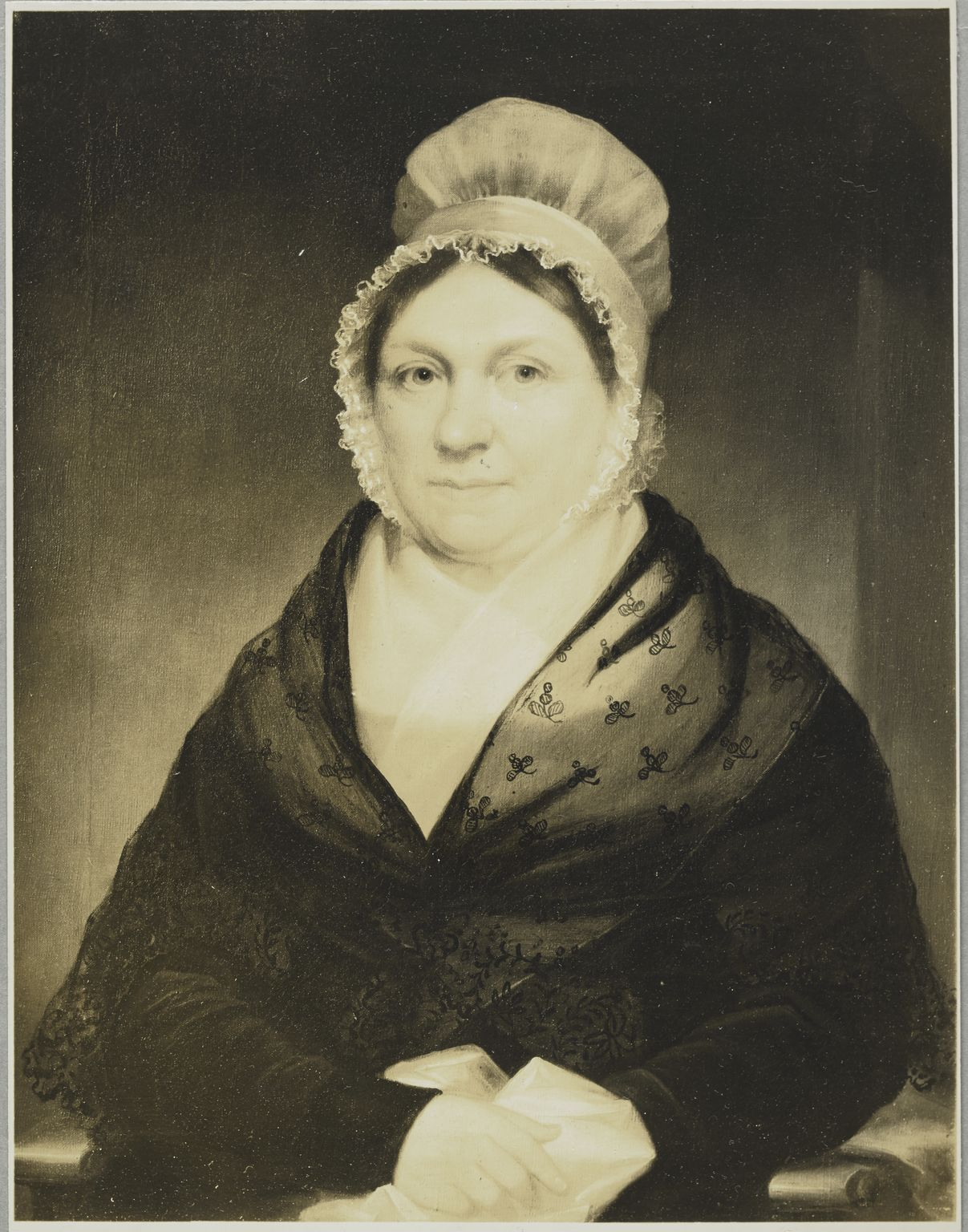
Catherine Van Schaick Gansevoort, portrait by Ezra Ames

On January 12, 1778, he had married Catherine "Katy" Van Schaick (1752–1830) in her family's home on Van Schaick Island, Cohoes, New York. She was the daughter of Wessel and Maria Van Schaik, and her cousin Goose Van Schaick had been Peter's commander and Colonel in 1775. Over the years, they had five children, five of whom lived past infancy, including:

- Herman Gansevoort (1779–1862), who married Catherine S. Quackenbush (1774–1855) in 1813.
- Wessel Gansevoort (1781–1862), who never married.
- Leonard Herman Gansevoort (1783–1821), who married Mary Ann Chandonette (1789–1851)
- Peter Gansevoort (1788–1876), who married Mary Sanford (1814–1841), a daughter of Chancellor Nathan Sandford. After her death, he married Susan Lansing (1804–1874), great-niece of John Lansing Jr., in 1843.
- Maria Gansevoort (1791–1872), who married Allan Melvill (1782–1832), son of Thomas Melvill, in 1814.

He died at home in Albany on July 2, 1812. he is buried at Albany Rural Cemetery.

=== Descendants ===
His grandson through his son Leonard was Guert Gansevoort, who had a distinguished naval career that spanned 45 years. Through his daughter Maria, he was the maternal grandfather of author Herman Melville (1819–1891).

His eldest son, Herman, built the Gansevoort Mansion in 1813 on his father's 1,500 acres (6.1 km^{2}) tract at Gansevoort in Saratoga County, New York. The house was added to the National Register of Historic Places in 1976.
