= 4th New York Regiment =

- New York Line troops in 1775
- Active: 25 May 1775–1 January 1781
- Allegiance: Continental Congress of the United States
- Type: Infantry
- Size: 720 Men
- Part of: New York Line
- Nickname: Weissenfel's Regiment
- Engagements: American Revolutionary War: New York Campaign; Battle of Saratoga; Battle of Monmouth; Sullivan Expedition

Commanders
- Notable commanders: Colonel James Holmes; Colonel Cornelius Wynkoop; Colonel Henry Beekman Livingston; Frederick, Baron de Weissenfels Frederick Heinrich von Weissenfels

The 4th New York Regiment was one of four established by the New York Provincial Congress at the direction of the Continental Congress for the defense of King's Bridge where Manhattan Island joins the mainland, and of the Hudson River. The regiment would see action in the Invasion of Canada, New York Campaign, Battle of Saratoga, Battle of Monmouth and the Sullivan Expedition. The regiment was merged into the 2nd NY on January 1, 1781.

== Initial organization ==
After the Capture of Fort Ticonderoga on May 10, 1775, by Ethan Allen, it became apparent that it was unlikely to be a peaceful settlement with Britain in the foreseeable future. On May 25, the Continental Congress, requested New England and New York to raise troops for a campaign into Canada. The New York Provincial Congress authorized the raising of four Regiments totaling 3,000 soldiers to serve under the command of major general Philip Schuyler until December 31. Schuyler was in charge of the troops in New York, which constituted the North Department. Former British officer Richard Montgomery was named brigadier general. It was anticipated the Montgomery's combat experience would complement Schuyler administrative and logistical skills.

The 1st New York Regiment, under the command of Colonel Alexander McDougall was raised in New York City; the 2nd New York Regiment, under Colonel Goose Van Schaick at Albany; the 3rd New York Regiment, under Colonel James Clinton from the west bank of the Hudson; and, the 4th, under Colonel James Holmes from the east side of the river.

While Washington dealt with the British in Boston, Schuyler was to undertake an invasion of Canada. The troops were to receive uniforms in Albany, but the Provisional Congress overestimated the merchants' available stock of cloth required, and having headed north so soon after forming, there were only enough for the first two regiments raised. The 4th received only regimental short coats. In August 1775, Philip Van Cortlandt described many of the men of the 4th wanting shirts, shoes, stockings, underclothes, and, in short, without anything fit for a soldier except a uniform coat. Arming the troops also proved challenging. More of the muskets, bayonets, ramrods, etc. had been supplied to the 1st and 2nd, leaving Holmes without enough to supply a company. The colony did not have sufficient material to supply so many soldiers.

Washington assigned colonel Henry Knox to retrieve the British artillery from Ticonderoga and bring it to Boston. He wrote that "no trouble or expense must be spared to obtain them." On November 16, Washington wrote to Schuyler requesting that he assist Knox in the endeavor. The 4th, the least equipped regiment, was posted along an area from Albany to Lake George (New York) to maintain essential lines for supplies and communication. Those at Ticonderoga provided the main manpower to enable Knox to move the cannons and munitions. During the Invasion of Quebec in late 1775, General Schuyler became too ill to continue and turned command of the expedition over to Montgomery. Montgomery was killed during an assault on Quebec City in December 1775.

The second establishment of the regiment was authorized on January 19, 1776.

== Saratoga ==
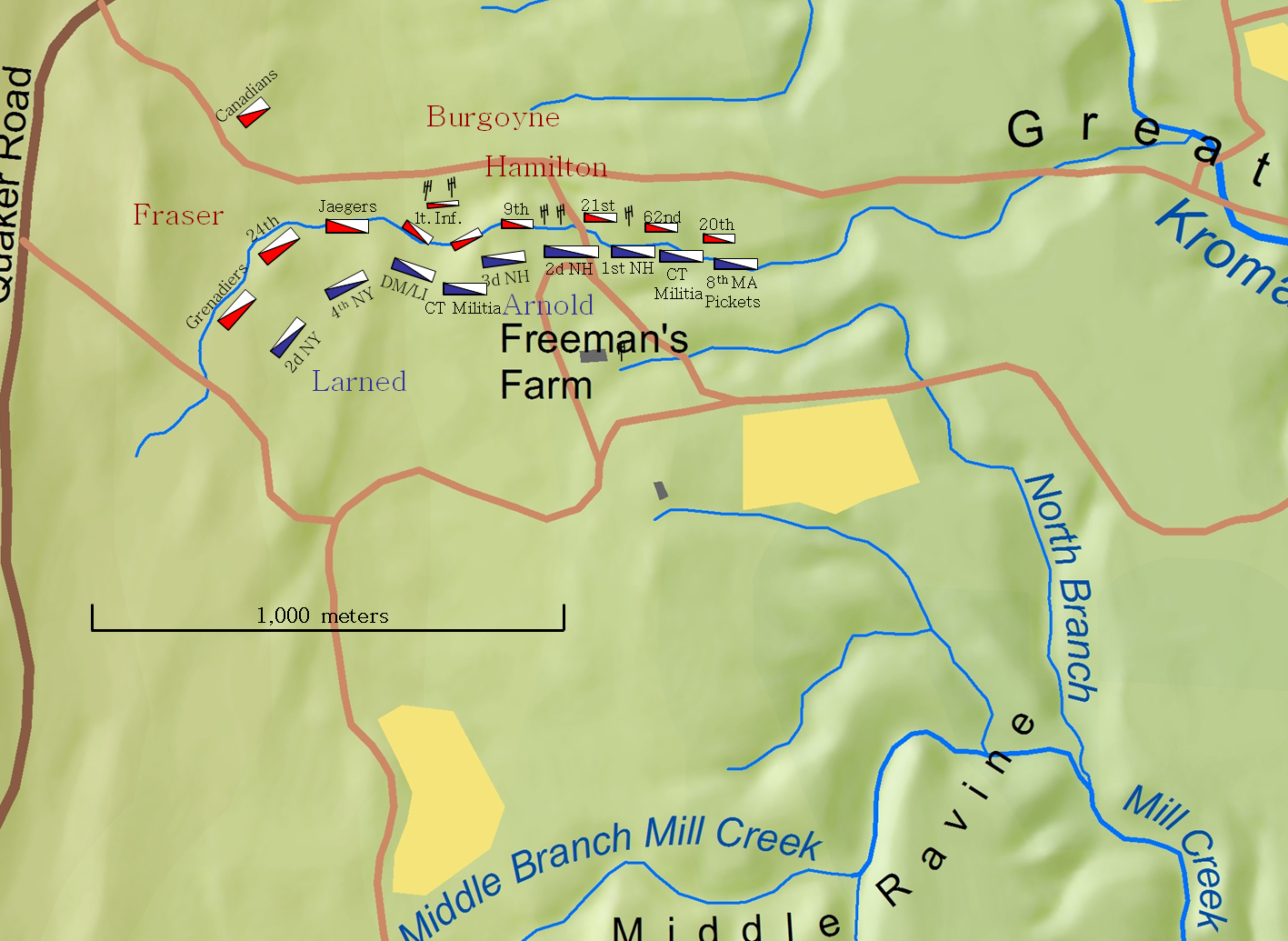
Array of Units on the Freeman's Farm Battlefield

In August 1777, the 4th New York, which was under Colonel Henry Beekman Livingston, was attached to Enoch Poor's brigade at Loudon's Ferry, not far from Van Schaick Island. By mid-September, they were at Saratoga, where they came to the aid of Daniel Morgan's rifleman at Freeman's Farm on September 19. On October 7, they were in General Gates' left wing. The regiment spent the following winter at Valley Forge.

Coming out of winter quarters, the Americans met the British at Monmouth Courthouse in June 1778. The 4th regiment, still part of Poor's brigade, was put in the main line of defense, while Col. Beekman was detached to lead a hand-picked battalion in the vanguard.

Frederick von Weissenfels Frederick, Baron de Weissenfels became Lt. Colonel Commanding of the 4th New York on January 13, 1779, and remained in that post until the unit was reduced by the State of New York on January 1, 1780. The 4th New York was known during the war as Weissenfel's Regiment.

== Sources ==
- Fernow, Berthold, New York in the Revolution, 1887
- Heitman, Francis B., Historical Register of Officers of the Continental Army during the War of the Revolution. New, enlarged, and revised edition., Washington, D.C.: Rare Book Shop Publishing Company, 1914
- Wright, Robert, The Continental Army, 1983
