= 1800 United States Senate special elections in New York =

In 1800, there were two special elections for the U.S. Senate from New York:

- April 1800 United States Senate special election in New York
- November 1800 United States Senate special election in New York
