= Lewis DuBois =

Lewis DuBois (1744 – March 4, 1824) was an American Revolutionary War commander. A descendant of Louis Dubois, who founded the early Huguenot settlement of New Paltz, which is preserved today as Historic Huguenot Street (Huguenot Street Historic District). Before the Revolutionary War, DuBois was a carpenter working in Poughkeepsie, New York.

== Early life ==
DuBois is often confused with multiple cousins who share the same name. Louis DuBois was a popular name in the family due to the family's patriarch, Louis Du Bois (1626–1696), who came to the United States after fleeing religious persecution in France. Lewis was born in early 1744, and baptized on September 9, 1744 in Fishkill, New York. His father, Elias, was born in 1722 in Ulster County, New York, and his mother, Susannah Vanderburgh, born in 1725 in Poughkeepsie, New York. At some point, Lewis's father moved from Ulster County to Dutchess County.

Elias's father was Louis DuBois (b. 1697), son of Mattheus DuBois (1679-1748) and his wife, Sara Van Keuren (1678-1748). The father of Mattheus is the aforementioned Louis, first of the DuBois family to the United States. His second cousin, once removed, Colonel Louis J. DuBois (1733-1813), is one of the most common cousins that Lewis is confused with, as they both had nearly identical war records.

== Military career ==
He enlisted in the Provincial Militia in 1762 at the age of 18.

On June 28, 1775, he was commissioned as a Captain and directed to form a Company from Dutchess County to become a part of Colonel James Clinton's 3rd New York Regiment in the Canadian Campaign. Within a year of his commission, on June 21, 1776, he was made a full colonel and began raising the 5th New York Regiment. He was taken prisoner at Fort Montgomery October 6, 1777.

Colonel DuBois resigned his commission on December 22, 1779, but by 1780 he was commanding a regiment of New York Levies, fighting in the Mohawk Valley of New York. After the war, he was promoted to brigadier general and commanded the Dutchess County Militia from 1787 to 1793.

== Later civilian career ==
DuBois was sheriff of Dutchess County from 1781 to 1785, and served in the State Assembly in 1786 and 1787.
