= 5th New York Regiment =

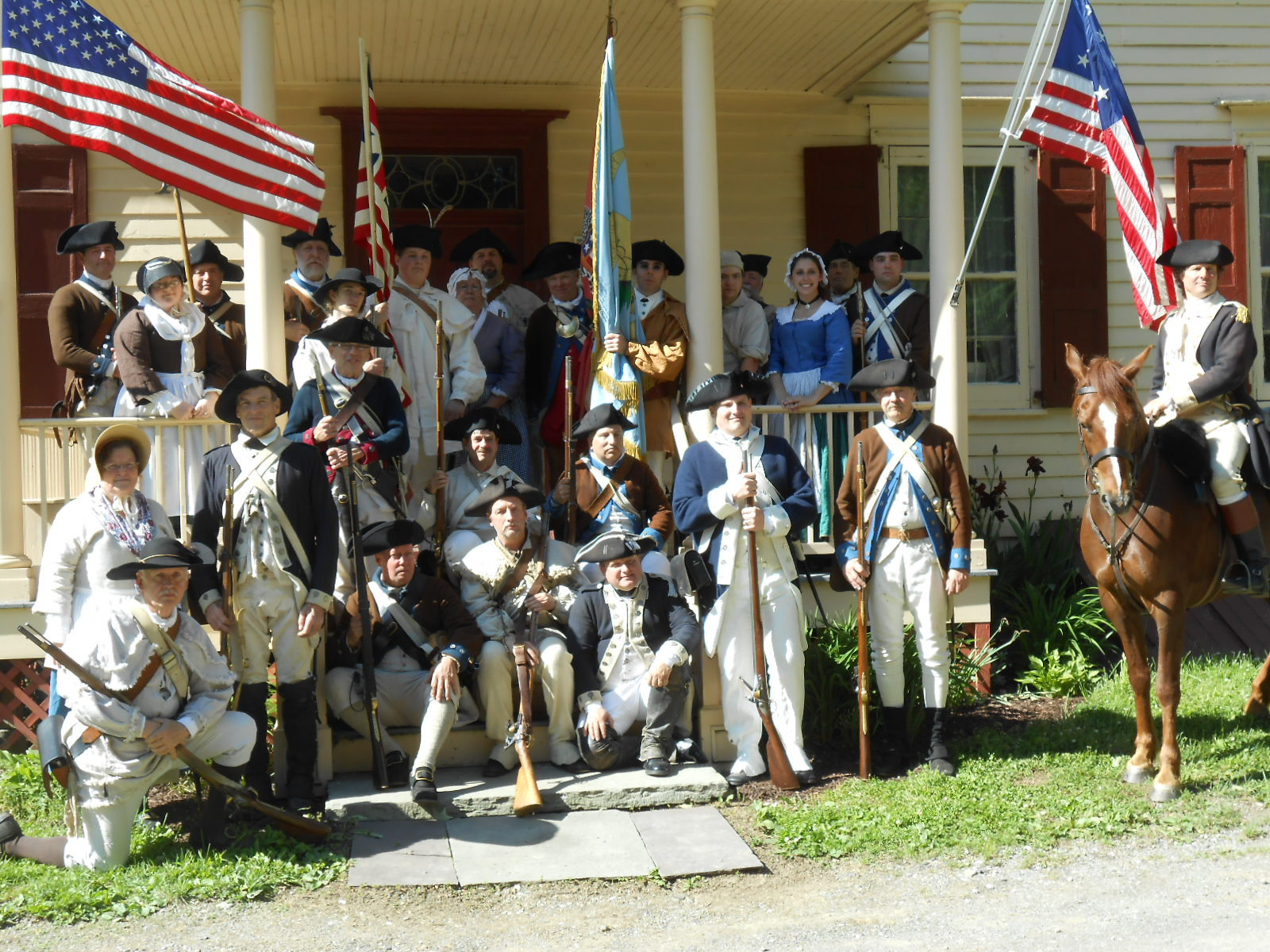
- Fishkill Supply Depot
- Active: 1777–1781
- Allegiance: Continental Congress of the United States
- Type: Infantry
- Part of: New York Line
- Engagements: The Battles of Fort Montgomery and Fort Clinton The Battle of Newtown Sullivan Expedition

Commanders
- Notable commanders: Lewis DuBois; Marinus Willett

The 5th New York Regiment was authorized on November 30, 1776, as part of the New York Line for service with the Continental Army, under Colonel Lewis DuBois. It was organized January 26, 1777, from companies in central New York and assigned to the Highlands Department.

The 5th New York was badly mauled at the Battle of Fort Montgomery and Fort Clinton October 6, 1777, with near two-thirds their number killed or captured after a grueling day-long battle.

The regiment would see further action in the Hudson Highlands and the Sullivan Expedition.

The regiment would be merged into the 2nd New York Regiment on January 1, 1781, alongside the 4th New York Regiment.

== Legacy ==
In 2001, a living history regiment reenacting the 5th New York Regiment was raised in Orange County, NY. The reenactment 5th New York Regiment is currently active all throughout the Hudson Valley and based at its home garrison, Fort Montgomery.

== Sources ==
- Heitman, Francis B. (1914). Historical Register of Officers of the Continental Army during the War of the Revolution: April, 1775 to December, 1783. Washington, D.C.: The Rare Book Shop Publishing Company, Inc. – via Internet Archive.
- Mayers, Robert A. (2009). The War Man: the True Story of a Citizen-Soldier Who Fought from Quebec to Yorktown. Yardley, PA: Westholme Publishing, LLC. ISBN 978-1-59416-082-0 – via Internet Archive.
- Williams, Glenn F. (2005). Year of the Hangman: George Washington's Campaign Against the Iriquois. Yardley, PA: Westholme Publishing, LLC. ISBN 1-59416-013-9 – via Internet Archive.
- Wright, Jr., Robert K. (1983). The Continental Army. Army Lineage. Washington, D.C.: United States Army Center of Military History. LCCN 82-16472 – via Internet Archive.
- 5th New York Regiment’s website, 2013
