= Rudolphus Ritzema =

Colonel Rudolphus Ritzema (1739–1803) was an American officer in the New York Line during the American Revolutionary War, and later changed sides, serving as a lieutenant colonel in a British regiment.

He was born to the Reverend Johannes Ritzema and Hiltje Dijkstra in Kollum, a village in the Friesland province of the Dutch Republic. The family moved to America in 1744. Ritzema attended King's College, which would later become Columbia University, where he was one of the first to graduate, in July 1758. He went from there to study divinity in the Netherlands, but was uninterested, and ended up enlisting in the Prussian army, where he likely saw service in the Seven Years' War. After that war he returned to New York, where he studied and practiced law.

When the revolution broke out in 1775, he became a member of the Committee of Sixty and the Committee of One Hundred in New York City.

On June 30, 1775, he was appointed lieutenant colonel of the 1st New York Regiment. In July he seized British armaments in New York City. On November 28, 1775, he was appointed colonel of the 3rd New York Regiment on the recommendation of General Richard Montgomery replacing Alexander McDougall who had not accompanied his regiment to the field. He took part in the Battle of Quebec and believed one of the reasons for Montgomery's rush into battle was the pending enlistment terminations involving Benedict Arnold's forces.

His regiment was next assigned to the defense of New York, and placed in Lord Stirling's brigade. According to charges filed by Stirling, Ritzema was lax in maintaining order and discipline in his regiment, which was two hours late for a parade review on July 1, 1776. Stirling placed Ritzema on report, in response to which Ritzema is alleged to have used disrespectful language. While he was subjected to a court martial over the slight, Ritzema was cleared when Stirling chose to overlook the slight. The bad blood appears to have continued, for by November 1776, possibly during or after the Battle of White Plains, Ritzema deserted and joined the British Army. In May 1778, as a lieutenant colonel in the British army, he raised a few companies of an organization called the Royal American Reformers. These companies were either demobilized or reassigned in December, and Ritzema was put on half pay.

He died in May 1803 in Starcross, Devon, England. He had four children.
