= 3rd New York Regiment =

- New York Line troops in 1775
- Active: 1775–1780
- Allegiance: Continental Congress of the United States
- Type: Infantry
- Part of: New York Line
- Engagements: New York the Sullivan Expedition

Commanders
- Notable commanders: Colonel James Clinton, Colonel Rudolphus Ritzema; Colonel Peter Gansevoort; Frederick von Weissenfels

The 3rd New York Regiment was authorized May 25, 1775, and organized from June 28 to August 4 from the counties of Ulster, Dutchess, Orange, and Suffolk under the command of Colonel James Clinton for five months service in Canada. The enlistments of the first establishment ended on December 31, 1775.

The second establishment of the regiment was authorized on January 19, 1776. The regiment was reraised between February and May 1776 at Albany, New York, for service with the Continental Army under Colonel Rudolphus Ritzema.

Lt. Colonel Frederick von Weissenfels became the commander of the 3rd New York at the Battle of White Plains on October 28, 1776, after Colonel Rudolphus Ritzema was absent without leave. The 3rd New York was part Alexander McDougal's brigade defending Chatterton Hill.

The regiment was raised for the third time in December, 1776 under the command of Peter Gansevoort.

The regiment would see action in the Invasion of Canada, New York Campaign, Fort Stanwix. It was relieved from Fort Stanwix in November, 1778 and took part in the Sullivan Expedition. During the winter of 1779 - 1780 it encamped with the New York Brigade at Morristown, New Jersey, where it took part in a raid on Staten Island. The regiment was merged into the 1st New York Regiment, on January 1, 1781.
