= April 1800 United States Senate special election in New York =

- April 3, 1800
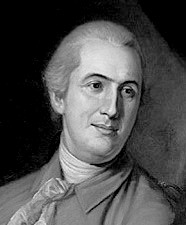

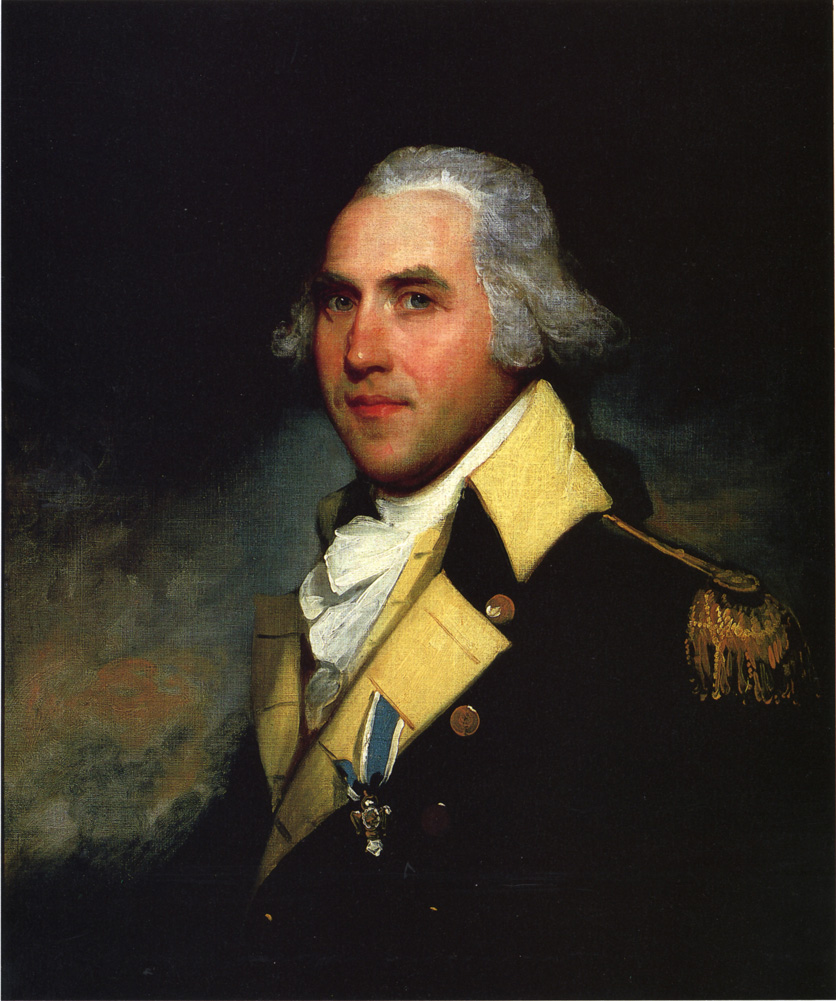
Nominee	Gouverneur Morris	Peter Gansevoort
Party	Federalist	Democratic-Republican
Leg. vote	25 (Senate); 54 (Assembly)	11 (Senate); 48 (Assembly)
Percentage	57.24%	42.76%
Senator before election
James Watson
Federalist
Elected Senator
Gouverneur Morris
Federalist

The first 1800 United States Senate special election in New York was held on April 3, 1800, by the New York State Legislature to elect a U.S. senator (Class 1) to represent the State of New York in the United States Senate.

== Background ==
Federalist John Sloss Hobart had been elected in January 1798 for the remainder of Philip Schuyler's term (1797–1803) but had resigned on April 16 after his appointment to the United States District Court for the District of New York. Federalist William North was appointed by Governor John Jay to fill the vacancy temporarily, and took his seat on May 21, Congress being in session until July 16, 1798. At the next meeting of the State Legislature, James Watson was elected instead of North, took his seat on December 11, 1798, but resigned on March 19, 1800, after his appointment as Naval Officer of the Port of New York.

At the State election in April 1799, Federalist majorities were elected to both houses of the 23rd New York State Legislature which met from January 28 to April 8, 1800, at Albany, New York.

== Candidates ==
Ex-U.S. Minister to France (in office 1792–1794) Gouverneur Morris was the candidate of the Federalist Party.

Gen. Peter Gansevoort was the candidate of the Democratic-Republican Party.

== Result ==
Morris was the choice of both the State Senate and the State Assembly, and was declared elected.

April 1800 United States Senator special election result
Office	House	Federalist		Democratic-Republican	
U.S. Senator	State Senate (43 members)	Gouverneur Morris	25	Peter Gansevoort	11
	State Assembly (107 members)	Gouverneur Morris	54	Peter Gansevoort	48

== Aftermath ==
Morris took his seat on May 3, 1800, being the fifth holder of this seat in a single term (1797–1803), a record which still stands after more than 200 years.

== Sources ==
- The New York Civil List compiled in 1858 (see: pg. 63 for U.S. Senators; pg. 117 for State Senators 1799–1800; page 173 for Members of Assembly 1799–1800)
- Members of the 6th United States Congress
- History of Political Parties in the State of New-York by Jabez Delano Hammond (page 134)
- Election result at Tufts University Library project "A New Nation Votes"
