= Battles of Saratoga =

Part of the American Revolutionary War

- Part of the Saratoga campaign in the Northern Theater of the American Revolutionary War
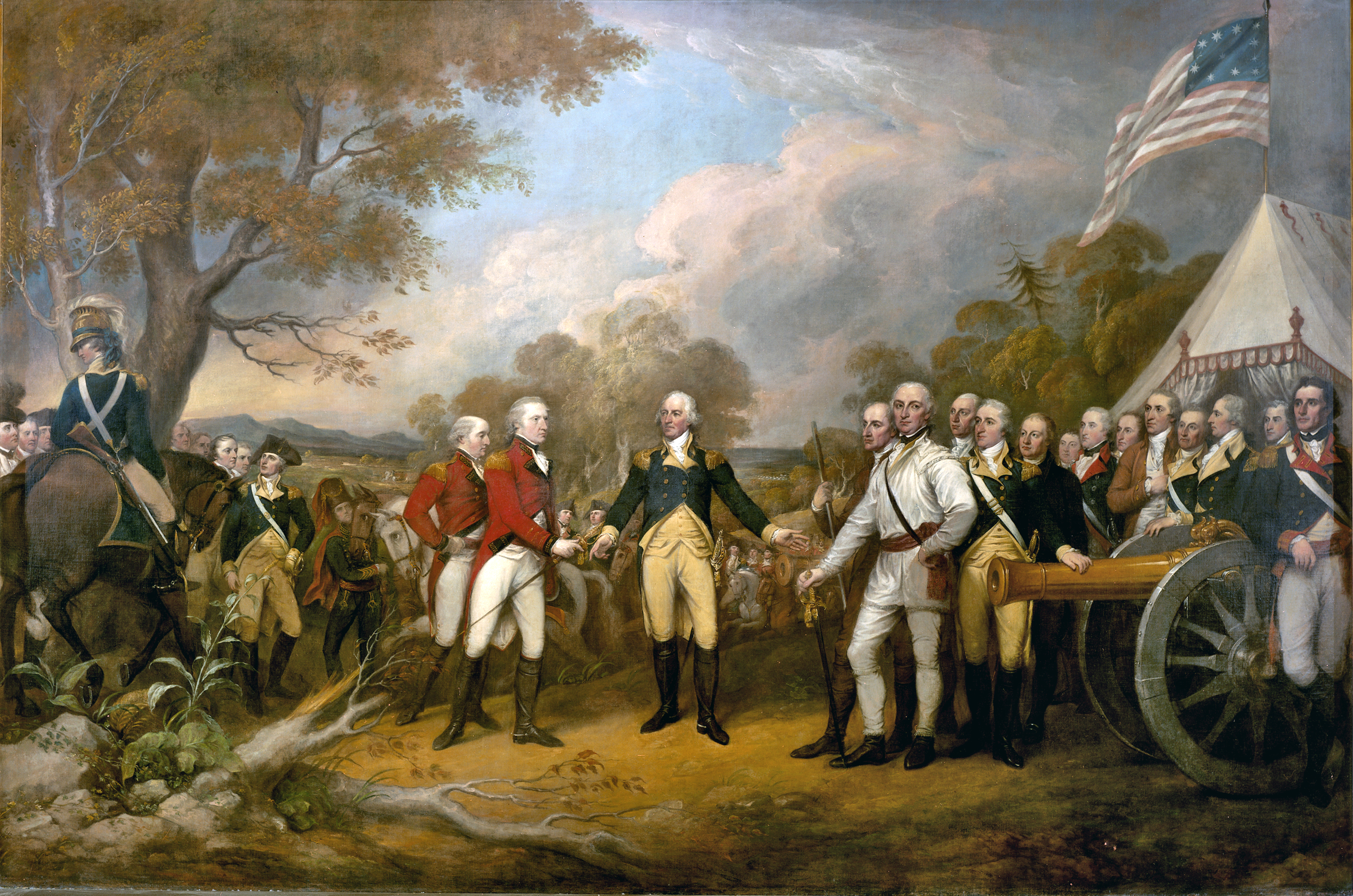
- Surrender of General Burgoyne (1821)
Date	September 19 and October 7, 1777
Location	Stillwater, New York 42°59′56″N 73°38′15″W
Result	American victory: Freeman's Farm: British victory; Bemis Heights: American victory; Burgoyne's surrender: October 17

Belligerents
United States	Great Britain; (Kingdom of Great Britain) Quebec; Loyalists; Hesse-Kassel; Hesse-Hanau; Brunswick-Lüneburg

Commanders and leaders
Horatio Gates; Benedict Arnold (WIA); Benjamin Lincoln; Enoch Poor; Ebenezer Learned; Daniel Morgan; James Livingston; William Whipple	(Kingdom of Great Britain) John Burgoyne (surrendered) (Kingdom of Great Britain) Simon Fraser † (Kingdom of Great Britain) William Phillips (POW); Friedrich Adolf Riedesel (POW); Heinrich von Breymann †

Strength
9,000 (first battle); 12,000+ (second battle); 15,000+ (at time of surrender)	7,200 (first battle); 6,600 (second battle)

Casualties and losses
90 killed 240 wounded	440 killed 695 wounded 6,222 captured

The Battles of Saratoga were fought September 19 and October 7, 1777 over the same ground by the American Continental Army and the British Army near Saratoga, New York during the American Revolutionary War. The second battle was a decisive American victory, with the entire British force taken captive. The outcome greatly affected the course of the war, persuading France to enter the conflict as an American ally in 1778. In both battles, General John Burgoyne served as the British commander, while Generals Horatio Gates and Benedict Arnold oversaw the American forces. Historian Edmund Morgan described Saratoga as "a great turning point of the war, because it won for Americans the foreign assistance which was the last element needed for victory."

The British Army's campaign in New York aimed to divide New England from the middle and southern colonies. Burgoyne led an invasion army southward from Quebec, Canada with the goal of taking Albany, New York in coordination with General William Howe and Brig. General Barry St. Leger. The strategy began promisingly, but stalled due to logistical issues. Howe never moved his forces north, and St. Leger turned back his forces meant to arrive from the west, leaving Burgoyne surrounded by the Americans in upstate New York, 15 miles (24 km) short of his goal. Burgoyne fought two battles, 18 days apart, on the same ground 9 miles (14 km) south of Saratoga, New York. In the first battle, at Freeman's Farm on September 19, Burgoyne won a tactical victory over the Continental Army at the cost of heavy casualties. (Note: Attributed to several references:) The battle began with Burgoyne's attempt to flank the entrenched American position on Bemis Heights with some of his troops. American Major General Benedict Arnold anticipated the maneuver and placed significant forces in his way. Still, Burgoyne was able to gain the field. Skirmishes continued in the following days while Burgoyne waited in the hope that reinforcements would arrive from New York City.

Meanwhile, patriot militia forces continued to arrive, swelling the American ranks. Within the American camp, disputes over tactical decisions led Gates to strip Arnold of his command. Once it became apparent that the British would not receive aid in time, Burgoyne attacked again in the Battle of Bemis Heights on October 7 but lost both the battle and his earlier gains. Culminating in heavy fighting, this battle was marked by Arnold's spirited rallying of the American troops. Burgoyne's forces were thrown back to the positions they held before the action of September 19, and the Americans captured a portion of the entrenched British defenses.

Following this loss, Burgoyne was compelled to retreat to Saratoga (now Schuylerville). Finding himself surrounded by a much larger force, he surrendered his entire army to General Gates on October 17. Although British General Sir Henry Clinton moved up from New York City, attempting to divert American attention by capturing Forts Clinton and Montgomery in the Hudson River highlands on October 6, and Kingston on October 13, these efforts were too late to save Burgoyne. News of the surrender at Saratoga was instrumental in formally creating the Franco-American Alliance, although France had already been clandestinely providing supplies, ammunition, and guns, notably the Vallière cannon which played an important role in Saratoga.

== Background ==
The American Revolutionary War was approaching the two-year point. The British decided to split the Thirteen Colonies and isolate New England from what they believed to be the more Loyalist middle and southern colonies. The British command devised a plan to divide the colonies with a three-way pincer movement in 1777. The western pincer under the command of Barry St. Leger was to progress from Ontario through western New York, following the Mohawk River, and the southern pincer was to progress up the Hudson River valley from New York City. The northern pincer was to proceed southward from Montreal, and the three forces were to meet in the vicinity of Albany, New York, severing New England from the other colonies.

=== British situation ===
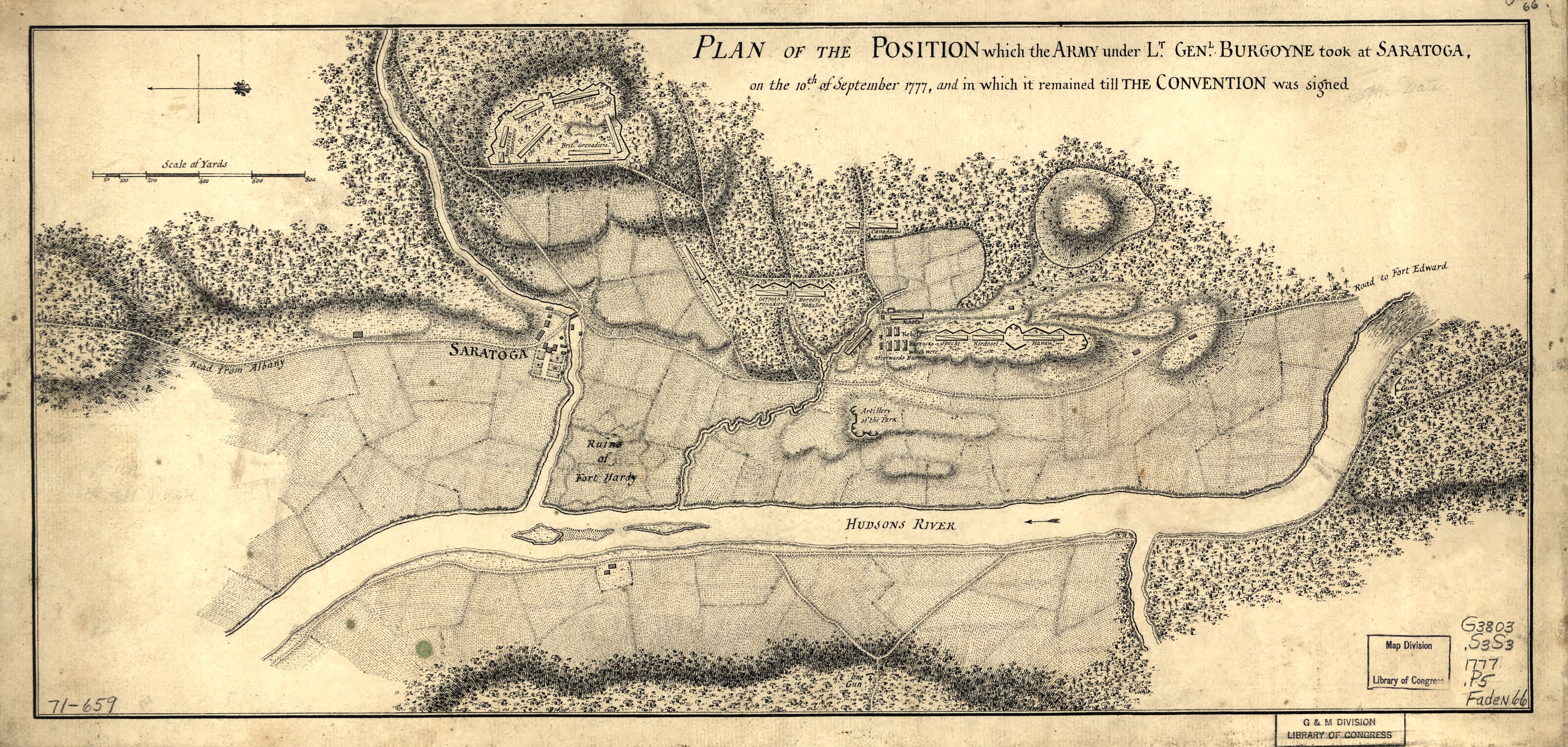
Position of Continental General John Burgoyne's forces, September 10, 1777

British Lieutenant General John Burgoyne moved south from the province of Quebec in June 1777 to gain control of the upper Hudson River valley. His campaign had become bogged down in difficulties following the British victory at Fort Ticonderoga. Elements of the army had reached the upper Hudson as early as the end of July, but logistical and supply difficulties delayed the main army at Fort Edward. One attempt to alleviate these difficulties failed when nearly 1,000 men were killed or captured at the August 16 Battle of Bennington. Furthermore, news reached Burgoyne on August 28 that St. Leger's expedition down the Mohawk River valley had turned back after the failed Siege of Fort Stanwix.

General William Howe had taken his army from New York City by sea on a campaign to capture Philadelphia instead of moving north to meet Burgoyne. Most of Burgoyne's Indian support had fled following the loss at Bennington, and his situation was becoming difficult. He needed to reach defensible winter quarters, requiring either retreat back to Ticonderoga or advance to Albany, and he decided to advance. He then deliberately cut communications to the north so that he would not need to maintain a chain of heavily fortified outposts between his position and Ticonderoga, and he decided to cross the Hudson River while he was in a relatively strong position. He ordered Baron Riedesel, who commanded the rear of the army, to abandon outposts from Skenesboro south, and then had the army cross the Hudson just north of Saratoga between September 13 and 15.

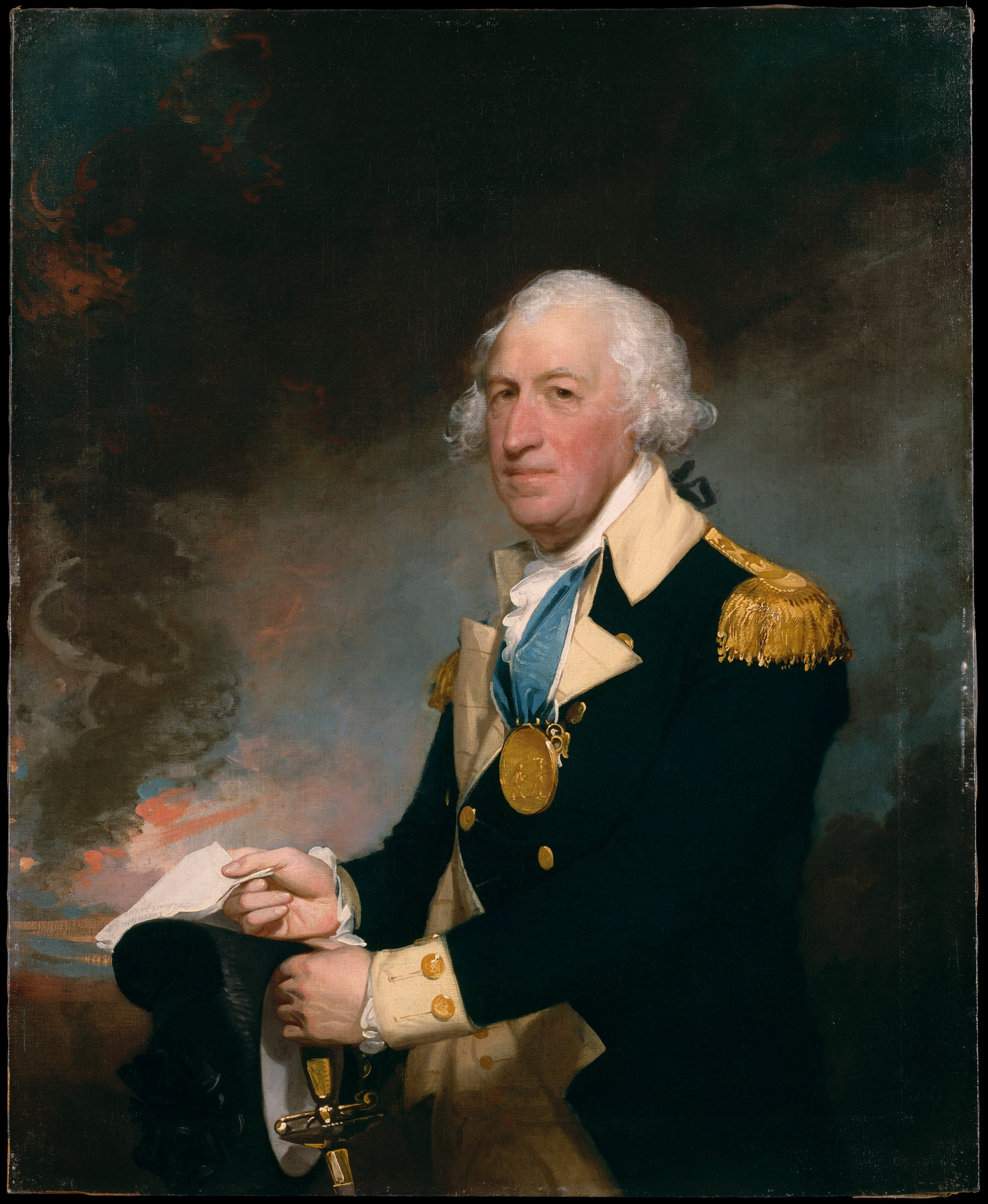
Portrait of Horatio Gates by Gilbert Stuart, 1794

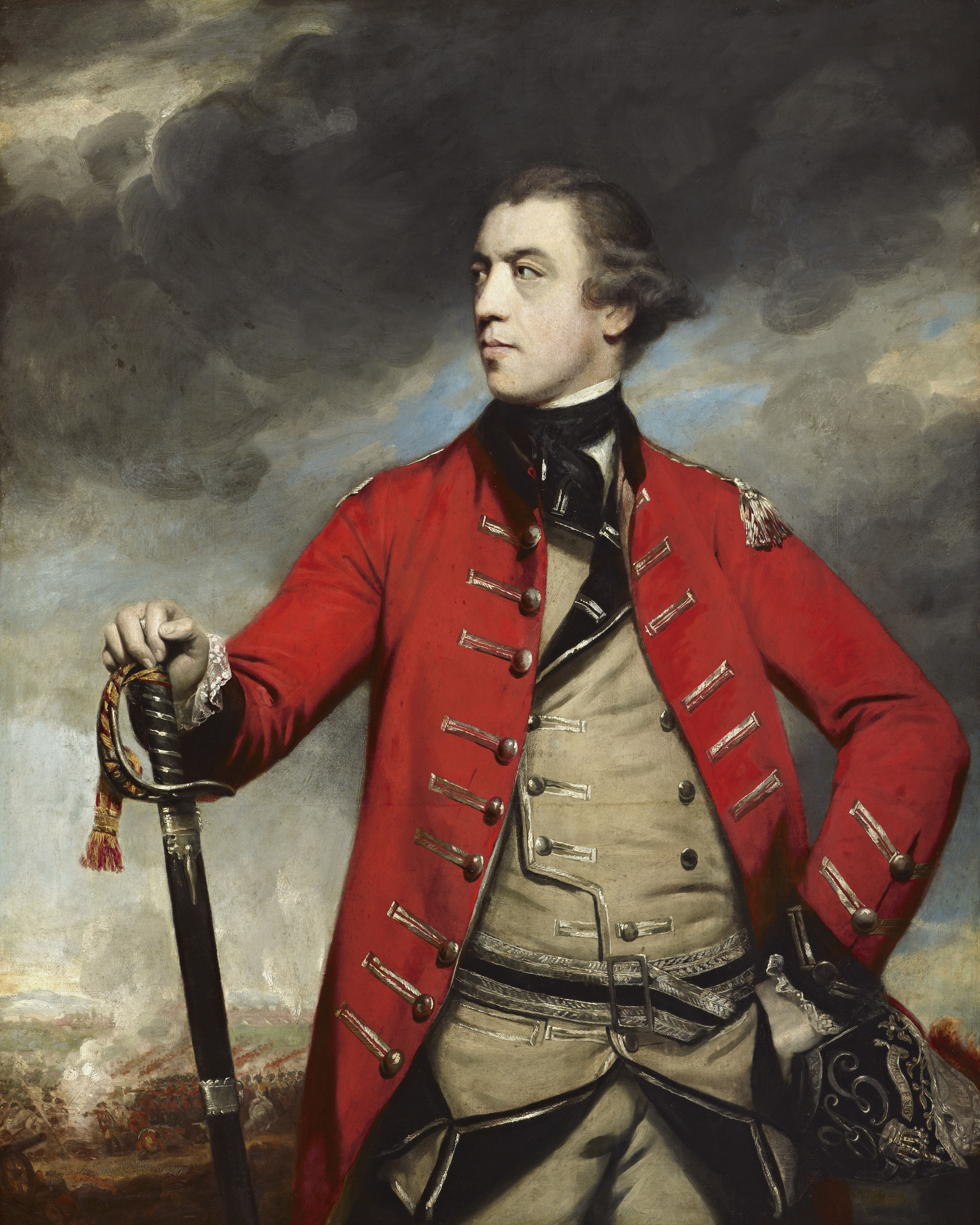
Portrait of John Burgoyne (Note: Referred to by some as "Gentleman Johnny" for his manners) by Sir Joshua Reynolds, 1766

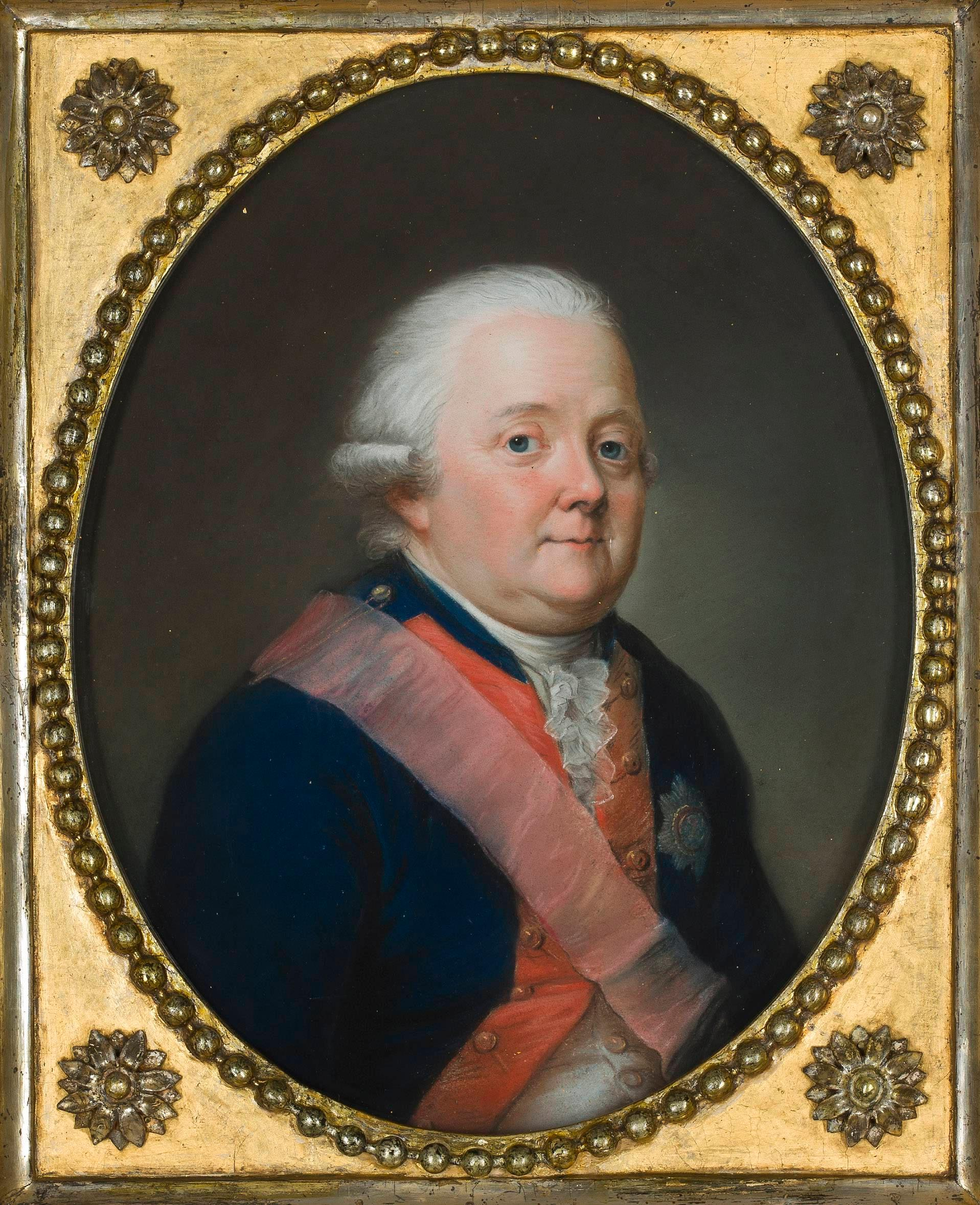
Portrait of Friedrich Adolf Riedesel, c. 1795

=== American situation ===
The Continental Army had been in a slow retreat since Burgoyne's capture of Ticonderoga early in July, under the command of Major General Philip Schuyler, and was encamped south of Stillwater, New York. On August 19, Major General Horatio Gates assumed command from Schuyler, whose political fortunes had fallen over the loss of Ticonderoga and the ensuing retreat. Gates and Schuyler were from very different backgrounds and did not get along with each other. They had previously argued over command issues in the army's Northern Department. The army was growing in size because of increased militia turnout following calls by state governors, the success at Bennington, and widespread outrage over the slaying of Jane McCrea, the fiancée of a Loyalist in Burgoyne's army by Indians under Burgoyne's command. This massive outpouring of militia continued as the battle progressed (and Burgoyne had no way of obtaining reinforcements). This sealed Burgoyne's fate. By the end of the battle, Burgoyne's army totaled 5,791, and the effective colonial force was about 12,000 men.

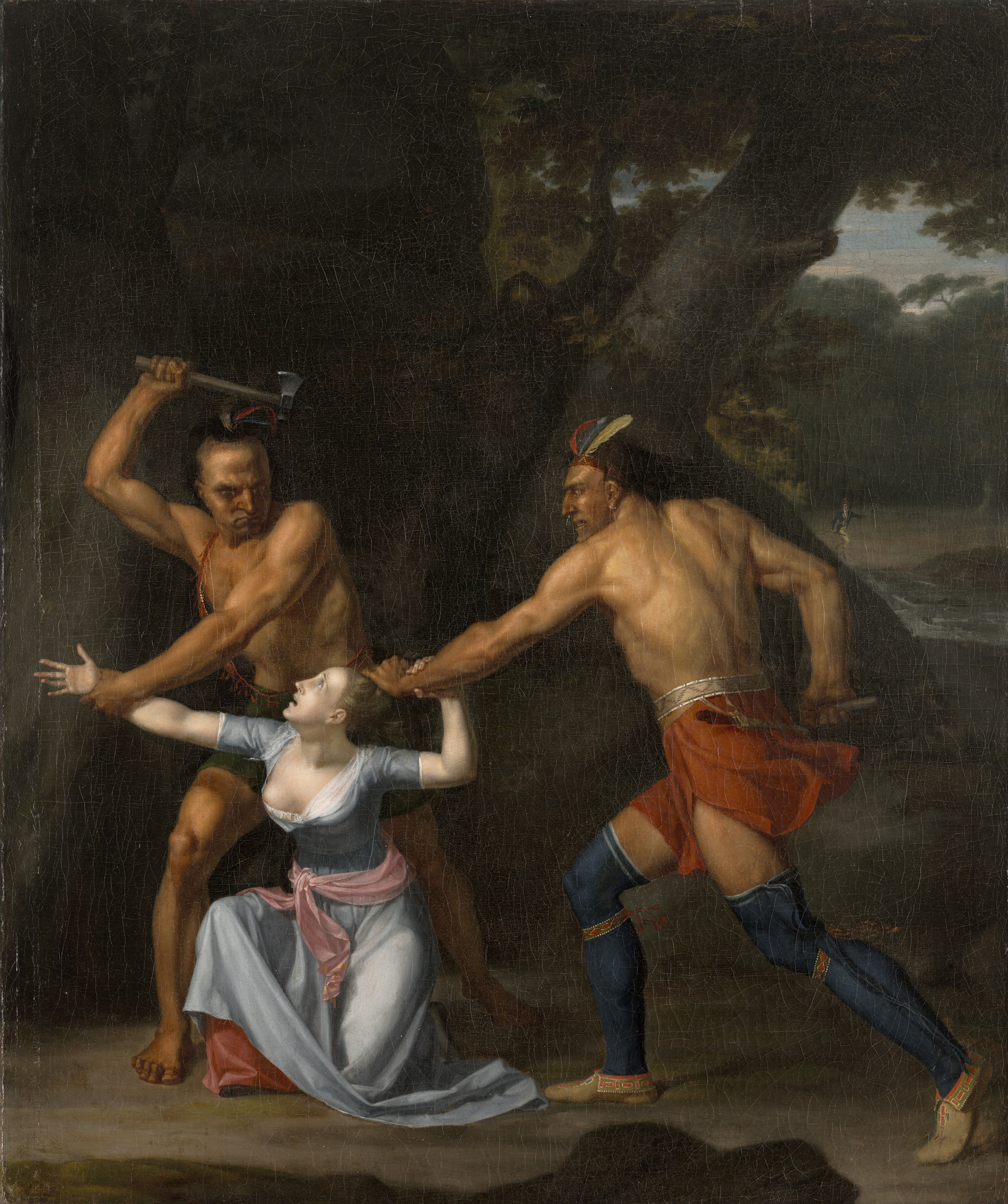
The Death of Jane McCrea by John Vanderlyn. The slaying of Jane McCrea by Native Americans under Burgoyne's command was widely published in newspapers throughout the colonies. This led to a massive turnout of colonial militia, outnumbering Burgoyne's army by two to one.

General George Washington's strategic decisions also improved the situation for Gates' army. Washington was most concerned about the movements of General Howe. He was aware that Burgoyne was also moving, and he took some risks in July. He sent aid north in the form of Major General Benedict Arnold, his most aggressive field commander, and Major General Benjamin Lincoln, a Massachusetts man noted for his influence with the New England militia. He ordered 750 men from Israel Putnam's forces defending the New York highlands to join Gates' army in August, before he was certain that Howe had indeed sailed south. He also sent some of the best forces from his own army: Colonel Daniel Morgan and the newly formed Provisional Rifle Corps, which comprised about 500 specially selected riflemen from Pennsylvania, Maryland, and Virginia, chosen for their sharpshooting ability. This unit came to be known as Morgan's Riflemen.

Map showing the movements of the opposing armies in the Saratoga campaign, and plan of the Battles of Saratoga (inset)

On September 7, Gates ordered his army to march north. A site was selected for its defensive potential that was known as Bemis Heights, just north of Stillwater and about 10 miles (16 km) south of Saratoga; the army spent about a week constructing defensive works designed by Polish engineer Tadeusz Kościuszko. The heights had a clear view of the area and commanded the only road to Albany, where it passed through a defile between the heights and the Hudson River. To the west of the heights lay more heavily forested bluffs that would present a significant challenge to any heavily equipped army.

== First Saratoga: Battle of Freeman's Farm (September 19) ==
=== Prelude ===
Moving very cautiously, since the departure of his Native American support had deprived him of reliable reports on the American position, Burgoyne advanced to the south after crossing the Hudson. On September 18, the vanguard of his army had finally reached a position just north of Saratoga, about 4 miles (6.4 km) from the American defensive line, and skirmishes occurred between American scouting parties and the leading elements of his army.

The American camp had become a bed of rising intrigue ever since Arnold's return from Fort Stanwix. While he and Gates had previously been on reasonably good terms in spite of their prickly egos, Arnold managed to turn Gates against him by taking on officers friendly to Schuyler as staff, dragging him into the ongoing feud between the two. These conditions had not yet reached a boil on September 19, but the day's events contributed to the situation. Gates had assigned the left wing of the defenses to Arnold, and assumed command himself of the right, which was nominally assigned to General Lincoln, whom Gates had detached in August with some troops to harass the British positions behind Burgoyne's army.

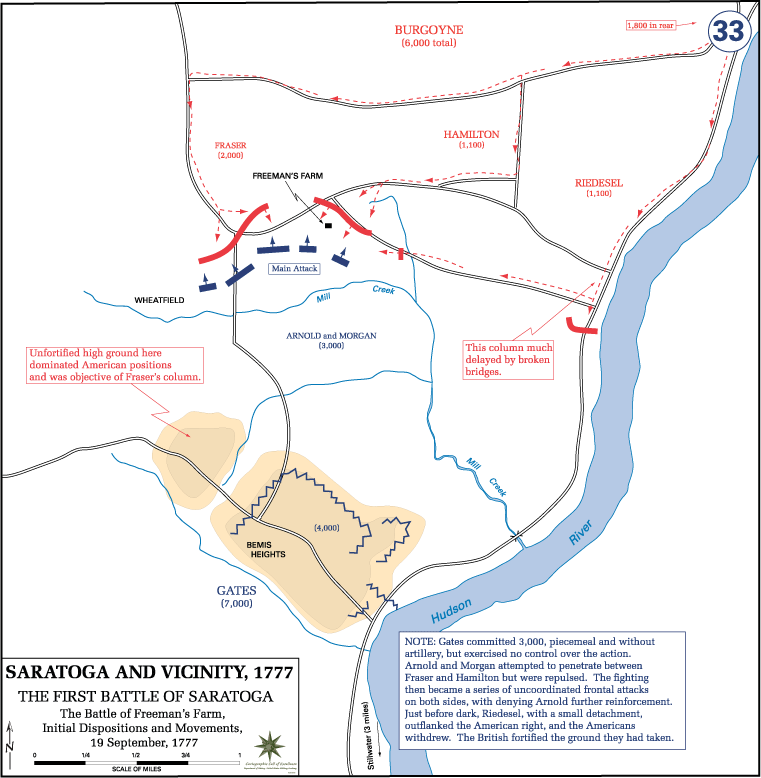
Initial dispositions and movements at the Battle of Freeman's Farm, 19 September 1777

Both Burgoyne and Arnold understood the importance of the American left, and the need to control the heights there. After the morning fog lifted around 10 am, Burgoyne ordered the army to advance in three columns. Baron Riedesel led the left column, consisting of the German troops and the 47th Foot, on the river road, bringing the main artillery and guarding supplies and the boats on the river. General James Inglis Hamilton commanded the center column, consisting of the 9th, 20th, 21st, and 62nd regiments, which would attack the heights, and General Simon Fraser led the right wing with the 24th Regiment and the light infantry and grenadier companies, to turn the American left flank by negotiating the heavily wooded high ground north and west of Bemis Heights.

Arnold also realized such a flanking maneuver was likely, and petitioned Gates for permission to move his forces from the heights to meet potential movements, where the American skill at woodlands combat would be at an advantage. Gates, whose preferred strategy was to sit and wait for the expected frontal assault, grudgingly permitted a reconnaissance in force consisting of Daniel Morgan's men and Henry Dearborn's light infantry. When Morgan's men reached an open field northwest of Bemis Heights belonging to Loyalist John Freeman, they spotted British advance troops in the field. Fraser's column was slightly delayed and had not yet reached the field, while Hamilton's column had also made its way across a ravine and was approaching the field from the east through dense forest and difficult terrain. Riedesel's force, while it was on the road, was delayed by obstacles thrown down by the Americans. The sound of gunfire to the west prompted Riedesel to send some of his artillery down a track in that direction. The troops Morgan's men saw were an advance company from Hamilton's column.

=== Battle ===
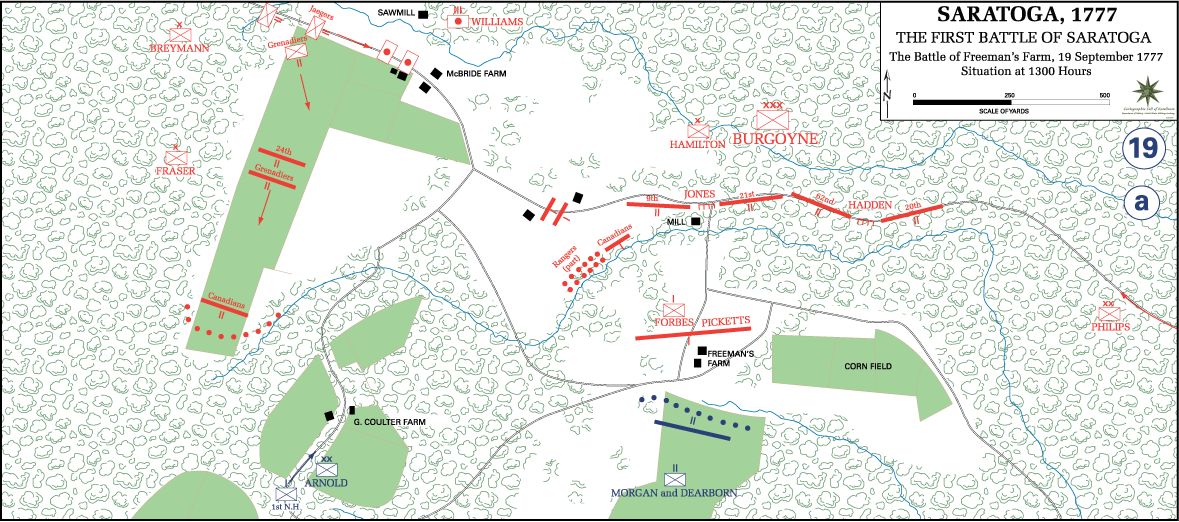
Map depicting the positions at 1:00 pm

Morgan placed marksmen at strategic positions, who then picked off virtually every officer in the advance company. Morgan and his men then charged, unaware that they were headed directly for Burgoyne's main army. While they succeeded in driving back the advance company, Fraser's leading edge arrived just in time to attack Morgan's left, scattering his men back into the woods. James Wilkinson, who had ridden forward to observe the fire, returned to the American camp for reinforcements. As the British company fell back toward the main column, the leading edge of that column opened fire, killing a number of their own men.

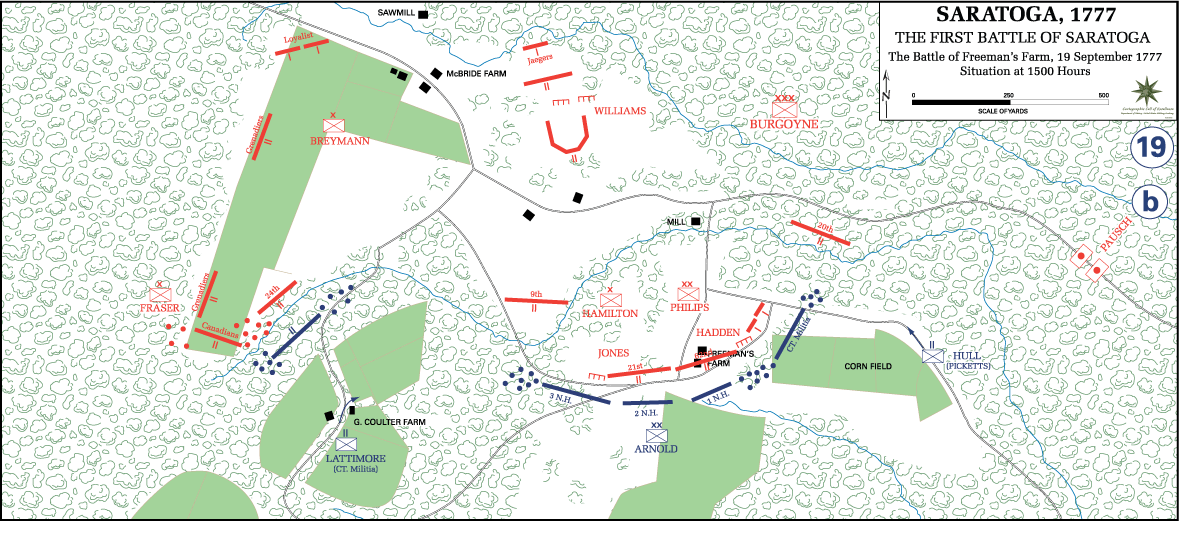
Map depicting the positions at 3:00 pm

There was then a lull in the fighting around 1:00 pm as Hamilton's men began to form up on the north side of the field, and American reinforcements began to arrive from the south. Learning that Morgan was in trouble, Gates ordered out two more regiments (1st and 3rd New Hampshire) to support him, with additional regiments (2nd New York, 4th New York, the 1st Canadian, and Connecticut militia) from the brigade of Enoch Poor to follow. Burgoyne arrayed Hamilton's men with the 21st on the right, the 20th on the left, and the 62nd in the center, with the 9th held in reserve.

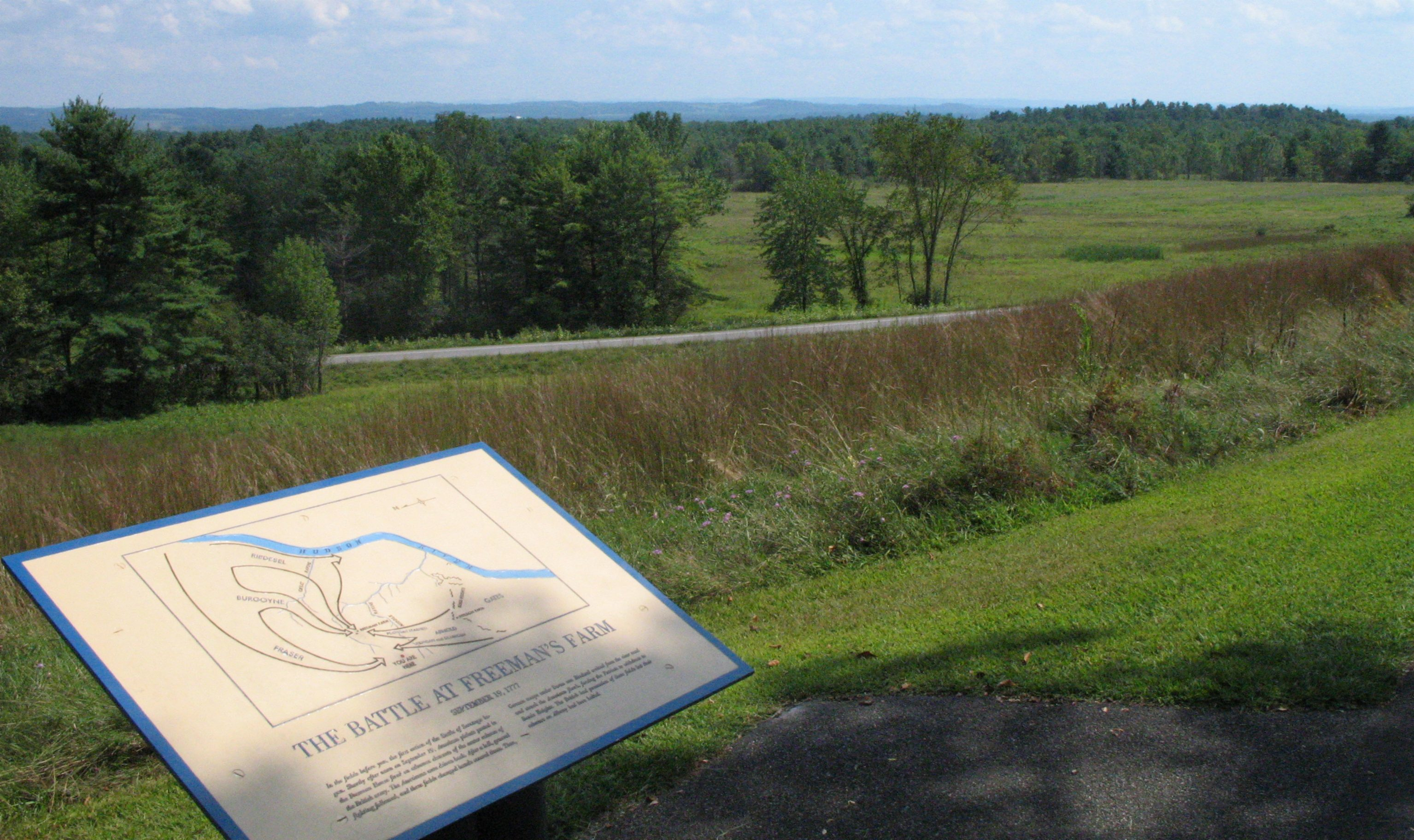
Modern view of the battleground of Freeman's Farm

The battle then went through phases alternating between intense fighting and breaks in the action. Morgan's men had regrouped in the woods, and picked off officers and artillerymen. They were so effective at reducing the latter that the Americans several times gained brief control of British field pieces, only to lose them in the next British charge. At one point it was believed that Burgoyne himself had been taken down by a sharpshooter; it was instead one of Burgoyne's aides, riding a richly dressed horse, who was the victim. The center of the British line was very nearly broken at one point, and only the intervention of General Phillips, leading the 20th, made it possible for the 62nd to reform. In the memoir of Roger Lamb, a British soldier present at the battle, he wrote

In this battle an unusual number of officers fell, as our army abounded with young men of respectability at this time, who after several years of general peace anterior to the American revolution, were attracted to the profession of arms. Three subalterns of the 20th regiment on this occasion, the oldest of whom did not exceed the age of seventeen years, were buried together

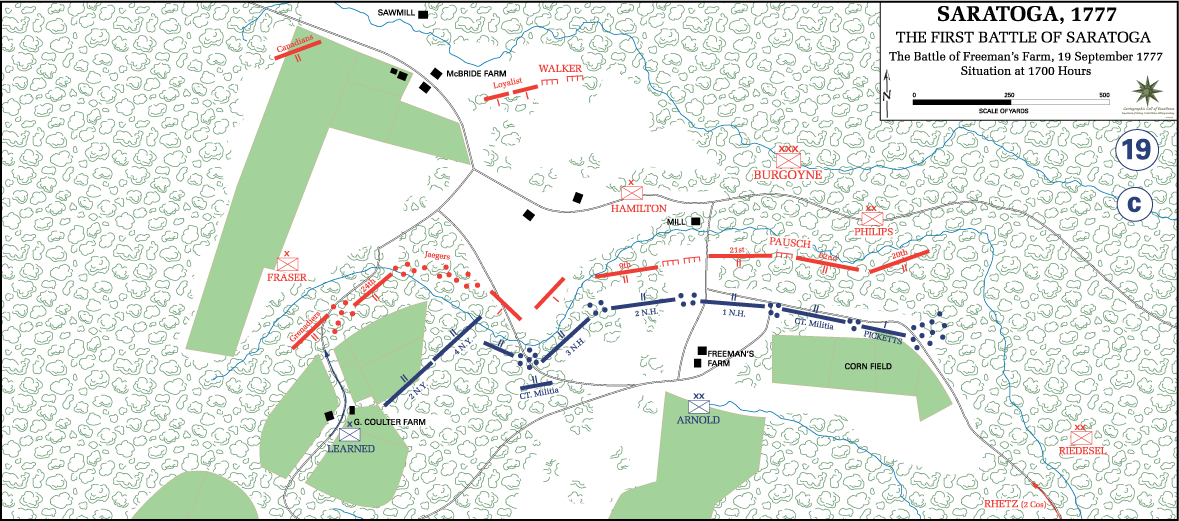
Map depicting the positions at 5:00 pm

The final stroke of the battle belonged to the British. Around 3 pm, Riedesel sent a messenger to Burgoyne for instructions. He returned two hours later with orders to guard the baggage train, but also to send as many men as he could spare toward the American right flank. In a calculated risk, Riedesel left 500 men to guard the vital supply train and marched off toward the action with the rest of his column. Two of his companies advanced on the double and opened vicious fire on the American right, and Fraser's force threatened to turn the American left flank. In response to the latter threat, Arnold requested more forces, and Gates allowed him to dispatch Ebenezer Learned's brigade (2nd, 8th and 9th Massachusetts). (If Arnold had been on the field, these forces might have instead faced the larger danger posed by Riedesel's force.) Fortunately for the American right, darkness set in, bringing an end to the battle. The Americans retreated back to their defenses, leaving the British on the field.

Burgoyne had gained the field of battle, but suffered nearly 600 casualties. Most of these were to Hamilton's center column, where the 62nd was reduced to the size of a single company, and three quarters of the artillerymen were killed or wounded. American losses were nearly 300 killed and seriously wounded.

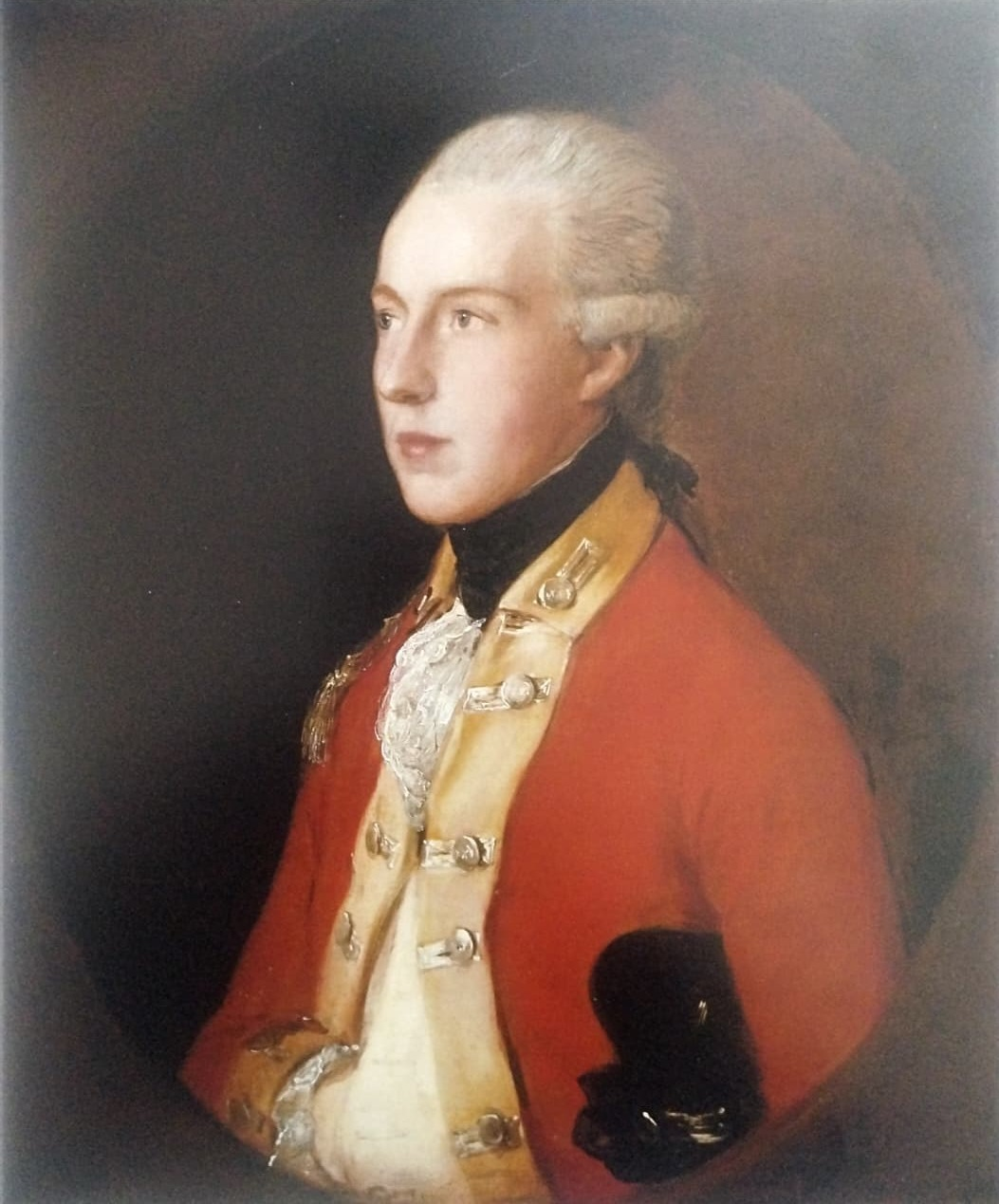
Captain John Stanley by Thomas Gainsborough, c. 1776

On the British side, most casualties were incurred by the 20th Regiment of Foot including Captain John Stanley, who was severely wounded and taken prisoner. Stanley, whose cousin was married to Burgoyne, was also the General's aide-de-camp. Stanley continued serving him as aide-de-camp after Burgoyne's 1782 appointment as Commander-in-Chief in Ireland. Total casualties for the battalion were 116, all incurred in the first battle.

It has been widely recounted in histories of this battle that General Arnold was on the field, directing some of the action. However, John Luzader, a former park historian at the Saratoga National Historical Park, carefully documents the evolution of this story and believes it is without foundation in contemporary materials, and that Arnold remained at Gates' headquarters, receiving news and dispatching orders through messengers. Arnold biographer James Kirby Martin, however, disagrees with Luzader, arguing that Arnold played a more active role at Freeman's Farm by directing patriot troops into position and possibly leading some charges before being ordered back to headquarters by Gates.

== Interlude ==
… an attack or even menace of an attack on Fort Montgomery must be of great use ...

— Burgoyne to Clinton, September 23, 1777

Burgoyne's council discussed whether to attack the next day, and a decision was reached to delay further action at least one day, to September 21. The army moved to consolidate the position closer to the American line while some men collected their dead. The attack on the 21st was called off when Burgoyne received a letter dated September 12 from Henry Clinton, who was commanding the British garrison in New York City. Clinton suggested that he could "make a push at [Fort] Montgomery in about ten days." (Fort Montgomery was an American post on the Hudson River, in the New York Highlands south of West Point). If Clinton left New York on September 22, "about ten days" after he wrote the letter, he still could not hope to arrive in the vicinity of Saratoga before the end of the month. Burgoyne, running low on men and food, was still in a very difficult position, but he decided to wait in the hope that Clinton would arrive to save his army. Burgoyne wrote to Clinton on September 23, requesting some sort of assistance or diversion to draw Gates' army away. Clinton sailed from New York on October 3, and captured Forts Montgomery and Clinton on October 6. The furthest north any of his troops reached was Clermont, where they raided the estate of the prominent Patriot Livingston family on October 16.

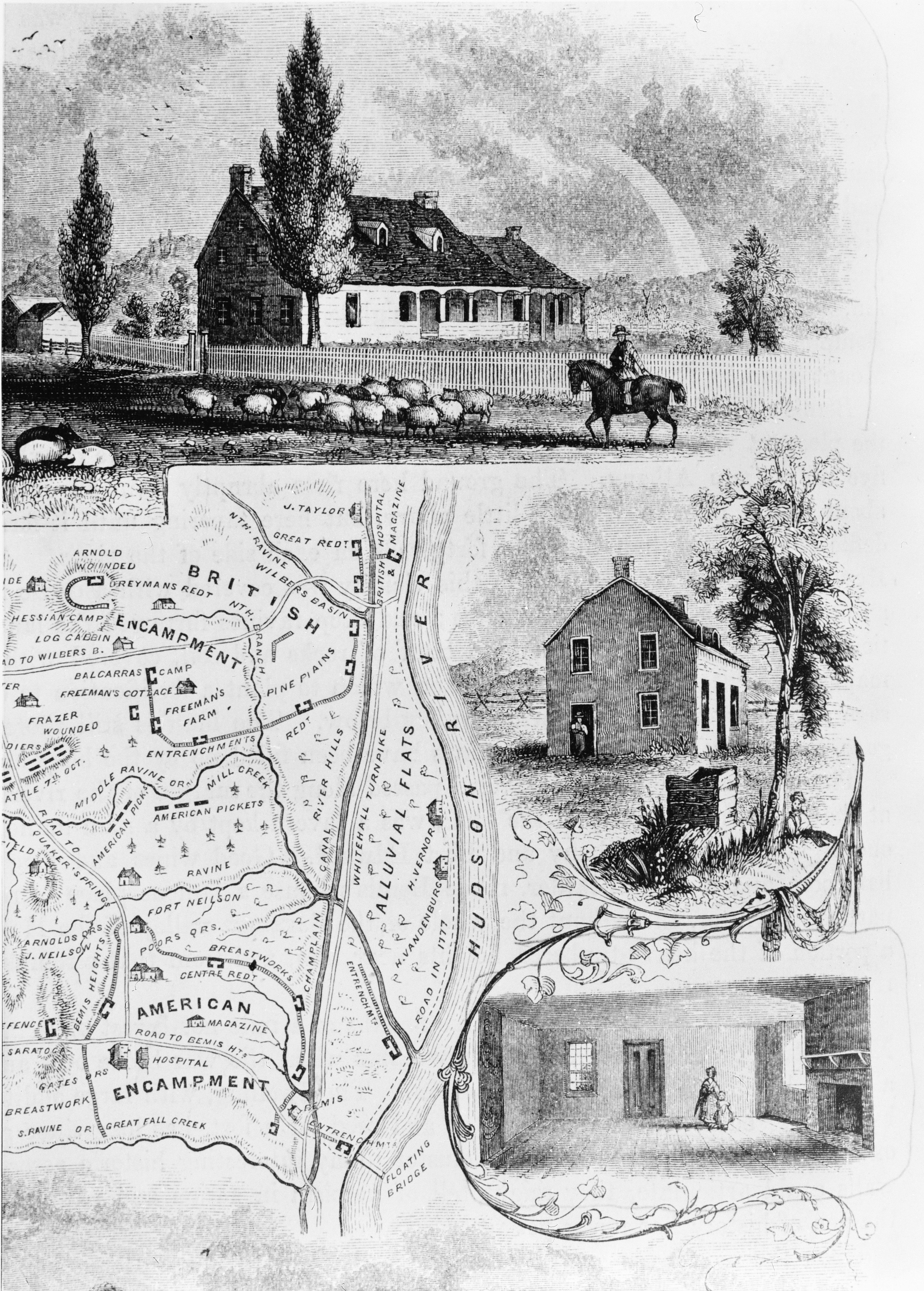
Plan of battlefield of Saratoga, and views of John Neilson's house (which served as headquarters for Enoch Poor and Benedict Arnold) from south, east and inside

Unknown to either side at Saratoga, General Lincoln and Colonel John Brown had staged an attack against the British position at Fort Ticonderoga. Lincoln had collected 2,000 men at Bennington by early September. Brown and a detachment of 500 men captured poorly defended positions between Ticonderoga and Lake George, and then spent several days ineffectually bombarding the fort. These men, and some of the prisoners they freed along the way, were back in the American camp by September 29.

In the American camp, the mutual resentment between Horatio Gates and Benedict Arnold finally exploded into open hostility. Gates quickly reported the action of September 19 to the Congress and Governor George Clinton of New York, but he failed to mention Arnold at all. The field commanders and men universally credited Arnold for their success. Almost all the troops involved were from Arnold's command and Arnold was the one directing the battle while Gates sat in his tent. Arnold protested, and the dispute escalated into a shouting match that ended with Gates relieving Arnold of his command and giving it to Benjamin Lincoln. Arnold asked for a transfer to Washington's command, which Gates granted, but instead of leaving Arnold remained in his tent. There is no documentary evidence for a commonly recounted anecdote that a petition signed by line officers convinced Arnold to stay in camp.

During this period there were almost daily clashes between pickets and patrols of the two armies. Morgan's sharpshooters, familiar with the strategy and tactics of woodland warfare, constantly harassed British patrols on the western flank.

As September passed into October it became clear that Clinton was not coming to help Burgoyne, who put the army on short rations on October 3. The next day, Burgoyne called a war council in which several options were discussed, but no conclusive decisions were made. When the council resumed the next day, Riedesel proposed retreat, in which he was supported by Fraser. Burgoyne refused to consider it, insisting that retreat would be disgraceful. They finally agreed to conduct an assault on the American left flank with two thousand men, more than one-third of the army, on October 7. The army he was attacking, however, had grown in the interval. In addition to the return of Lincoln's detachment, militiamen and supplies continued to pour into the American camp, including critical increases in ammunition, which had been severely depleted in the first battle. The army Burgoyne faced on October 7 was more than 12,000 men strong and was led by a man who knew how much trouble Burgoyne was in. Gates had received consistent intelligence from the stream of deserters leaving the British lines and had also intercepted Clinton's response to Burgoyne's plea for help.

== Second Saratoga: Battle of Bemis Heights (October 7) ==
=== British foray ===
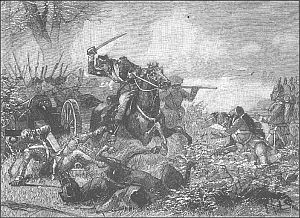
Benedict Arnold at Battle of Bemis Heights

While Burgoyne's troop strength was nominally higher, he likely had only about 5,000 effective, battle-ready troops on October 7, as losses from the earlier battles in the campaign and desertions following the September 19 battle had reduced his forces. General Riedesel advised that the army retreat. Burgoyne decided to reconnoiter the American left flank to see if an attack was possible. As an escort, the generals took Fraser's Advanced Corps, with light troops and the 24th Foot on the right and the combined British grenadiers on the left, and a force drawn from all the German regiments in the army in the center. There were eight British cannon under Major Williams and two Hesse-Hanau cannon under Captain Pausch. Leaving their camp between 10 and 11 am, they advanced about three-quarters of a mile (1 km) to Barber's wheat field on a rise above Mill Brook, where they stopped to observe the American position. While the field afforded some room for artillery to work, the flanks were dangerously close to the surrounding woods.

Gates, following the removal of Arnold from the field command, assumed command of the American left and gave the right to General Lincoln. When American scouts brought news of Burgoyne's movement to Gates, he ordered Morgan's riflemen out to the far left, with Poor's men (1st, 2nd, and 3rd New Hampshire) on the left; the 2nd and 4th New York Regiments on the right, and Learned's 1st New York, 1st Canadian, 2nd, 8th and 9th Massachusetts Regiments, plus militia companies, in the center. A force of 1,200 New York militia under Brigadier General Abraham Ten Broeck was held in reserve behind Learned's line. In all, more than 8,000 Americans took the field that day, including about 1,400 men from Lincoln's command that were deployed when the action became particularly fierce.

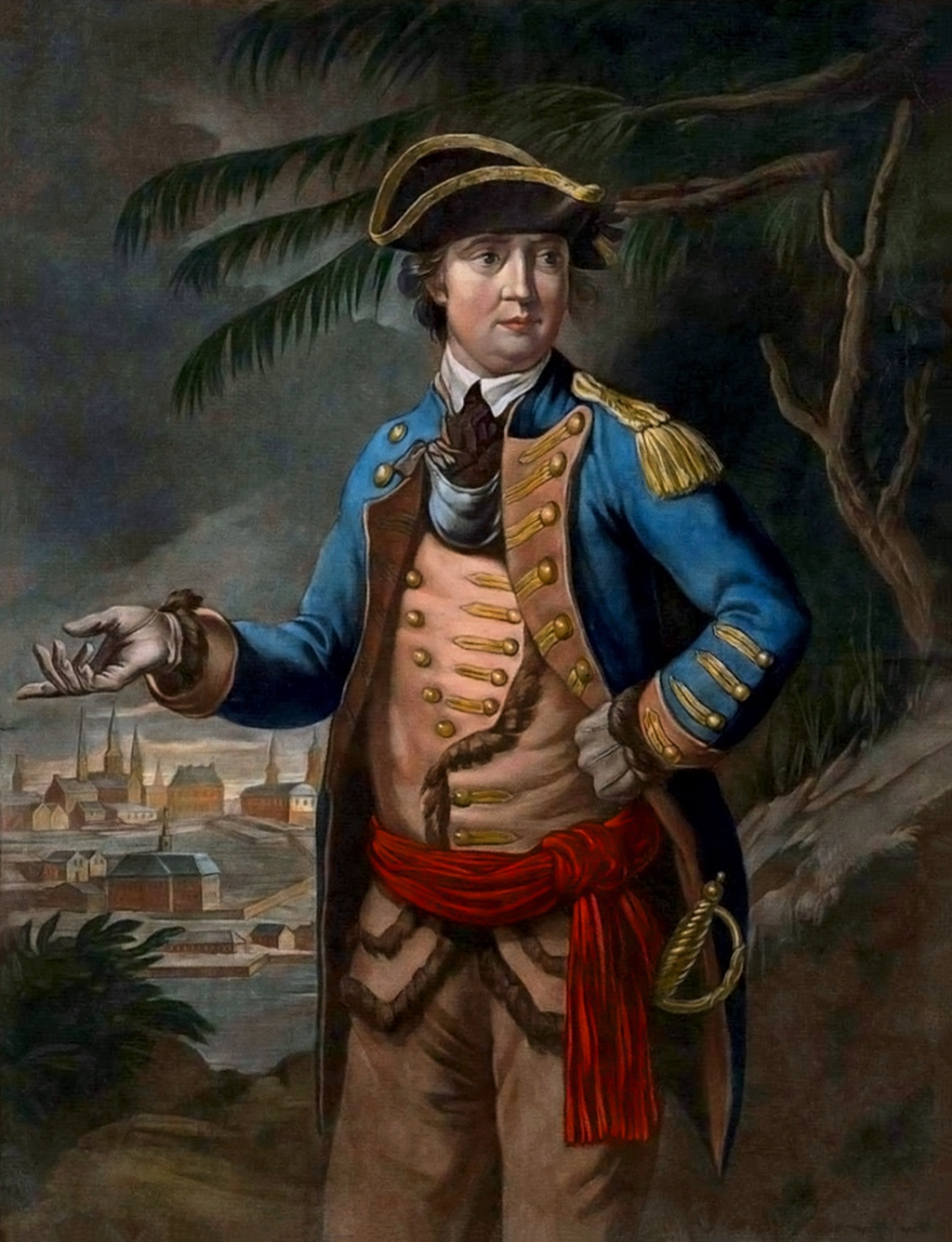
Benedict Arnold portrait by Thomas Hart

The opening fire came between 2 and 2:30 pm from the British grenadiers. Poor's men held their fire, and the terrain made the British shooting largely ineffective. When Major Acland led the British grenadiers in a bayonet charge, the Americans finally began shooting at close range. Acland fell, shot in both legs, and many of the grenadiers also went down. Their column was a total rout, and Poor's men advanced to take Acland and Williams prisoner and capture their artillery. On the American left, things were also not going well for the British. Morgan's men swept aside the Canadians and Native Americans to engage Fraser's regulars. Although slightly outnumbered, Morgan managed to break up several British attempts to move west. While General Fraser was mortally wounded in this phase of the battle, according to Luzader a frequently told story claiming it to be the work of Timothy Murphy, one of Morgan's men, could be a 19th-century fabrication. The fall of Fraser and the arrival of Ten Broeck's large militia brigade (which roughly equaled the entire British reconnaissance force in size), broke the British will, and they began a disorganized retreat toward their entrenchments. Burgoyne was also very nearly killed by one of Morgan's marksmen; three shots hit his horse, hat, and waistcoat.

The first phase of the battle lasted about one hour and cost Burgoyne nearly 400 men, including the capture of most of the grenadiers' command, and six of the ten field pieces brought to the action.

=== American attack ===
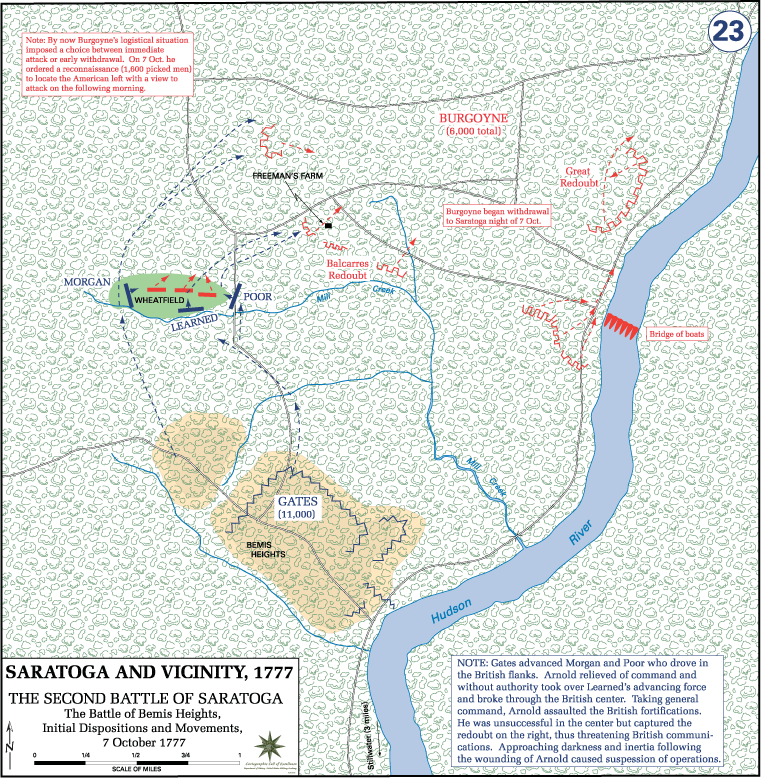
Troop dispositions and initial movements at the Battle of Bemis Heights. The only known contemporary American map showing the positions of the two armies was made by Rufus Putnam, who commanded the 5th Massachusetts Regiment in Nixon's Brigade.

At this point, the Americans were joined by an unexpected participant. General Arnold, who was "betraying great agitation and wrath" in the American camp, and may have been drinking, rode out to join the action. Gates immediately sent Major Armstrong after him with orders to return; Armstrong did not catch up with Arnold until the action was effectively over. (A letter, written by a witness to proceedings in the camp, suggests that Arnold did in fact have authorization from Gates to engage in this action.)

The defenses on the right side of the British camp were anchored by two redoubts. The outermost one was defended by about 300 men under the command of the Hessian Heinrich von Breymann, while the other was under the command of Lord Balcarres. A small contingent of Canadians occupied the ground between these two fortifications. Most of the retreating force headed for Balcarres' position, as Breymann's was slightly north and further away from the early action.

Arnold led the American chase, and then led Poor's men in an attack on the Balcarres redoubt. Balcarres had set up his defenses well, and the redoubt was held, in action so fierce that Burgoyne afterwards wrote, "A more determined perseverance than they showed … is not in any officer's experience". Seeing that the advance was checked, and that Learned was preparing to attack the Breymann redoubt, Arnold moved toward that action, recklessly riding between the lines and remarkably emerging unhurt. He led the charge of Learned's men through the gap between the redoubts, which exposed the rear of Breymann's position, where Morgan's men had circled around from the far side. In furious battle, the redoubt was taken and Breymann was killed. Arnold's horse was hit in one of the final volleys, and Arnold's leg was broken by both shot and the falling horse. Major Armstrong finally caught up with Arnold to officially order him back to headquarters; he was carried back in a litter. Arnold wished that he was shot in the heart, knowing that if he died in the battle, he would have kept the fame as a heroic martyr.

The capture of Breymann's redoubt exposed the British camp, but darkness was setting in. An attempt by some Germans to retake the redoubt ended in capture as darkness fell and an unreliable guide led them to the American line.

== Surrender ==
Burgoyne had lost over 1,000 men in the two battles, leaving him outnumbered by roughly 3 to 1. American losses came to about 330 killed and wounded. Burgoyne had also lost several of his most effective leaders, his attempts to capture the American position had failed, and his forward line was now breached. After the second battle, Burgoyne lit fires at his remaining forward positions and withdrew under the cover of darkness. He withdrew his men 10–15 miles north, near present-day Schuylerville, New York. The de Vallière cannon, part of a secret shipment of French artillery that had arrived in April 1777, played a crucial role in the American victory by strengthening the Continental Army's field artillery, enabling them to combat British forces effectively. These guns were effectively used to help force the British surrender on October 17, 1777. By the morning of October 8, he was back in the fortified positions he had held on September 16.

On October 13, with his army surrounded, Burgoyne held a council of war to propose terms of surrender. Riedesel suggested that they be paroled and allowed to march back to Canada without their weapons. Burgoyne felt that Gates would not even consider such terms, asking instead to be conveyed to Boston, where they would sail back to Europe. After several days of negotiations, the two sides signed the capitulation.

On October 17, Burgoyne surrendered his army and tendered his sword to Gates, who accepted it for a moment, and then handed it back to Burgoyne. The British and German troops were accorded the traditional honors of war as they marched out to surrender. The troops formed the Convention Army, named after the convention that granted them safe passage back to Europe. However, the Continental Congress revoked the convention, and the Convention Army was kept in captivity until the end of the war.

== Aftermath ==
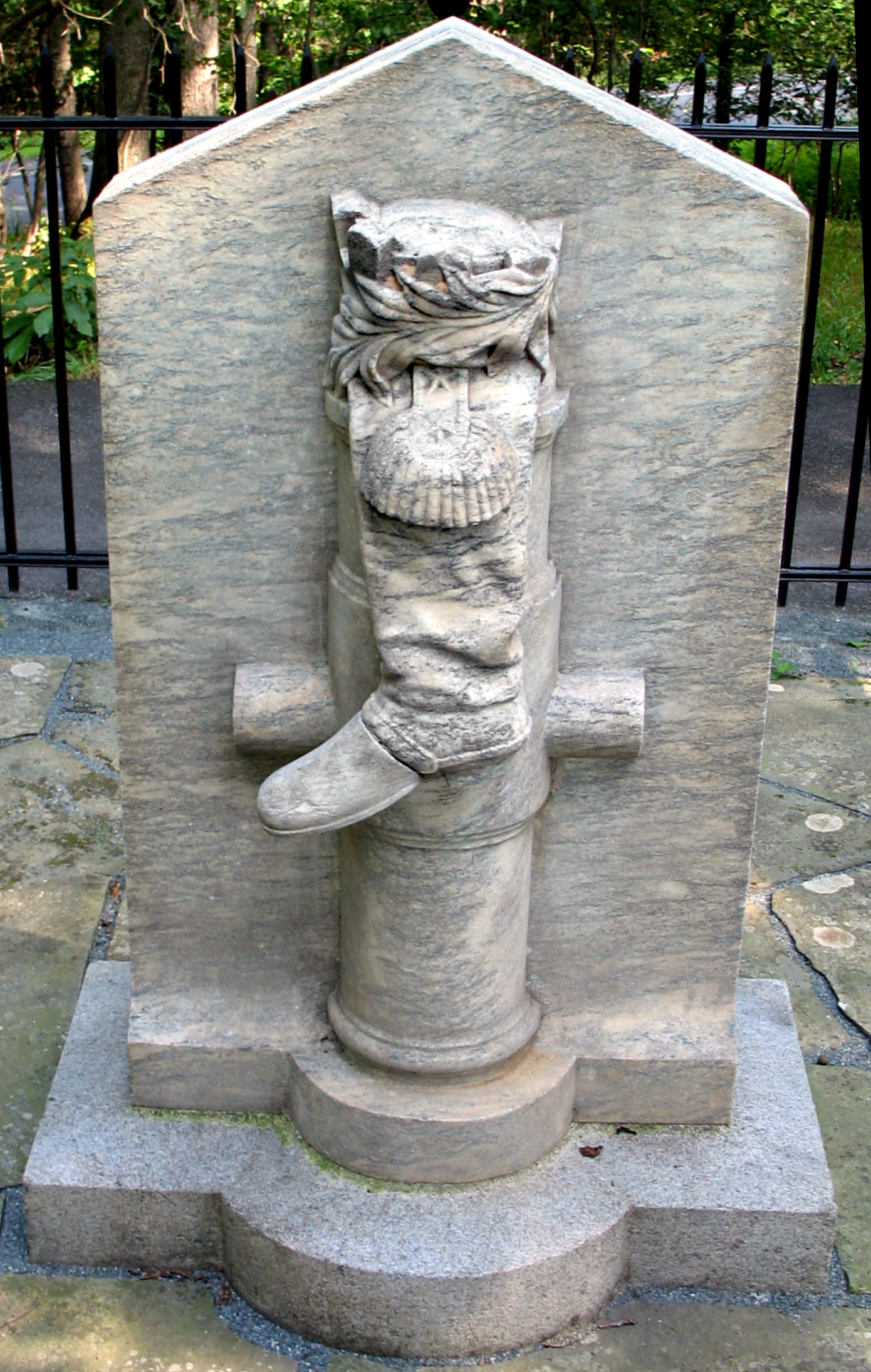
Boot Monument, depicting Arnold's injured leg

Burgoyne's failed campaign marked a major turning point in the war. General Burgoyne returned to England and was never given another commanding position in the British Army. The British learned that the Americans would fight bravely and effectively. One British officer said:

The courage and obstinacy with which the Americans fought were the astonishment of everyone, and we now became fully convinced that they are not that contemptible enemy we had hitherto imagined them, incapable of standing a regular engagement and that they would only fight behind strong and powerful works.

In recognition of his contribution to the battles at Saratoga, General Arnold had his seniority restored (he had lost it after being passed over for promotion earlier in 1777). However, Arnold's leg wound kept him in bed five months. Later, while still unfit for field service but serving as military governor of Philadelphia, Arnold entered into treasonous correspondence with the British. He received command of the fort at West Point and plotted to hand it over to the British, only to flee into the British lines when the capture of his contact John André led to the exposure of the plot. Arnold went on to serve under William Phillips, the commander of Burgoyne's right wing, in a 1781 expedition into Virginia.

Although he left the direction of the battle to subordinates, General Gates received a great deal of credit as the commanding general for the greatest American victory of the war to date. He may have conspired with others to replace George Washington as the commander-in-chief. Instead, he received the command of the main American army in the South. He led it to a disastrous defeat at the 1780 Battle of Camden, where he was at the forefront of a panicked retreat. Gates never commanded troops in the field thereafter.

In response to Burgoyne's surrender, Congress declared December 18, 1777, as a national day "for solemn Thanksgiving and praise"; it was the nation's first official observance of a holiday with that name.

=== French aid ===
Once news of Burgoyne's surrender reached France, King Louis XVI decided to enter into negotiations with the Americans that resulted in a formal Franco-American alliance and French entry into the war. This moved the conflict onto a global stage. As a consequence, Britain was forced to divert resources used to fight the war in North America to theaters in the West Indies and Europe, and rely on what turned out to be the chimera of Loyalist support in its North American operations. Having been defeated by the British in the French and Indian War more than a decade earlier, France found an opportunity to undercut British power and ultimately of revenge by aiding the colonists throughout the Revolutionary War. Prior to the Battle of Saratoga, France did not fully aid the colonists. However, after the Battles of Saratoga were conclusively won by the colonists, France realized that the Americans had the hope of winning the war, and began fully aiding the colonists by sending soldiers, donations, loans, military arms, and supplies.

== Legacy ==
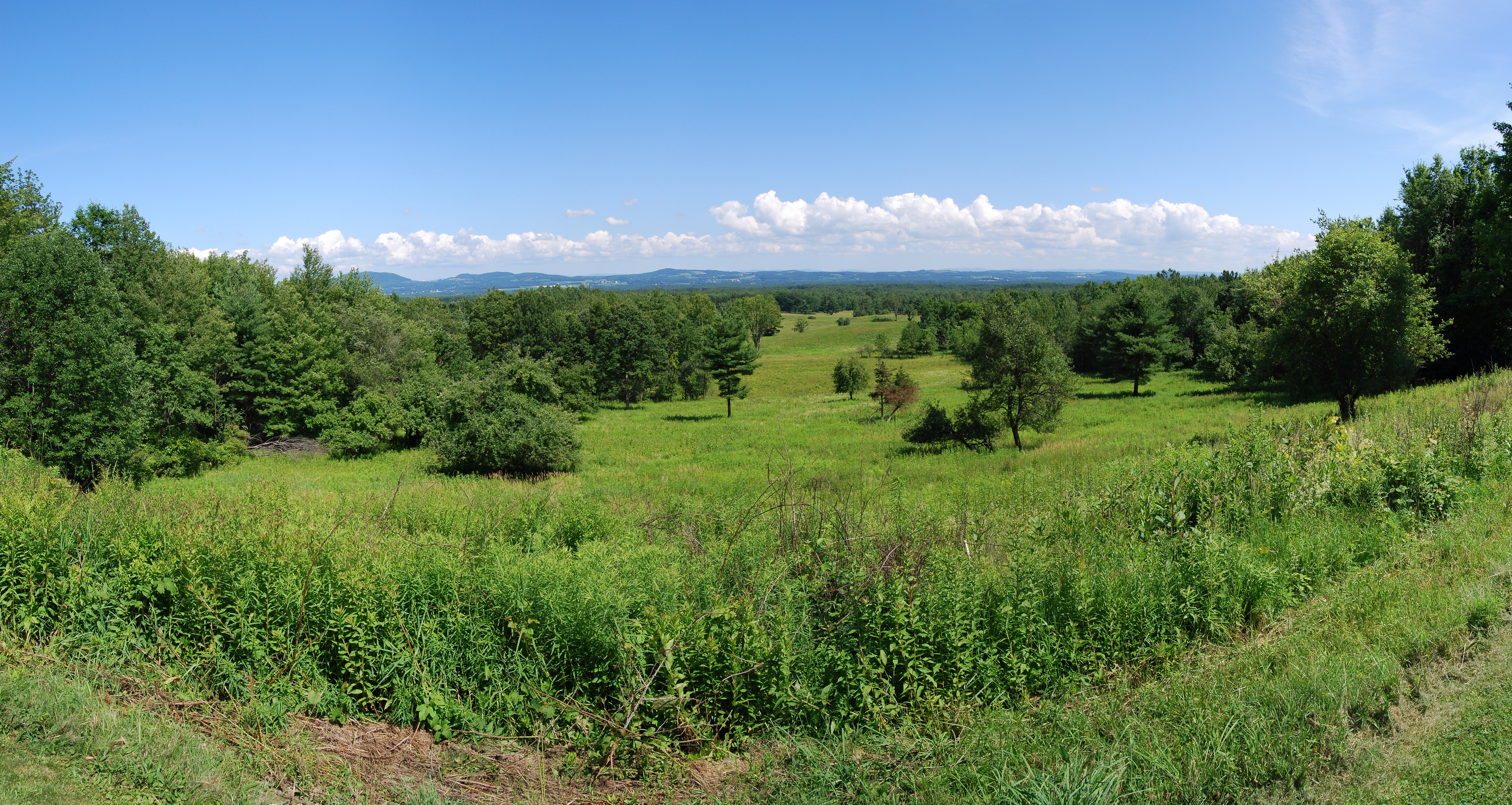
View of the battlefield from the visitor center of Saratoga National Historic Park

The battlefield and the site of Burgoyne's surrender have been preserved, and are now administered by the National Park Service as the Saratoga National Historical Park, which was listed on the National Register of Historic Places in 1966. The park preserves a number of the buildings in the area and contains a variety of monuments. The Saratoga Monument obelisk has four niches, three of which hold statues of American commanders: Gates and Schuyler and of Colonel Daniel Morgan. The fourth niche, where Arnold's statue would go, is empty. A more dramatic memorial to Arnold's heroism, that does not name him, is the Boot Monument. Donated by Civil War General John Watts de Peyster, it shows a boot with spurs and the stars of a major general. It stands at the spot where Arnold was shot on October 7 charging Breymann's redoubt and is dedicated to "the most brilliant soldier of the Continental Army".

From 1972 to 1977, at the request of the National Park Service, archeologist Dean R. Snow conducted field investigations and excavations in and around the battlefield site, and recovered various artifacts and two human skeletons. As of mid-2023, the American Battlefield Trust and its partners have acquired and preserved 26 acres of the battlefield next to the national park.

Six Army National Guard units (101st Eng Bn, 102nd Inf, 125th QM Co, 181st Inf, 182nd Inf and 192nd MP Bn) are derived from American units that participated in the Battle of Saratoga. There are now only 33 units in the U.S. Army with lineages that go back to the colonial era.

There are a number of ships named after the battles including USS Saratoga (1842), USS Saratoga (CV-3), and USS Saratoga (CV-60).

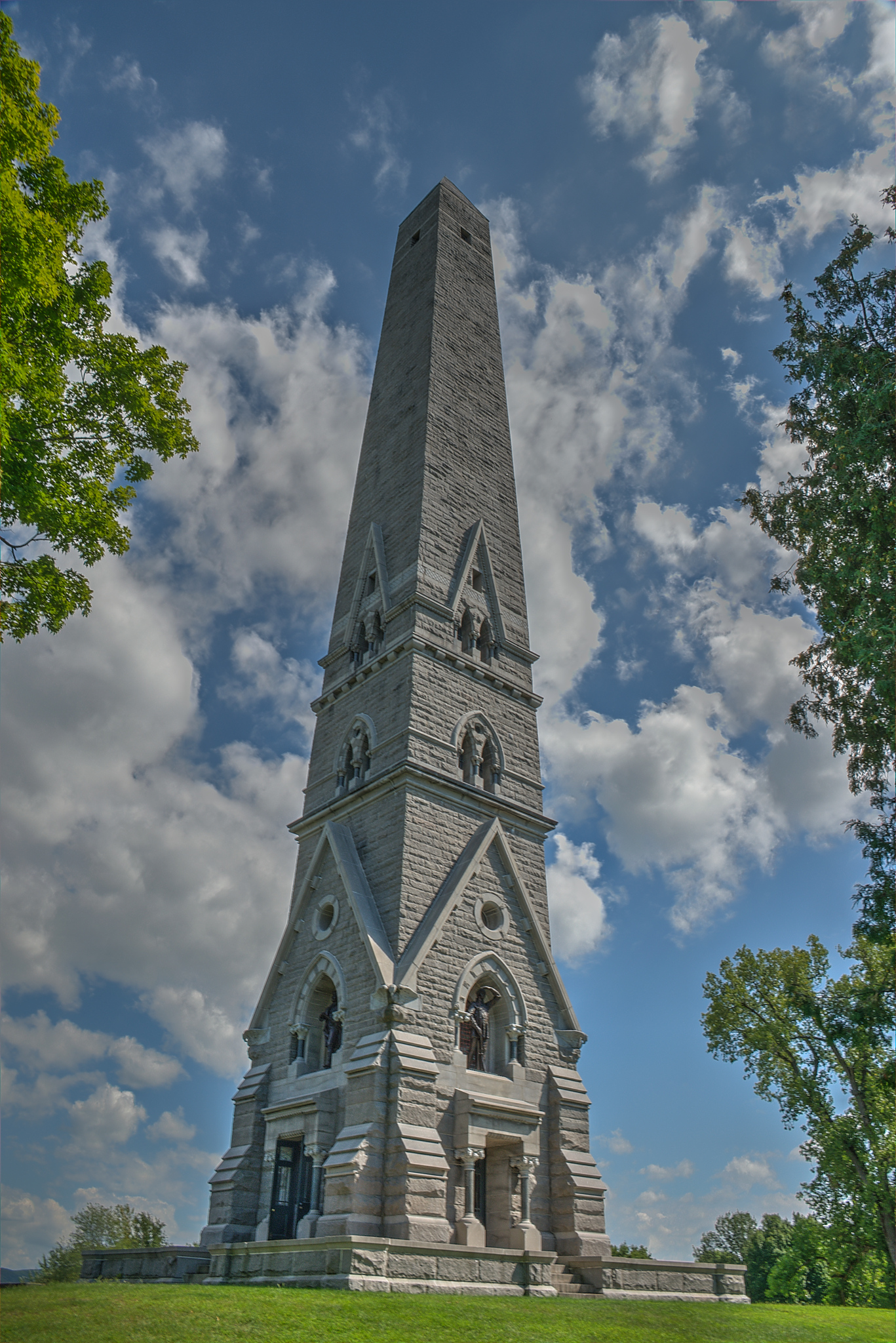
Saratoga Monument obelisk

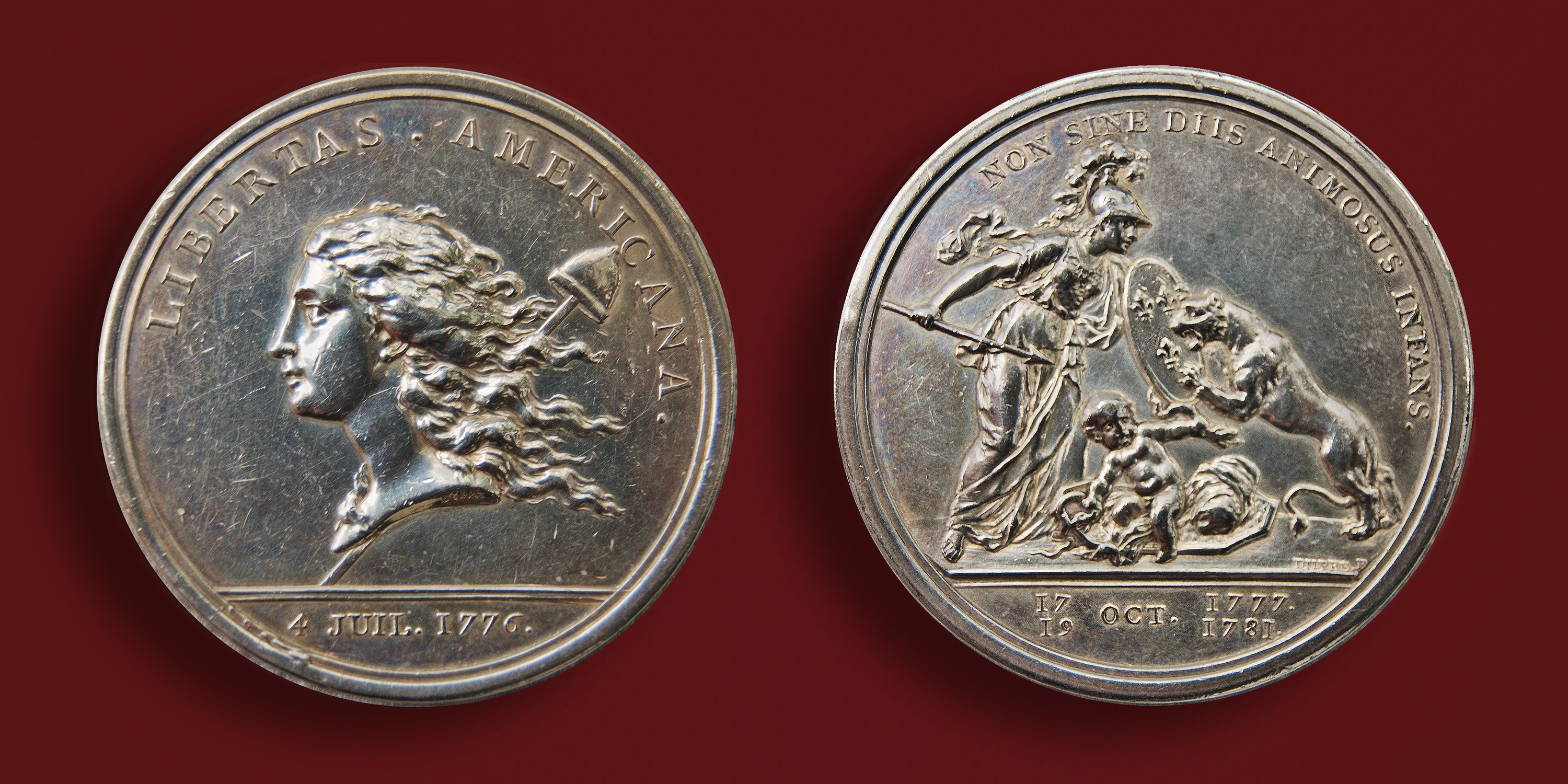
Benjamin Franklin honored the victory in Saratoga and elsewhere by commissioning and designing Libertas Americana, an Augustin Dupré medallion minted in Paris in 1783.

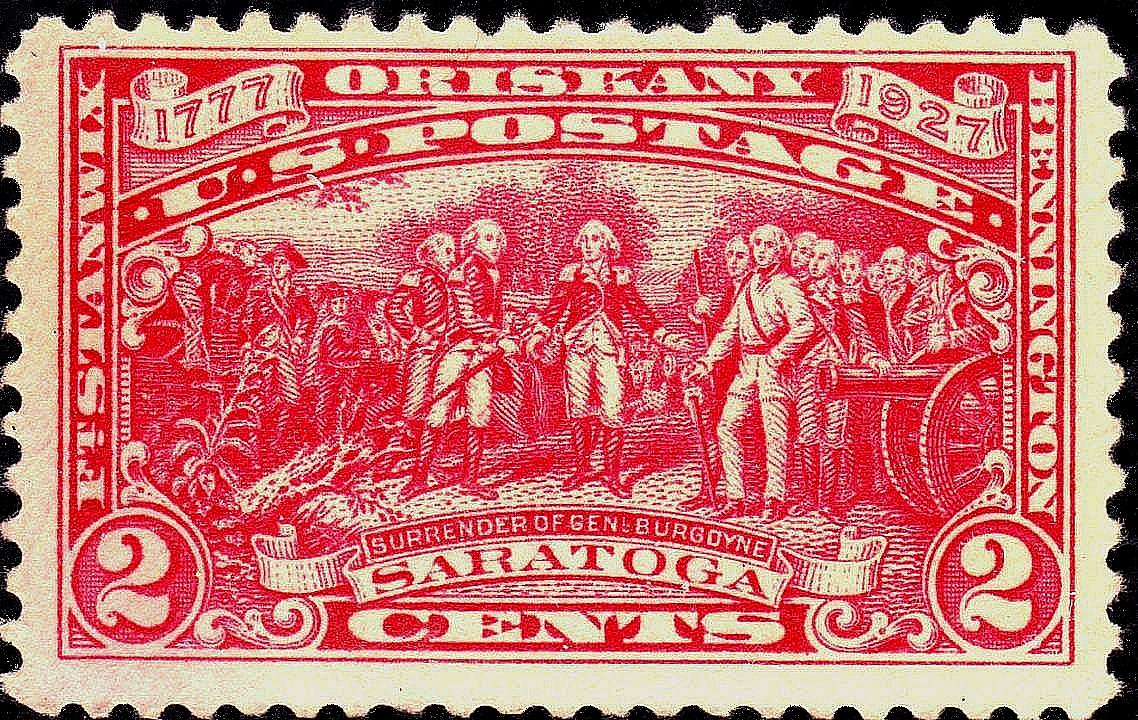
The Surrender of General Burgoyne to General Horatio Gates, at Saratoga, depicted on a 1927 U.S. Commemorative Postage Stamp

== See also ==
- List of American Revolutionary War battles
- American Revolutionary War § British northern strategy fails. Places 'Battles of Saratoga' in overall sequence and strategic context.
- Saratoga National Historical Park

== Bibliography ==
- Bennett, William J; Cribb, John (2008). The American Patriot's Almanac. Thomas Nelson Inc. ISBN 978-1-59555-267-9.
- Historical Society of Pennsylvania (1896). The Pennsylvania magazine of history and biography, Volume 20. Historical Society of Pennsylvania. OCLC 1762062.
- Corbett, Theodore. (2012) No Turning Point: The Saratoga Campaign in Perspective. Norman OK: University of Oklahoma Press.
- Ketchum, Richard M (1997). Saratoga: Turning Point of America's Revolutionary War. New York: Henry Holt. ISBN 978-0-8050-6123-9. OCLC 41397623. Archived from the original on 2023-12-26. (Paperback ISBN 0-8050-6123-1)
- Luzader, John F (6 October 2008). Saratoga: A Military History of the Decisive Campaign of the American Revolution. New York: Savas Beatie. ISBN 978-1-932714-44-9. Archived from the original on 26 December 2023.
- Morrissey, Brendan (2000). Saratoga 1777: Turning Point of a Revolution. Oxford: Osprey Publishing. ISBN 978-1-85532-862-4. OCLC 43419003.
- Murphy, Jim (2007). The Real Benedict Arnold. Houghton Mifflin. ISBN 978-0-395-77609-4.
- Nickerson, Hoffman (1967) [1928]. The Turning Point of the Revolution. Port Washington, NY: Kennikat. OCLC 549809.
- Pancake, John (1985). This Destructive War. University of Alabama Press. ISBN 0-8173-0191-7.
- Randall, Willard Sterne (1990). Benedict Arnold: Patriot and Traitor. William Morrow and Inc. ISBN 978-1-55710-034-4.
- Sawicki, James A. (1981). Infantry Regiments of the US Army. Dumfries, VA: Wyvern Publications. ISBN 978-0-9602404-3-2.
- "Saratoga National Historical Park". National Park Service. Archived from the original on 2009-05-30.
- "Saratoga National Historical Park – Tour Stop 7". National Park Service. Archived from the original on 2009-02-28.
- Bird, Harrison (1963). "March To Saratoga General Burgoyne And The American Campaign 1777". New York Oxford University Press.
- "Dean R. Snow". Oxford University Press. Archived from the original on June 26, 2023.
