= New York Line =

Military formation in the Continental Army

New York Line soldiers in 1775

The New York Line was a formation within the Continental Army. The term "New York Line" referred to the quota of numbered infantry regiments assigned to New York at various times by the Continental Congress. These, together with similar contingents from the other twelve states, formed the Continental Line. The concept was particularly important in relation to the promotion of commissioned officers. Officers of the Continental Army below the rank of brigadier general were ordinarily ineligible for promotion except in the line of their own state.

Not all Continental infantry regiments raised in a state were part of a state quota, however. On December 27, 1776, the Continental Congress gave Washington temporary control over certain military decisions that the Congress ordinarily regarded as its own prerogative. These "dictatorial powers" included the authority to raise sixteen additional Continental infantry regiments at large.

Early in 1777, Washington offered command of one of these additional regiments to William Malcolm of New York, who accepted. Malcolm had formerly commanded a New York militia unit. Half of Malcolm's Regiment was drawn from New York and half from Pennsylvania.

Still other Continental infantry regiments and smaller units, also unrelated to a state quota, were raised as needed for special or temporary service. Nicholson's Regiment, raised in 1776 for the defense of Canada, was an example of such an "extra" regiment.

== New York Line, 1775 ==
The New York Line was created in consequence of the capture of Fort Ticonderoga by Ethan Allen on May 10, 1775. The Second Continental Congress resolved on May 25, 1775, to permit the Province of New York to maintain as many as 3,000 troops at Continental expense. Under this authority, New York raised four regiments, each of some 750 men, which were designated the 1st, 2d, 3d, and 4th New York Regiments. The enlistments in this first establishment ended on December 31, 1775.

After the first enlistments of the four regiments ended, the remaining men were to be formed into two regiments, but Colonel Ritzema informed the New York Provincial Congress that the remaining men could not be usefully formed into even one regiment.

== New York Line, 1776 ==
The Continental Congress authorized the second establishment of the four regiments on January 19, 1776.

== New York Line, 1777 ==
The Continental Congress authorized the third establishment of the Continental Army on September 16, 1776. The troops raised under this Congressional resolution were to serve for the duration of the war.

The number of regiments was reduced from five to two on January 1, 1781.

== New York Brigade ==
The New York Brigade was first established from the New York regiments on July 22, 1778 to defend the New York frontier.

== Footnotes ==
=== Sources ===
- Fernow, Berthold, New York in the Revolution, 1887.
- Wright, Robert K. The Continental Army. Washington, D.C.: United States Army Center of Military History, 1983. Available online.
