= Frederick, Baron de Weissenfels =

American soldier

- Born: Elbing, Samland, Kingdom of Prussia
- Died: May 14, 1806 (aged 97–98); New Orleans, Louisiana Territory, U.S.
- Military career
- Allegiance: Kingdom of Prussia United Kingdom United States of America
- Branch: Prussian Army; British Army; United States Army
- Conflicts: War of the Austrian Succession; French and Indian Wars; Battle of Ticonderoga; Battle of the Plains of Abraham; Battle of Havana; American Revolutionary War; Battle of Quebec; Battle of White Plains; Battle of Trenton; Battle of Saratoga; Battle of Monmouth

Frederick, von Weissenfels [also Friedrich Heinrich Freiherr von Weissenfels] [also Frederick, Baron de Weissenfels] (1738 – 14 May 1806) was a leading soldier in the service of the Continental Army and the State of New York during the American Revolutionary War.

== Biography ==
He was born in about 1728 in the Kingdom of Prussia near the town of Elbing in Samland. Frederick received his military training under Frederick II of Prussia at the Military Academy at Königsberg. He served in a Regiment of Dragoons in the Prussian Army during the War of the Austrian Succession (1740–1748). He served six years in a cavalry unit in the army of the United Provinces of the Netherland garrisoned at Zutphen.

He was commissioned a lieutenant in the Royal American Regiment of Foot also known as the 62nd (Royal American) Regiment and the Kings Royal Rifle Corps, on Feb. 23, 1756. The creation of the regiment by Parliament was unique in that it allowed for "a certain number of foreign Protestants, who have served abroad as officers or engineers, to act and rank as officers or engineers in America only..." About fifty officers' commissions were given to Germans and Swiss. Weissenfels was one of these. In 1757, the unit was renumbered as the 60th (Royal American) Foot. Weissenfels served in this regiment for four years. He fought in the French and Indian War during the battles of the Plains of Abraham, Ticonderoga and Havana.

His first marriage, on December 16, 1756, was to Mary Shurmur, born about 1735 in New York, the daughter of Samuel Shurmur, a New York City merchant, and Catherine Cazalet, the daughter of French Huguenot refugees, in the Dutch Reform Church of New York City. She died in about 1775 in New York City. The marriage produced eight children: Ann (1757–1847), Charles Frederick (1760–1795), Catherine Maria (1761–1830), George Peter (1764–1798), John Henry (1767–1787), William Henry (born 1770), Mary Charlotte (born 1772), and Elizabeth Anna (born 1775).

Weissenfels took an Oath of Allegiance to Great Britain on December 20, 1763. That same year, he settled in Dutchess County, New York with a British military pension of half pay.

His second marriage was to Elizabeth Williams on February 26, 1777. This marriage produced two children: Harriet (1779–1855) and Frederick (1780–1798).

According to a short biography produced by his daughter, Harriet Weissenfels Baker, in an attempt to obtain compensation for her father's monetary losses resulting from his service in the American Revolution she reported that, "Following his principles rather than the advice of friends, he early joined the side of the revolutionaries in the American Revolutionary War."

He was commissioned a captain in the First New York on June 28, 1775, commissioned lieutenant-colonel of the 3rd New York on March 8, 1776, became a lieutenant colonel of the 2nd New York on Nov. 21, 1776, and lieutenant colonel commandant of the 4th New York on January 13, 1779.

His first expedition was the 1775 Battle of Quebec. He fought at White Plains, Trenton, Saratoga and Monmouth. He accompanied Gen. John Sullivan's expedition against the Iroquois in 1779, and fought at Newtowne.

On January 1, 1781, Weissenfels was released from his service to the State of New York in a reduction in force. However, in April 1782, New York raised two regiments of Levies to defend the state's northern frontier (Mohawk Valley) from Canadian irregulars and their Native American allies. The American forces were under the overall command of Colonel Marius Willet, with whom Weissenfels had served earlier in the war.

In July 1781, Willet and Weissenfels led the militia in the Battle of Sharon Springs where they ambushed a force of Indians and Loyalists under the command of John Doxtader. In October, they led the militia against a mixed force under the command of Major John Ross at the Battle of Johnstown. Afterwards, the Americans marched to German Flatts as their scouts tracked the retreating force. A forced march through a heavy snowstorm brought the militia within two miles of the Loyalist camp by nightfall of October 29, but Willet decided against a night attack in the storm. Attacking the next morning, they found that the Loyalists had already broken camp, and they eventually escaped.

In late 1781, several companies of New Hampshire troops were added to Willet's command. In February, 1783, George Washington directed Willet to capture Fort Ontario, but the Americans gave up the attempt when the possibility of surprise was lost.

Washington visited the Mohawk valley in 1783 and he instructed Willett to improve the roads and waterway to Lake Oneida. In October, Willett's and Weissenfels' troops went home after being disbanded without ceremony. Weissenfels retired from service on Jan. 1, 1784.

From the end of his military service until the end of his life Weissenfels had financial difficulties. In 1784, Weissenfels petitioned the United States Congress for an appointment to a government office and to be treated and rewarded by Congress as "foreign officer," such as Frederick Von Steuben, had been rewarded for their service to the United States. Later that year, the Congress' Committee of the Week, recommended that "Congress confer upon him the first vacant office in their gift, which they may think him capable of filling." However, with regard to his second request they wrote, "With respect to his being put on a footing with foreign officers, who were in the service of the United States, the Committee are of the opinion it cannot be done consistently with the principles of general justice." His daughter, Harriet, and her children continued to seek compensation from Congress for 2,000 acres of land that the British Crown had promised to British Army officers at the conclusion of the French and Indian War, which Weissenfels forfeited when he joined the American cause. In 1859, after a thorough investigation, a bill to award the heirs the land was passed by the U.S. House of Representatives, but it died in the Senate. The commencement of the hostilities of the American Civil War in 1860 ended any hope of achieving the family's request. However, Weissenfels' grandchildren continued to press their claim with the last living grandchild, Lucy A. Baker, requesting Congressional action in 1877. Congress rejected her final plea on Jan. 21, 1877, 102 years after her grandfather had given up his British Army pension and any chance of obtaining the promised land to join the Revolution. She died Washington, D.C. in 1879.

By 1787, Weissenfels' financial difficulties were so severe that on February 23, 1787, the New York State Legislature passed a bond, "from Frederick Weissenfels to the people of the state, for such sum as shall be found due him, to be paid in such sums as shall be found due from him to them, to be paid in certificates issued by the treasurer, to discharge him from the suit against him by the people." This act of the New York Legislature may be an indication of the respect and regard which the people of New York State at that time had for Weissenfels' Revolutionary War service.

In June 1787, he wrote to George Washington requesting the general's assistance in obtaining a government appointment. In a letter from Washington to Weissenfels, dated January 10, 1788, the general declined.

The next month, on February 17, 1788, Weissenfels petitioned the New York City Common Council for a raise in his pay as captain of the city watch. Although his old friend, Marius Willet, was the sheriff of New York County during this time, the request was read and postponed.

On May 13, 1788, he again petitioned Congress to be treated as a foreign officer. He had apparently written again to Washington and this time the general had compiled and written a recommendation, but Congress again declined.

The next year, on April 7, 1789, Weissenfels was discharged as the captain of the city watch. He had been accused of sleeping on the job, but it may have been that he lost the job when Willet lost his position as sheriff. Weissenfels was a tired and pitiable 61-year-old, who was again poor and out of work.

On January 29, 1790, Weissenfels received a land bounty for 500 acres, but this did not seem to improve his financial situation. His son, George, was a "conveyancer," a sort of lawyer who dealt with land transfers, and the pair may have gotten caught up in the land speculation of the time.

He served as Inspector of Spiritous Liquors for the City of New York in 1791 and lived at Dry's Dock.

In 1796, Weissenfels was appointed Gauger of the customs in New York City. He apparently was given the job upon the death of his son, who had held that position until his death in 1795.

He remained a resident of New York City until 1805, the last time he is listed in the New York City Directory living at 3 Hudson.

Weissenfels was a member of the New York State Society of The Society of the Cincinnati. He was the first vice-president of the New York Deutsche Gesellschaft, of which Frederick von Steuben was for many years president.

At the time of his death on May 14, 1806, he filled a minor office in the police department in New Orleans. Louisiana. The position was likely obtained for him by Abraham Redwood Ellery, a wealthy New Orleans planter, lawyer, and the husband of his granddaughter, Sarah Charlotte Weissenfels.

Weissenfels' children also suffered after the war. His son and fellow Revolutionary soldier, Charles, who was the Collector of Customs in New York City in 1795, died that same year. Charles' wife, the former Rhoda Salter, ran a boarding house on Courtlandt Street until 1803. His son, Peter, the lawyer, who also served in the Revolution, first as a fifer and later as a Lieutenant, died in 1798. His wife, the former Maria Leaycraft, also ran a boarding house following her husband's death. She disappears from the New York City Directory between 1800 and 1805. Then, in 1806, she reappears following the exit of her father-in-law to New Orleans as a doctor living at 37 Murray St.
