= 2nd New York Regiment =

- New York Line troops in 1775
- Active: 25 May 1775–31 December 1775; 19 January 1776–15 November 1783
- Allegiance: United States
- Type: Infantry
- Part of: New York Line
- Engagements: American Revolutionary War: Invasion of Quebec; Battle of Valcour Island; Saratoga Campaign; Battle of Monmouth; Sullivan Expedition; Battle of Yorktown

Commanders
- Notable commanders: Goose Van Schaick; James Clinton; Philip Van Cortlandt; Frederick, Baron de Weissenfels

The 2nd New York Regiment was authorized on May 25, 1775, and formed at Albany from June 28 to August 4 for service with the Continental Army under the command of Colonel Goose Van Schaick. The enlistments of the first establishment ended on December 31, 1775.

The second establishment of the regiment was authorized on January 19, 1776.

The regiment saw action in the Invasion of Canada, Battle of Valcour Island, Battle of Saratoga, Battle of Monmouth, the Sullivan Expedition and the Battle of Yorktown. The regiment was furloughed, June 2, 1783, at Newburgh, New York and disbanded November 15, 1783.
