= 1st New York Regiment =

- New York Line troops in 1775
- Active: 1775–1783
- Allegiance: United Colonies; United States
- Branch: Continental Army
- Type: Line infantry
- Part of: New York Line
- Engagements: Invasion of Canada, Battle of Valcour Island, Battle of Saratoga, Battle of Monmouth, the Sullivan Expedition; Battle of Yorktown.

Commanders
- Notable commanders: Colonel Alexander McDougall; Colonel Rudolphus Ritzema; Colonel Goose Van Schaick

The 1st New York Regiment was authorized on 25 May 1775 and organized at New York City from 28 June to 4 August, for service with the Continental Army under the command of Colonel Alexander McDougall. The enlistments of the first establishment ended on 31 December 1775.

The second establishment of the regiment was authorized on 19 January 1776.

The regiment was involved in the Invasion of Canada, the Battle of Valcour Island, the Battle of Saratoga, the Battle of Monmouth, the Sullivan Expedition, and the Battle of Yorktown. The regiment was furloughed 2 June 1783 at Newburgh, New York and disbanded 15 November 1783.

== Notable members ==
- David Van Horne
