= Battle of Trenton order of battle =

List of military units at the Battle of Trenton

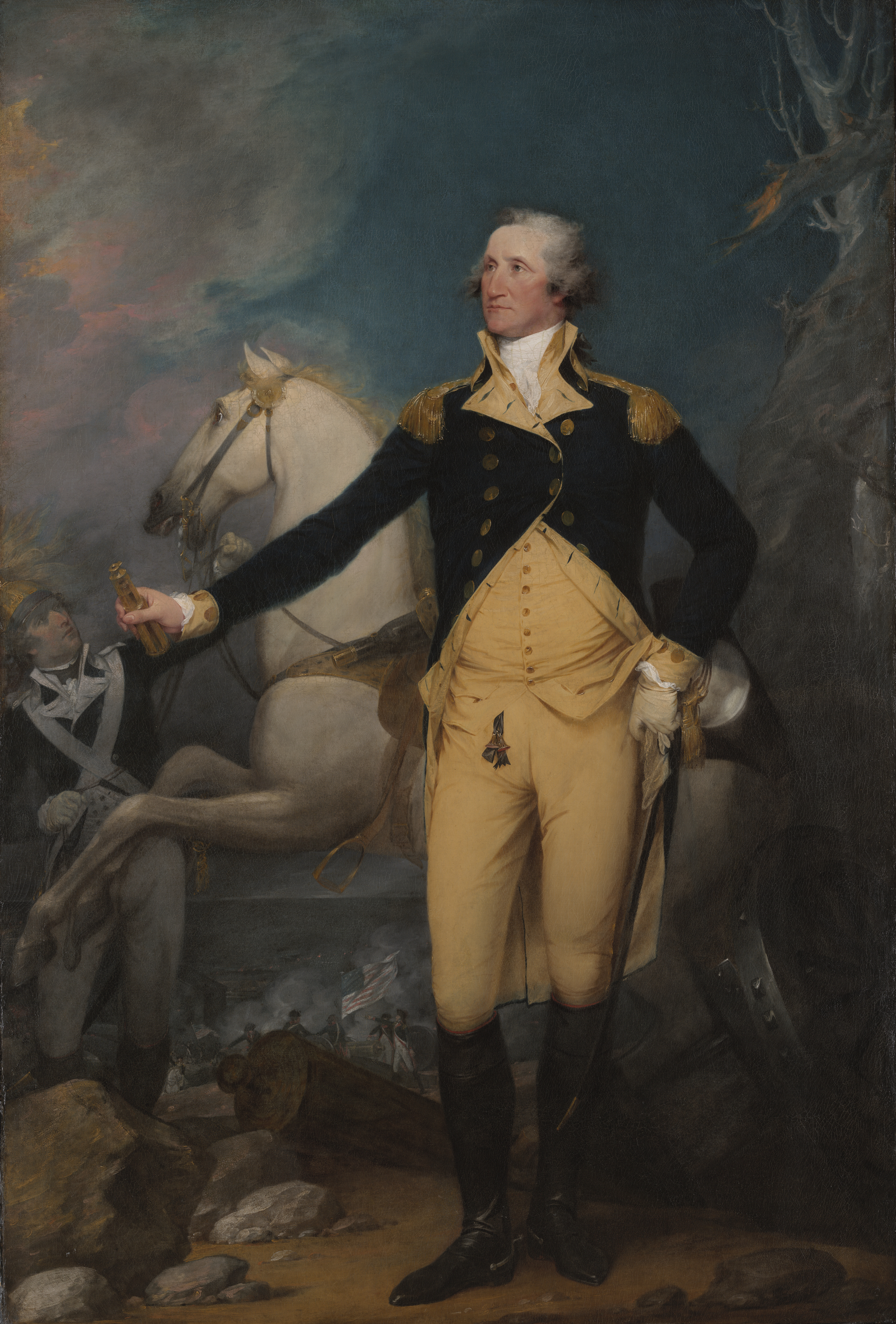
General George Washington at Trenton by John Trumbull, 1792

The Battle of Trenton was fought on December 26, 1776, during the American Revolutionary War campaign for New Jersey. In a surprise attack, the Continental Army led by George Washington attacked the winter quarters of a brigade composed primarily of German troops from Hesse-Kassel in Trenton, New Jersey. The Hessian brigade was under the command of Colonel Johann Rall; he died of wounds sustained in the battle, and about two thirds of his men were taken prisoner. It was the first major victory after a long string of defeats that had resulted in the loss of New York City, and was a significant boost to American morale. It was followed by two more American victories, first in a second battle at Trenton on January 2, 1777, and then on January 3 at Princeton.

Most of the German brigade comprised three Hessian regiments: those of Rall, von Lossberg, and von Knyphausen. The remainder of the brigade consisted of artillery corps attached to each regiment, a detachment of Jäger, and a small company of British dragoons. The attacking American army consisted of units from the Continental Army, including companies of its artillery, and a few companies of militia. Additional units were intended to also participate either in the attack, or in diversions to draw attention from the main thrust; these units failed to cross the icy Delaware River and did not participate in the action.

== Hesse-Kassel and British Army ==
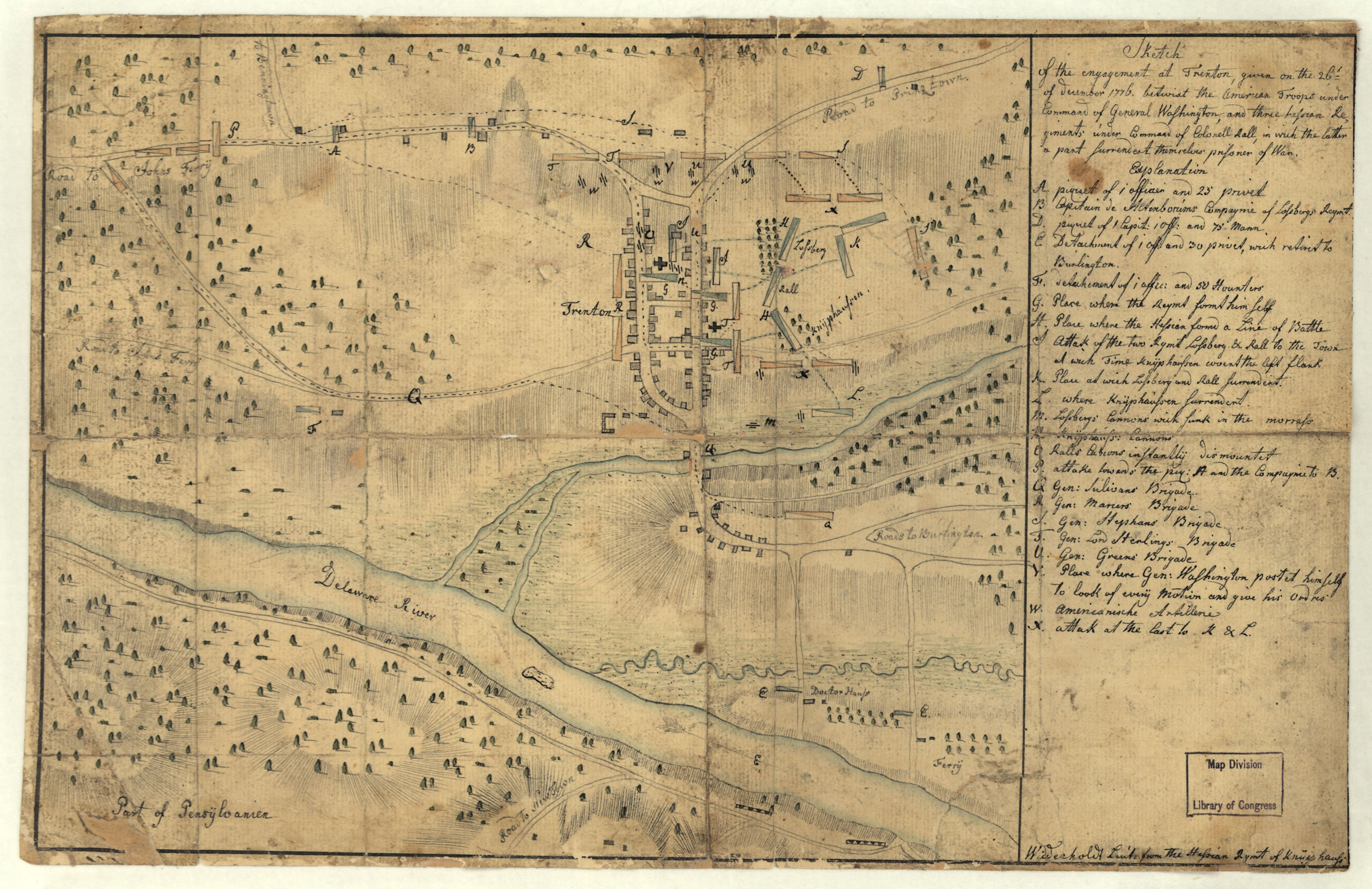
A Hessian's sketch of the Battle of Trenton

After the war broke out in 1775, the British government realized that it would need more troops than it could raise on its own to fight the war, so it sought to hire troops from willing third parties in Europe. All of these hired troops came from German principalities of the Holy Roman Empire. The single largest contingent, with more than 12,000 arriving in North America in 1776, came from the Landgraviate of Hessen-Kassel. The garrison that was quartered at Trenton was a brigade of about 1,400 men, almost all from Hesse-Kassel, under the command of Colonel Johann Rall. The brigade was composed of three regiments, each of which had an artillery company attached. Also included in the brigade were a company of Hessian Jäger (basically light infantry) and a small company from the British 16th (Queen's) Light Dragoons.

The Hessian regiments were named for their formal commanding officers. Since many general officers were also commissioned as colonels of regiments, they were often not present with the regiment, or were busy with their other duties even if the regiment fell under their higher-level command. Since Rall commanded the entire brigade, his regiment's operations were directed by its lieutenant colonel, as were the regiments of Lieutenant Generals Wilhelm von Knyphausen and Friedrich Wilhelm von Lossberg, the second and third ranking general officers in the North American forces of Hesse-Kassel after Lieutenant General Leopold Philip von Heister.

The information in this table is based primarily on the reports of surviving Hessian officers submitted during inquiries into the disaster demanded by Frederick II, the Landgrave of Hesse-Kassel, with some estimates provided by David Hackett Fischer and other historians. The reported strengths do not include the 28 regimental officers. The casualty figures are from an official Hessian return (a formal report on the unit's strength) that also does not include officers. Officers killed or who died of their wounds included Col. Johann Rall and Maj. Friedrich von Dechow, the acting commander of the Knyphausen regiment.

Hessian and British units
Unit	Commander	Unit size	Casualties	Notes
Rall's Brigade	Col. Johann Rall	1,354	17 killed 78 wounded 868 captured	
Grenadier Regiment Rall	Lt. Col. Balthasar Brethauer (acting)	512	12 killed 10 wounded 290 captured	This regiment was the "regiment of the day" and had consequently been on alert. It was part of a counterattack to recover some Hessian guns that had been abandoned, during which Rall went down with a mortal wound.
Fusilier Regiment von Lossberg	Lt. Col. Franz Scheffer (acting)	345	4 killed 55 wounded 260 captured	Lossberg's regiment managed to regroup with Rall in an orchard east of town, and participated in the counterattack to retrieve the Hessian guns. It suffered the highest number of killed and wounded; "lost in this affair 70 killed and wounded".
Fusilier Regiment von Knyphausen	Maj. Friedrich Ludwig von Dechow (acting)	429	1 killed 13 wounded 310 captured	This regiment attempted to escape to the south across the Assunpink Creek, but was blocked first at the bridge and then in attempts to ford the creek. Fifty of its men swam across the icy creek and reached Princeton ten hours later.
Artillery	Lt. Friedrich Fischer	6 guns total; personnel are counted with their assigned regiments	Casualties are counted with their assigned regiments	Many of the artillerymen escaped across the Assunpink Creek bridge after abandoning their guns early in the battle.
Artillery	Lt. Johann Engelhardt	6 guns total; personnel are counted with their assigned regiments	Casualties are counted with their assigned regiments	Many of the artillerymen escaped across the Assunpink Creek bridge after abandoning their guns early in the battle.
Jägers	Lt. Friedrich von Gröthausen	50 estimated	Stryker does not report any casualties for this unit.	This company retreated across the Assunpink Creek bridge after skirmishing with the van of Sullivan's division.
British 16th (Queen's) Light Dragoons	None listed	18 estimated	Stryker does not report any casualties for this unit.	This company was stationed near the Assunpink Creek bridge and escaped across it early in the action.
Totals		1,382	22 killed 83 wounded 891 captured	Unit size includes 28 officers not counted in rank and file. Casualties include the following officer casualties: 5 killed, 5 wounded, 23 captured. Captured includes the wounded; the entire Hessian officer corps was captured or killed.
Unless otherwise cited, the information in this table is provided by Fischer, p. 396.

== Continental Army ==
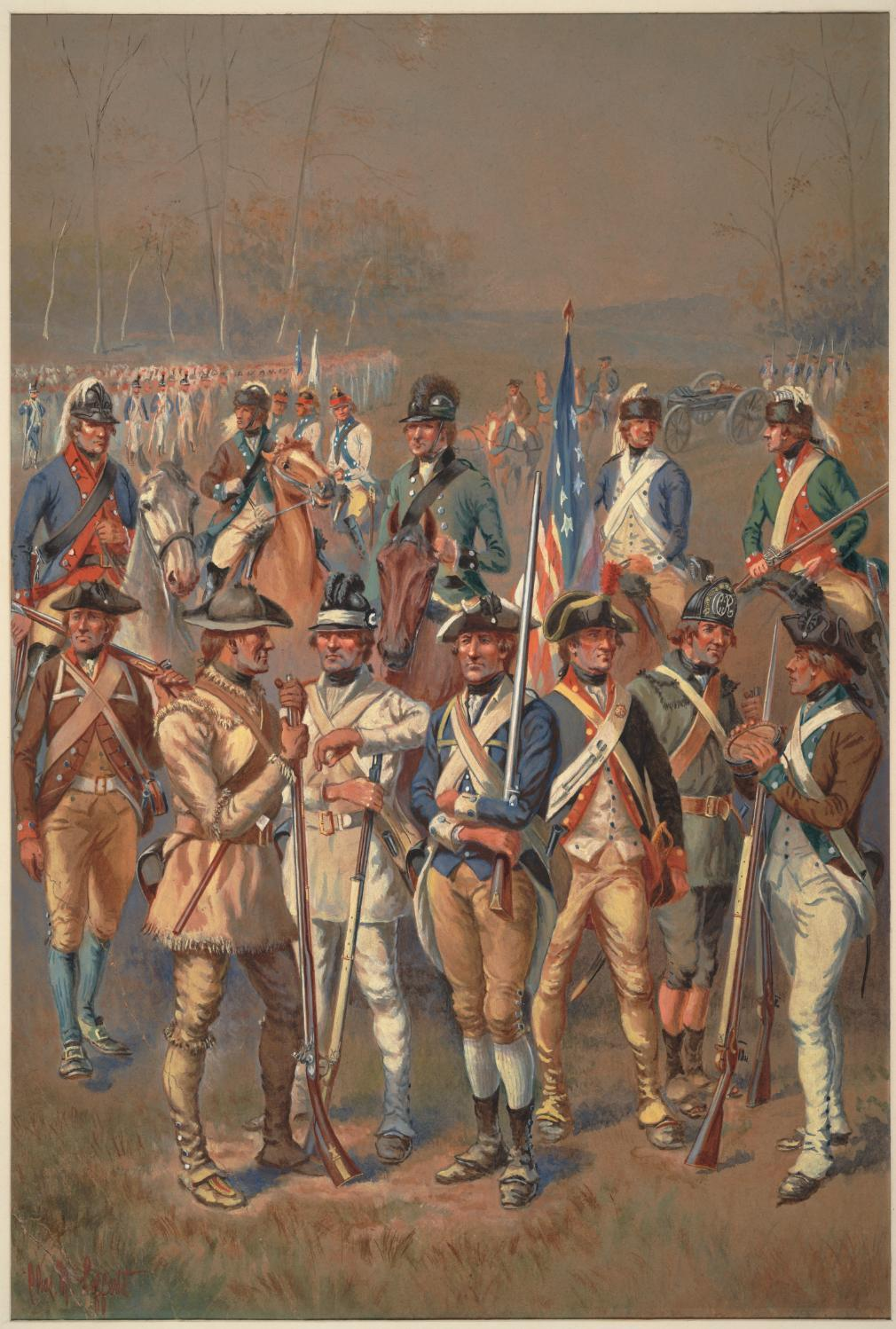
Watercolor by Charles M. Lefferts depicting various Continental Army uniforms

Washington organized his army into two columns for the attack on Trenton. After crossing the Delaware River, Brigadier General Adam Stephen's troops guarded the bridgehead while the remaining troops crossed. The divisions marched together for several miles before taking different roads into Trenton. Stephen's men led Major General Nathanael Greene's division southward along an inland road (which was accompanied by Washington and his entourage), while Major General John Sullivan's division followed a road along the river, intending to prevent the Hessians from retreating across the Assunpink Creek.

Most of the figures in this listing are derived from a return prepared by George Washington on December 22, 1776, four days before the battle. Historian David Hackett Fischer includes estimates made by either himself or other historians for strength counts that were not provided in Washington's return. The counts include all officers and musicians, in addition to the rank and file marked as present and fit for duty. Washington required everyone to carry muskets, including officers and musicians who did not normally carry them. Also, a few Marines under Major Samuel Nicholas were in the battle.

American casualties in the battle were very light, and are therefore not listed in the table below. Two Virginia officers, Capt. William Washington and Lt. James Monroe of the 3rd Virginia Regiment, were injured, as was James Buxton, an ensign in the 4th Virginia Regiment. (Monroe, the future United States president, suffered a wound to the neck that very nearly killed him. His life was saved by a doctor who volunteered his services to the army as it marched through New Jersey that morning.) Two privates are known to have died in the battle, and one account includes mention of two men dying from exposure on the march. The most pessimistic estimate of American casualties lists four killed and eight wounded, although Fischer points out that many more American troops probably died of non-combat causes (including illness, hypothermia, malnutrition, and exhaustion) in the days and weeks following the campaign of late December and early January.

Continental Army
Unit	Commander	Unit size	Notes
Commander-in-Chief	Gen. George Washington		Washington rode with Greene's division, and observed the battle from high ground above the town near the artillery companies.
Commander-in-Chief's Guard	Capt. Caleb Gibbs	about 75	This unit's assigned task was the protection of Washington and his papers.
Secretary	Lt. Col. Robert Hanson Harrison		
Washington's aides-de-camp	Lt. Tench Tilghman		
Washington's aides-de-camp	Lt. Col. Richard Cary		
Washington's aides-de-camp	Lt. Col. Samuel Blachley Webb		
Adjutant General	Col. Joseph Reed		Reed accompanied militia Brig. Gen. John Cadwalader's brigade in its failed crossing of the Delaware.
Quartermaster General	Col. Stephen Moylan		
Commissary General	Lt. Col. Joseph Trumbull		
Paymaster General	Col. William Palfrey		
Muster Master General	Col. Gunning Bedford		
Director of the General Hospital	Dr. John Morgan		
Chief Engineer	Col. Rufus Putnam		
Greene's Division	Maj. Gen. Nathanael Greene	2,690	Washington rode with this division.
Stephen's Brigade	Brig. Gen. Adam Stephen	541	This brigade served as bridgehead and advance guard, and formed part of the center of Greene's line for the attack, along with Stirling's brigade.
4th Virginia Regiment	Lt. Col. Robert Lawson	229	Col. Thomas Elliott was absent.
5th Virginia Regiment	Col. Charles Scott	129	
6th Virginia Regiment	Col. Mordecai Buckner	191	
Stirling's Brigade	Brig. Gen. William Alexander (Lord Stirling)	673	This brigade formed part of the center of Greene's line for the attack, along with Stephen's brigade.
1st Virginia Regiment	Capt. John Fleming	185	No field officers were present.
1st Delaware Regiment	Col. John Haslet	108	Col. Haslet was one of several men that fell into the Delaware during the crossing.
3rd Virginia Regiment	Col. George Weedon	181	
1st Pennsylvania Rifle Regiment	Maj. Ennion Williams	199	Col. Samuel Miles and Lt. Col. James Piper were captured in Battle of Long Island. According to Stryker, this unit included the remnants of Atlee's Pennsylvania State Musketry Battalion (decimated at Long Island), while Fischer places those remnants with the 6th Virginia Regiment.
Mercer's Brigade	Brig. Gen. Hugh Mercer	838	This brigade lined up on Greene's right for the attack.
20th Connecticut Regiment	Col. John Durkee	313	
1st Maryland Regiment	Lt. Col. Francis Ware	163	Col. John Stone was recruiting in Maryland.
5th Massachusetts Regiment	Maj. Ezra Putnam	115	Fischer lists Col. Israel Hutchinson in command; Stryker says Hutchinson and Lt. Col. Benjamin Holden were absent.
Bradley's Battalion, Connecticut State Troops	Capt. Benjamin Mills	142	Fischer lists Col. Philip Burr Bradley in command; Stryker indicates all field officers were absent.
Maryland and Virginia Rifle Regiment	Capt. Alexander Lawson Smith (Maryland element) Capt. Gabriel Long (Virginia element)	105	Lt. Col. Moses Rawlings and Maj. Otho Holland Williams were wounded and captured at the Battle of Fort Washington.
Fermoy's Brigade	Brig. Gen. Matthias Alexis Roche de Fermoy	638	This brigade lined up on Greene's left for the attack. At a key point in the battle, Washington ordered the brigade to extend Greene's line further to its left to avoid a potential flanking maneuver.
1st Pennsylvania Regiment	Col. Edward Hand	254	Hand's men were first assigned to cover the Princeton road.
German Continentals	Col. Nicholas Haussegger	374	Near the end of the battle, these German immigrants called out to the Hessians in German to lay down their weapons.
Sullivan's Division	Maj. Gen. John Sullivan	2,624 estimated	General Sullivan accepted the surrender of Maj. von Dechow, who was mortally wounded and seeking safety.
Glover's Brigade	Col. John Glover	1,259 estimated	This brigade crossed the Assunpink Creek and took up positions on the far side of the bridge to prevent the enemy's escape across the bridge.
14th (Marblehead) Regiment	Maj. William R. Lee		Fischer lists Col. John Glover in command; Stryker says Major Lee commanded while Glover led the brigade.
3rd Massachusetts Regiment	Col. William Shepard		
19th Connecticut Regiment	Col. Charles Webb		
23rd Continental Regiment	Col. John Bailey		
26th Continental Regiment	Col. Loammi Baldwin		
Sargent's Brigade	Col. Paul Dudley Sargent	865 estimated	This brigade also crossed the Assunpink Creek bridge and took up positions above the bridge to catch men trying to ford the creek.
16th Continental Regiment	Capt. James Perry		Fischer lists Sargent in command; Stryker indicates Perry, the next senior officer, commanded while Sargent led the brigade.
Ward's Regiment Connecticut Continentals	Col. Andrew Ward		
6th Battalion Connecticut State Troops	Col. John Chester		Stryker claims this unit did not cross the river.
13th Continental Regiment	Lt. Col. Ebenezer Clap		Col. Joseph Read was absent.
1st Regiment MacDougall's New York Continentals	Capt. John Johnson		The colonelcy was vacant with the promotion of Alexander MacDougall to brigadier general, and the other command positions were also vacant.
3rd New York Regiment	Lt. Col. Baron Friedrich von Weissenfels		Col. Peter Gansevoort was absent.
St. Clair's Brigade	Brig. Gen. Arthur St. Clair	500 estimated	This brigade entered the lower end of town, near the bridge, and engaged the Hessians on King Street.
5th Continental Regiment	Col. John Stark		Stark's men led the initial attack against the jäger outpost on the river road.
8th Continental Regiment	Col. Enoch Poor		
2nd Continental Regiment	Col. Israel Gilman		Stryker lists Gilman as Lt. Col., with a vacant colonelcy. The previous colonel, James Reed had been promoted to brigadier general, and was sick at Peekskill, New York.
15th Continental Regiment	Col. John Paterson		
Artillery	Col. Henry Knox	418 estimated; 16 guns	Knox oversaw and coordinated the crossing of the Delaware River.
New York Company of Continental Artillery	Capt. Sebastian Baumann	3 guns, 80–85 men	Marching with Greene's division, this company and others occupied high ground that commanded Trenton's main roads.
Massachusetts Company of Continental Artillery	Capt. Lt. Winthrop Sargent	2 guns, 55 men estimated	Capt. Thomas Pierce was absent, wounded. This unit marched with Sullivan's division, and was eventually stationed on south shore of the Assunpink Creek. Its gunfire obstructed attempts by the Knyphausen regiment to ford the creek.
New York State Company of Artillery	Capt. Alexander Hamilton	2 guns, 36 men	Marching with Greene's division, this company occupied high ground that commanded Queen Street, one of Trenton's main roads.
Eastern Company, New Jersey State Artillery	Capt. Daniel Neil	2 guns, 63 men	This unit marched with Sullivan's division.
Western Company, New Jersey State Artillery	Capt. Samuel Hugg	2 guns, 55 men estimated	This unit marched with Sullivan's division.
2nd Company, Pennsylvania State Artillery	Capt. Thomas Forrest	2 guns, 52 men	Marching with Greene's division, this company occupied high ground that commanded King Street, one of Trenton's main roads.
2nd Company, Philadelphia Associators	Capt. Joseph Moulder	3 guns, 85 men	This unit marched with Sullivan's division.
Philadelphia Troop of Light Horse	Capt. Samuel Morris	25 cavalry	According to Stryker, this unit rode with Greene's division; it is not clear from sources if it was brigaded in any way. Fischer lists the unit as "not with the Continental Army". Its assignments included patrolling the area around Trenton in the aftermath of the battle and the retreat across the river.
Total Size		5,422 estimated	
Unless otherwise cited, the information in this table is provided by Fischer, pp. 390–393.

== Other American units in the campaign ==
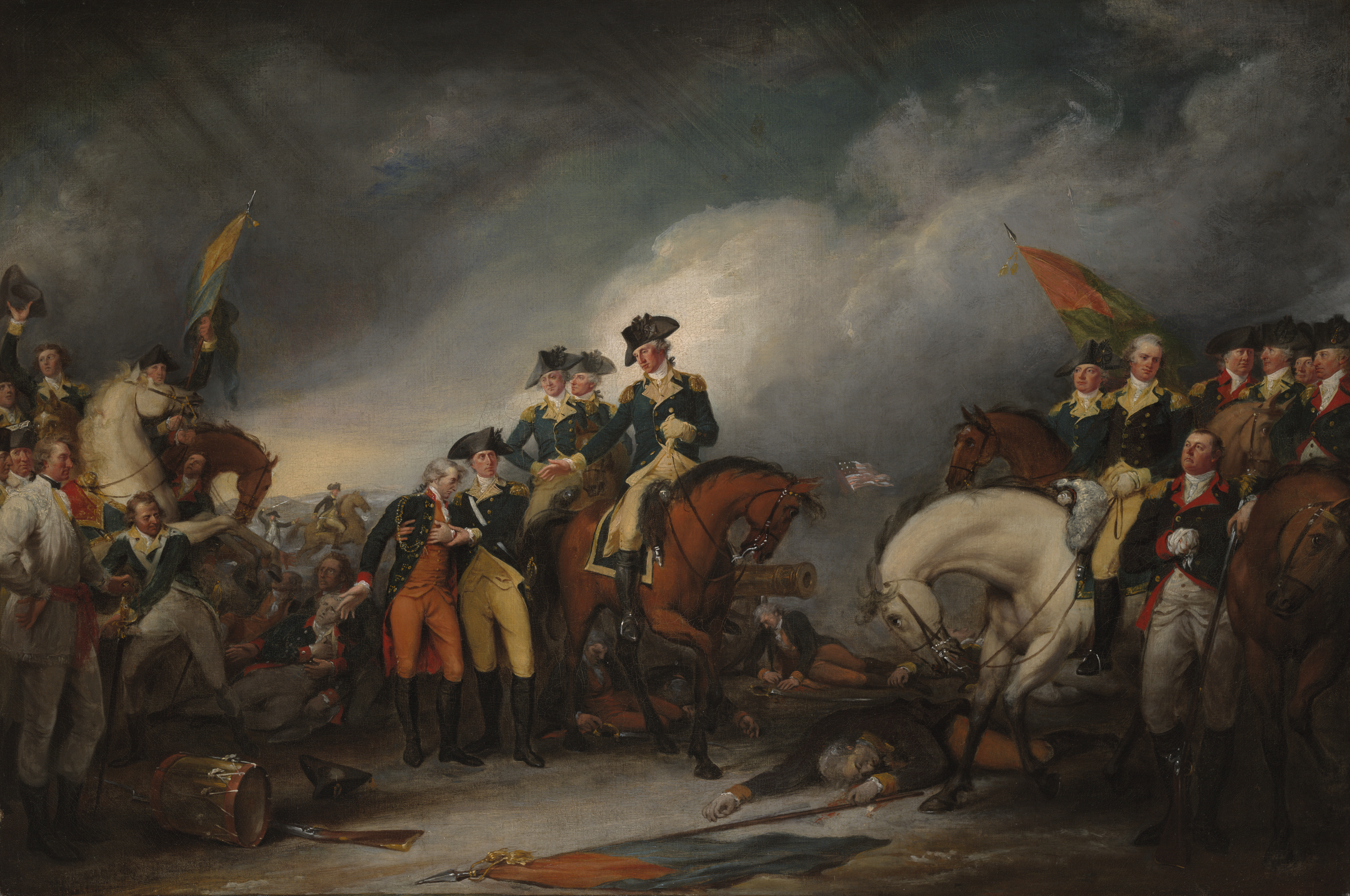
The Capture of the Hessians at Trenton, December 26, 1776 by John Trumbull, 1786–1828

Although the main Continental Army force was the only American formation involved in the attack on Trenton, Washington had planned two additional crossings of the Delaware to assist in the attack. Pennsylvania militia Brigadier General John Cadwalader's brigade, composed of militia companies called associators and a number of smaller Continental Army regiments, did get some units across the river at Dunk's Ferry, but ice jams on the far side made it impossible to cross everyone, including Cadwalader and the artillery, and the effort was abandoned. Pennsylvania brigadier James Ewing was unable to cross any of his troops (militia companies that had been assigned to the reserve force known as the Flying Camp earlier in the year) due to difficult icy conditions at the Trenton Ferry. Ewing's artillery did fire across the river during the battle.

Other American units
Unit	Commander	Unit size	Notes
Cadwalader's Brigade	Brig. Gen. John Cadwalader	2,322 estimated	Some crossed at Dunk's Ferry but then withdrew.
Philadelphia Associators	Capt. George Henry	1,500 estimated	The Associators (or at least some of them) and the Delaware militia were the only troops that successfully crossed the Delaware. They returned after it was clear the artillery could not be crossed, upon which Cadwalader and Hitchcock abandoned the effort.
Morgan's Regiment, Philadelphia Militia	Col. Jacob Morgan		
Bayard's Regiment, Philadelphia Militia	Col. John Bayard		
Cadwalader's Regiment, Philadelphia Militia	Lt. Col. John Nixon		
Matlack's Rifle Battalion, Philadelphia Militia	Col. Timothy Matlack		
Kent County, Delaware Militia Company	Capt. Thomas Rodney		
Two artillery companies			
Hitchcock's Brigade	Col. Daniel Hitchcock	822 estimated	
Nixon's Regiment, Massachusetts Continentals	Col. John Nixon	156	The numbers from Hitchcock's brigade were published in Wright from the General Return of 22 December 1776 and are hard to read.
Varnum's Regiment, Rhode Island Continentals (a.k.a. 9th Continentals)	Col. James Varnum	138	
Hitchcock's Regiment, Rhode Island Continentals (a.k.a. 11th Continentals)	Maj. Israel Angell	114	Angell commanded because Hitchcock led the brigade.
Little's Regiment, Massachusetts Continentals	Lt. Col. William Henshaw	168	Col. Moses Little was sick at Peekskill, New York.
Lippitt's Regiment, Rhode Island Line	Col. Christopher Lippitt	171	Wright called this unit a Continental Army regiment, whereas Fischer listed it as militia. It was, in fact, a militia regiment, originally raised for service in Rhode Island, which had been called into Continental service.
Ewing's Brigade, Pennsylvania Militia of the Flying Camp	Brig. Gen. James Ewing	1,000–1,200	This brigade was to cross at the Trenton Ferry, directly across from the town. Fischer lists fewer units than Stryker does, estimating the brigade to have 826 men.
Cumberland County Regiment	Col. Frederick Watts		
Cumberland County Regiment	Col. William Montgomery		
Lancaster County Regiment	Col. Jacob Klotz		
York County Regiment	Col. Richard McCallister		
Chester County Regiment	Col. James Moore		
Detachment, Bucks County Regiment	Col. Joseph Hart		This unit is not listed by Fischer, but is listed by Stryker as part of Ewing's brigade. Stryker estimates that this unit and Dickinson's New Jersey militia combined numbered between 300 and 500 men.
New Jersey militia	Brig. Gen. Philemon Dickinson		These units are not listed by Fischer, but are listed by Stryker as part of Ewing's brigade.
Detachment, 1st Regiment Hunterdon County, New Jersey militia	Col. Isaac Smith		
Detachment, 2nd Regiment Middlesex County, New Jersey militia	Col. John Neilson		
Unless otherwise cited, the information in this table is provided by Fischer, p. 392.
