= Cato Mead =

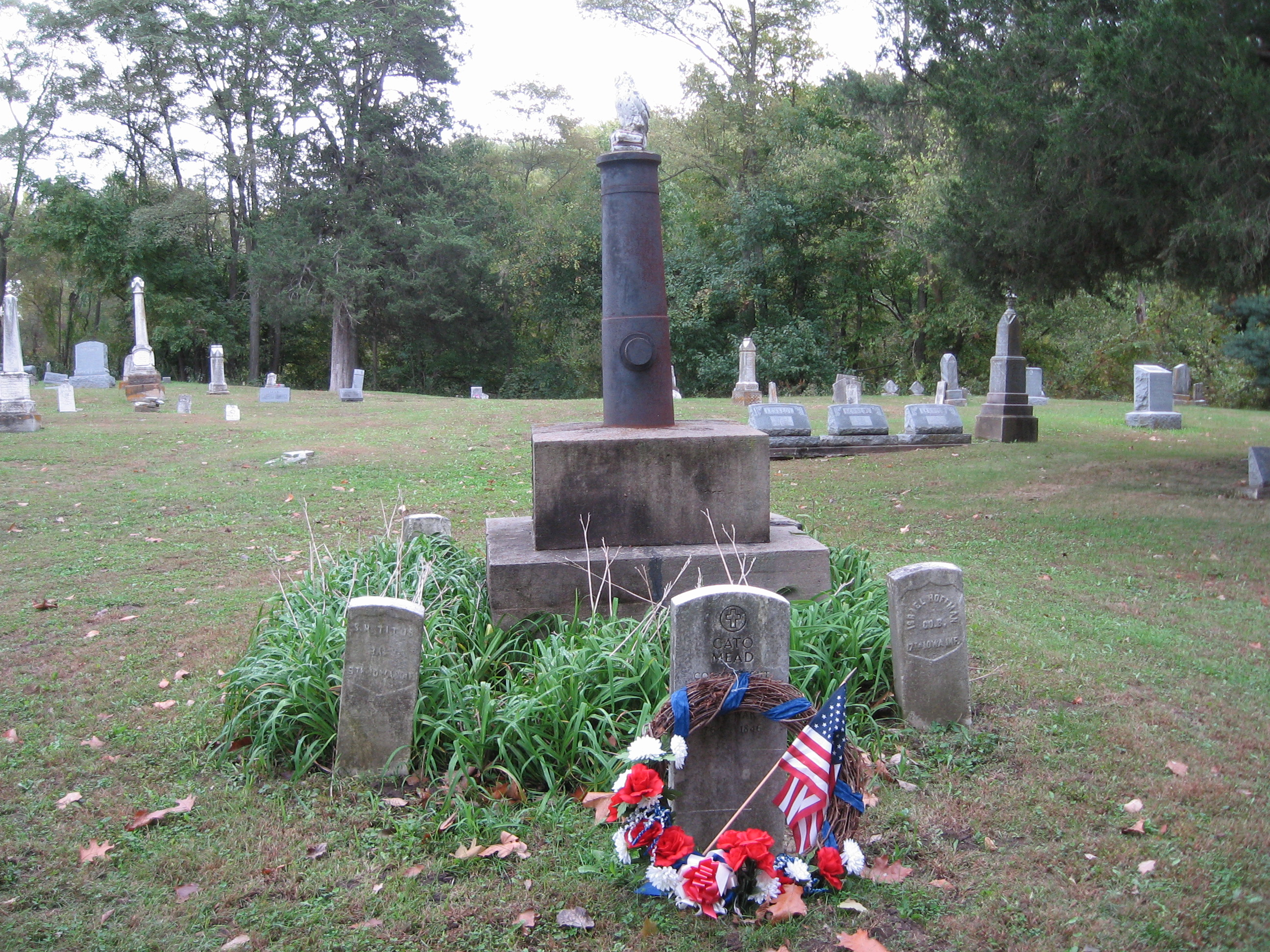
- Cato Mead cemetery marker to an unknown grave in Montrose Cemetery
- Born: 1762 or 1764; Norwich, Connecticut?
- Died: April 25, 1846 (aged 80–82); Montrose, Iowa
- Resting place: In or near Montrose Cemetery, Montrose, Iowa
- Occupations: soldier, farmer, slave?
- Known for: Being the only known African American, Patriot American Revolutionary War veteran buried west of the Mississippi River
- Military career
- Allegiance: United States
- Branch: United States Army Continental Army
- Service years: 1776 or 1777 – ?
- Rank: Private
- Units: Captain John McGregor's Company, 4th Connecticut Regiment
- Conflicts: American Revolutionary War

Cato Mead (c. 1761 – 1846; also spelled Meed) is the only known Black Patriot (American Revolutionary War veteran) buried west of the Mississippi River. Mead is buried in or near Montrose Cemetery in Montrose, Iowa.

According to historian Barbara MacLeish, who is researching a book on Cato Mead, he joined the 4th Connecticut Regiment of the Continental Army commanded by Colonel John Durkee of Norwich, Connecticut in 1776 or 1777. Other sources reveal that Mead was born in 1762 and that he enlisted as a private on March 1, 1778, for a one-year enlistment serving in Captain John McGregor's Company. It is clear he was formerly enslaved according to Norwich Packet newspaper May 17, 1776. He served at Valley Forge from December 1777 through June 1778, where he contracted smallpox, spending two months in a Pennsylvania hospital. Early military records show Mead received solder's pay of $10.04 for service his in the Continental Army in July 1783. It is not known why he migrated to Iowa. While the exact grave location of Cato Mead is unknown, a marker stands at the Montrose Cemetery.

== Sources ==
- Abigail Adams Chapter, Daughters of the American Revolution. Revolutionary War soldiers and patriots buried in Iowa. 1978.
- Pierce's Register: Register of the Certificates Issued by John Pierce, Esquire, Paymaster General and Commissioner of Army Accounts for the United States, to Officers and Soldiers of the Continental Army Under Act of July 4, 1783, Issue 2 Volume 9, Issue 988 of Document, United States 63d Cong., 3d sess., 1915.
