= Battle of White Plains =

1776 battle near White Plains, New York

- Part of the New York and New Jersey campaign
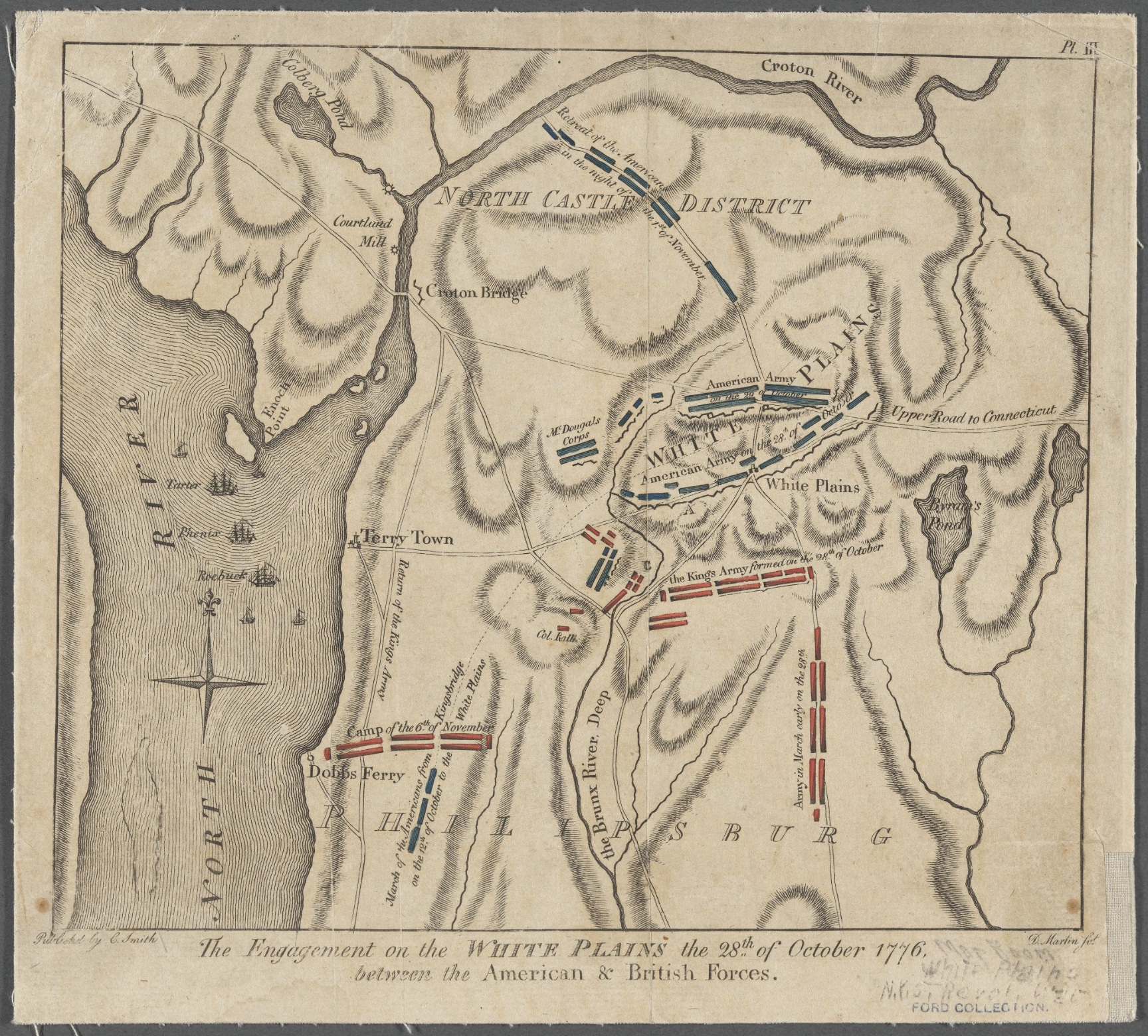
- c. 1792 map of the battle
Date	October 28, 1776
Location	White Plains, New York 41°02′N 73°47′W
Result	British victory

Belligerents
Great Britain; Hesse-Kassel	United States

Commanders and leaders
William Howe; Alexander Leslie; Johann Rall; Carl von Donop	George Washington; Alexander Hamilton; Alexander McDougall; Joseph Spencer

Strength
4,000–7,500 men	3,100 men

Casualties and losses
48 killed; 182 wounded; 4 missing	50–150+ killed; 150+ wounded; 1 missing; 16 captured

The Battle of White Plains took place during the New York and New Jersey campaign of the American Revolutionary War on October 28, 1776, near White Plains, New York. Following the retreat of George Washington's Continental Army northward from New York City, British General William Howe landed troops in Westchester County, intending to cut off Washington's escape route. Alerted to this move, Washington retreated farther, establishing a position in the village of White Plains but failing to establish firm control over local high ground.

Howe's troops drove Washington's troops from a mountain near the village; following this loss, Washington ordered the Americans to retreat farther north. Later British movements chased Washington across New Jersey and into Pennsylvania. Washington then crossed the Delaware and surprised a brigade of Hessian troops in the December 26 Battle of Trenton.

== Background ==
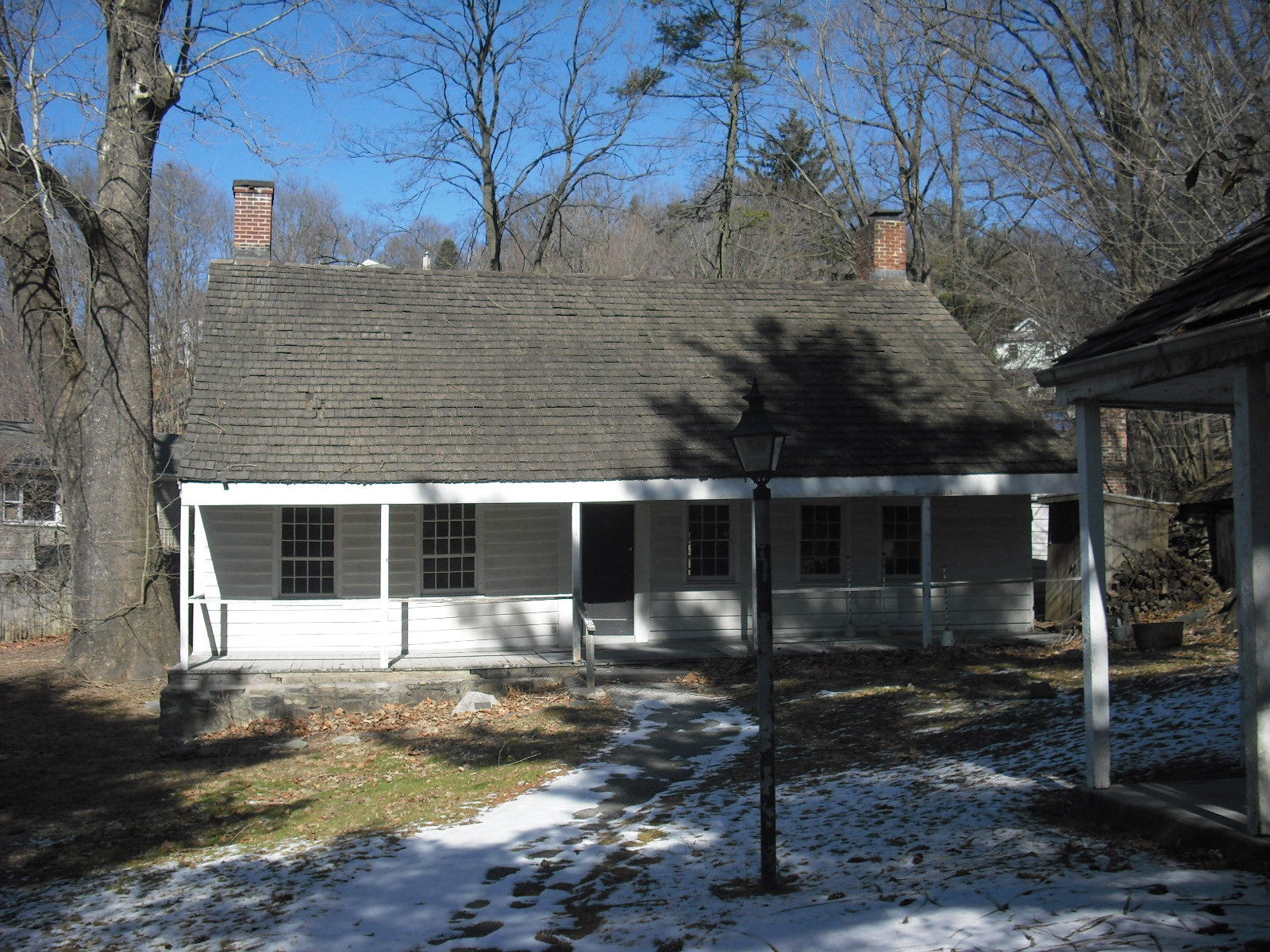
The Elijah Miller House, which served as George Washington's headquarters in White Plains

British General William Howe, after evacuating Boston in March 1776, regrouped in Halifax, Nova Scotia, and embarked in June on a campaign to gain control of New York City. The campaign began with an unopposed landing on Staten Island in early July. British troops made another unopposed landing, on Long Island, on August 22, south of the areas where General George Washington's Continental Army had organized significant defenses around Brooklyn Heights.

After losing the Battle of Long Island on August 27, Washington and his army of 9,000 troops escaped on the night of August 29–30 to York Island (as Manhattan was then called). Howe followed up with a landing on Manhattan on September 15, but his advance was checked the next day at Harlem Heights. After an abortive landing at Throg's Neck, he landed troops with some resistance at Pell's Point on October 18 to begin an encircling maneuver that was intended to trap Washington's army between that force, his troops in Manhattan, and the Hudson River, which was dominated by warships of the Royal Navy. Howe established a camp at New Rochelle, but advance elements of his army were near Mamaroneck, only 7 miles (11 km) from White Plains, where there was a lightly defended Continental Army supply depot.

On October 20, Washington sent Colonel Rufus Putnam out on a reconnaissance mission from his camp at Harlem Heights. Putnam discovered the general placement of the British troop locations and recognized the danger to the army and its supplies. When he reported this to Washington that evening, Washington immediately dispatched Putnam with orders to Lord Stirling, whose troops were furthest north, to immediately march to White Plains. They arrived at White Plains at 9:00 am on October 21, and were followed by other units of the army as the day progressed. Washington decided to withdraw most of the army to White Plains, leaving a garrison of 1,200 men under Nathanael Greene to defend Fort Washington on Manhattan.

Howe's army advanced slowly, with troops from his center and right moving along the road from New Rochelle to White Plains, while a unit of Loyalists occupied Mamaroneck. The latter was attacked that night by a detachment of Lord Stirling's troops under John Haslet, who took more than thirty prisoners as well as supplies, but suffered several killed and 15 wounded. As a result, Howe moved elements of his right wing to occupy Mamaroneck. On October 22, Howe was reinforced by the landing at New Rochelle of an additional 8,000 troops under the command of Wilhelm von Knyphausen.

Washington established his headquarters at the Elijah Miller House in North White Plains on October 23, and chose a defensive position that he fortified with two lines of entrenchments. The trenches were situated on raised terrain, protected on the right by the swampy ground near the Bronx River, with steeper hills further back as a place of retreat. The American defenses were 3 miles (4.8 km) long. Beyond that, on the right, was Chatterton's Hill, which commanded the plain over which the British would have to advance. The hill was initially occupied by militia companies numbering several hundred, probably including John Brooks' Massachusetts militia company.

On October 24 and 25, Howe's army moved from New Rochelle to Scarsdale, where they established a camp covering the eastern bank of the Bronx River. This move was apparently made in the hopes of catching Charles Lee's column, which had to alter its route toward White Plains and execute a forced march at night to avoid them. Howe remained at Scarsdale until the morning of October 28, when his forces marched toward White Plains, with British troops on the right under General Henry Clinton, and primarily Hessian troops on the left under General von Heister.

== Order of battle ==
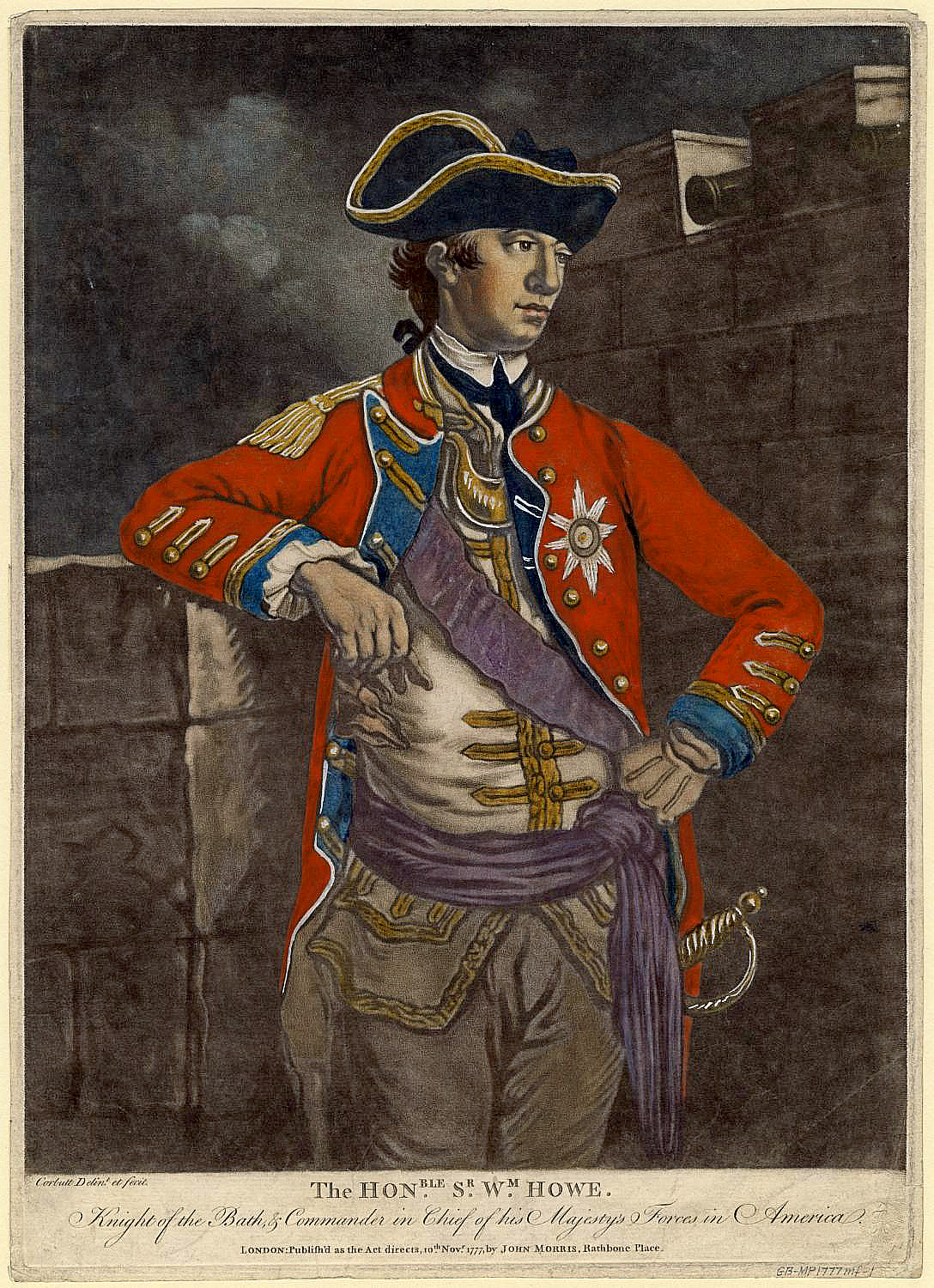
c. 1777 portrait of William Howe

=== British and Hessians ===
British

British troops involved included:

- 16th Regiment of (Light) Dragoons
- 17th Regiment of (Light) Dragoons
- 1st Battalion, Guards Brigade
- 2nd Battalion, Guards Brigade
- 5th Regiment of Foot (Northumberland Fusiliers)
- 23rd Regiment of Foot (Royal Welsh Fusiliers)
- 27th Regiment of Foot
- 28th Regiment of Foot
- 35th Regiment of Foot
- 42nd (Royal Highland, The Black Watch) Regiment of Foot
- 49th Regiment of Foot
- 52nd Regiment of Foot
- No.1 Company, 4th Battalion, Royal Artillery
- No.2 Company, 4th Battalion, Royal Artillery
- No.4 Company, 4th Battalion, Royal Artillery (specially thanked in general orders)
- No.5 Company, 4th Battalion, Royal Artillery (thanked in general orders)
- No.8 Company, 4th Battalion, Royal Artillery (thanked in general orders)

Hessians

- Grenadier Regiment von Rahl
- Fusilier Regiment von Knyphausen

=== Americans ===
American (continental) forces in the battle included:

- Spencer's Division
  - Parson's Brigade under Brigadier General Samuel Holden Parsons
    - 10th Continental Regiment (6th Connecticut)
    - 20th Continental Regiment (20th Connecticut)
    - 21st Continental Regiment (Ward's Militia)
  - Wadsworth's Brigade under Brigadier General James Wadsworth
    - Gay's Battalion
    - Selden's Battalion
    - Douglas' Battalion
- Delaware Regiment
- 1st New York Regiment
- 3rd New York Regiment
- Maryland Regiment
- Connecticut Regiment
- Brook's New York Militia
- Graham's Massachusetts Militia
- 10th Albany Regiment (Manor of Livingston Regiment) New York

== Battle ==
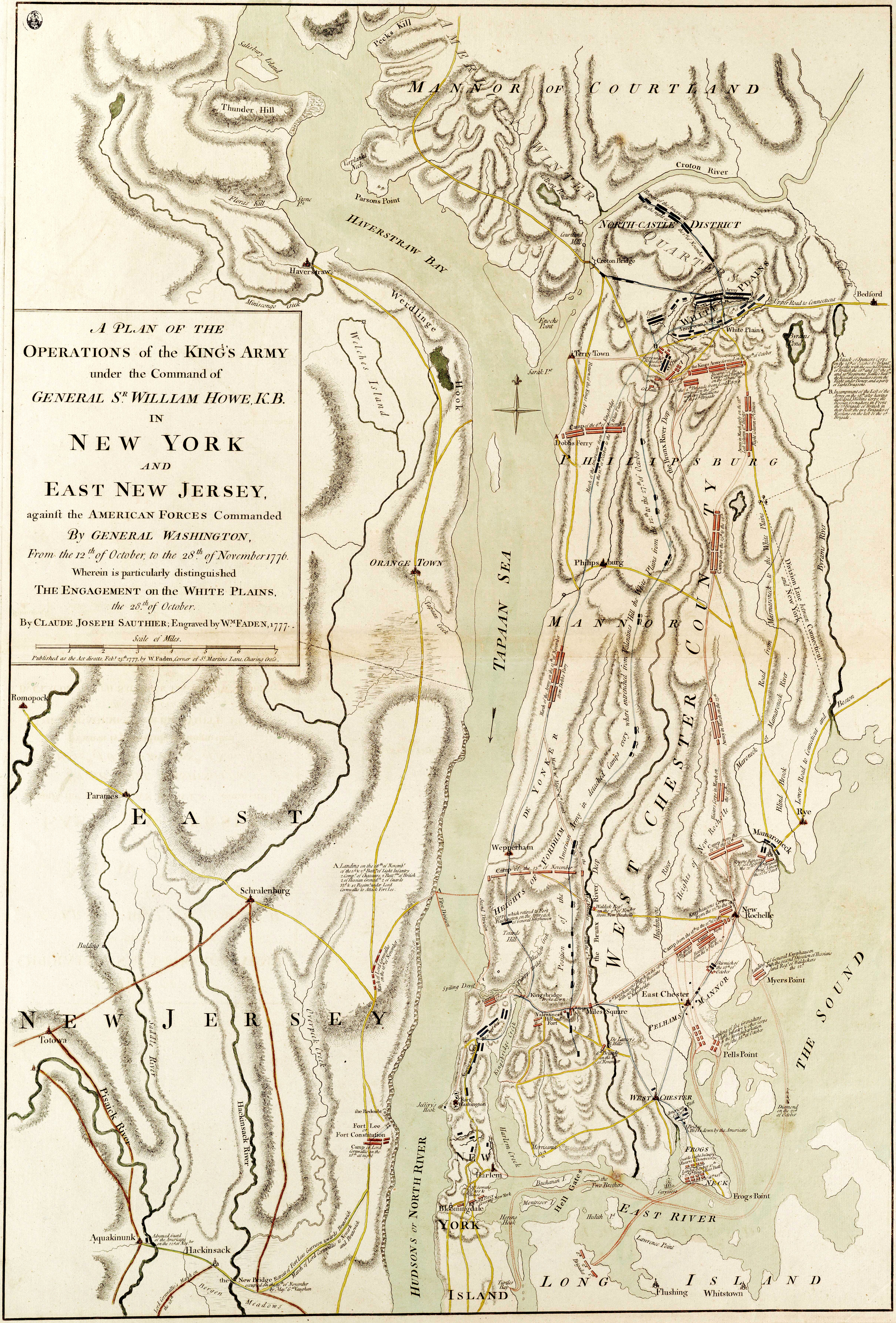
Map depicting troop movements before, during, and after the battle

While Washington was inspecting the terrain to determine where it was best to station his troops, messengers alerted him that the British were advancing. Returning to his headquarters, he ordered the 2nd Connecticut Regiment under Joseph Spencer out to slow the British advance, and sent Haslet and the 1st Delaware Regiment, along with Alexander McDougall's brigade (Rudolphus Ritzema's 3rd New York Regiment, Charles Webb's 19th Continental Regiment, William Smallwood's 1st Maryland Regiment, and the 1st New York Regiment and 2nd New York Regiments) to reinforce Chatterton Hill.

Spencer's force advanced to a position on the old York road at Hart's corners (Hartsdale, New York) and there exchanged fire with the Hessians led by Colonel Johann Rall that were at the head of the British left column. When Clinton's column threatened their flank, these companies were forced into a retreat across the Bronx River that was initially orderly with pauses to fire from behind stone walls while fire from the troops on Chatterton Hill covered their move, but turned into a rout with the appearance of dragoons. Rall's troops attempted to gain the hill, but were repelled by fire from Haslet's troops and the militia, and retreated to a nearby hilltop on the same side of the river. This concerted defense brought the entire British Army, which was maneuvering as if to attack the entire American line, to a stop.

While Howe and his command conferred, the Hessian artillery on the left opened fire on the hilltop position, where they succeeded in driving the militia into a panicked retreat. The arrival of McDougall and his brigade helped to rally them, and a defensive line was established, with the militia on the right and the Continentals arrayed along the top of the hill. Howe finally issued orders, and while most of his army waited, a detachment of British and Hessian troops was sent to take the hill.

The British attack was organized with Hessian regiments leading the assault. Rall was to charge the American right, while a Hessian battalion under Colonel Carl von Donop (consisting of the Linsing, Minnigerode, Lengerke and Kochler grenadiers, and Donop's own chasseur regiment) was to attack the center. A British column under General Alexander Leslie (consisting of the 5th, 28th, 35th, and 49th foot) was to attack the right. Donop's force either had difficulty crossing the river or was reluctant to do so, and elements of the British force were the first to cross. Rall's charge scattered the militia on the American right, leaving the flank of the Maryland and New York regiments exposed as they poured musket fire onto the British attackers, which temporarily halted their advance. The exposure of their flank caused them to begin a fighting retreat, which progressively forced the remainder of the American line, which had engaged with the other segments of the British force, to give way and retreat. Haslet's Delaware regiment, which anchored the American left, provided covering fire while the remaining troops retreated to the north, and were the last to leave the hill. The fighting was intense, and both sides suffered significant casualties before the Continentals made a disciplined retreat.

== Aftermath ==
American color captured by Hessian troops at White Plains or Long Island

John Fortescue's History of the British Army says that Howe's casualties numbered 214 British and 99 Hessians. However, Rodney Atwood points out that Fortescue's figure for the Hessians includes the entire Hessian casualties from 19 to 28 October and that in fact only 53 of these casualties were incurred at the Battle of White Plains. This revised figure would give a total of 267 British and Hessians killed, wounded or missing at White Plains. Henry Dawson, on the other hand, gives Howe's loss as 47 killed, 182 wounded and four missing. The American loss is uncertain. Theodore Savas and J. David Dameron give a range of 150–500 killed, wounded and captured. Samuel Roads numbers the casualties of 47 killed and 70 wounded. Henry Dawson estimates 50 killed, 150 wounded and 17 missing for McDougall's and Spencer's commands but has no information on the losses in Haslet's regiment.

The two generals remained where they were for two days, while Howe reinforced the position on Chatterton Hill, and Washington organized his army for retreat into the hills. With the arrival of additional Hessian and Waldeck troops under Lord Percy on October 30, Howe planned to act against the Americans the following day. However, a heavy rain fell the whole next day, and when Howe was finally prepared to act, he awoke to find that Washington had again eluded his grasp. Washington withdrew his army into the hills to the north on the night of October 31, establishing a camp near North Castle. Howe chose not to follow, instead attempting without success to draw Washington out. On November 5, he turned his army south to finish evicting Continental Army troops from Manhattan, a task he accomplished with the November 16 Battle of Fort Washington. Washington eventually crossed the Hudson River at Peekskill with most of his army, leaving New England regiments behind to guard supply stores and important river crossings. Later, British movements chased him across New Jersey and into Pennsylvania, and the British established a chain of outposts across New Jersey. Washington, seeing an opportunity for a victory to boost the nation's morale, crossed the Delaware and surprised Rall's troops in the December 26 Battle of Trenton.

== Legacy ==
Each year on or near the anniversary date, the White Plains Historical Society hosts a commemoration of the event at the Jacob Purdy House in White Plains, New York. Two ships in the United States Navy were named for the Battle of White Plains. CVE-66 was an escort carrier in World War II. AFS-4 was a combat stores ship that was decommissioned in 1995.

According to some historians, the Headless Horseman depicted in Washington Irving's short story "The Legend of Sleepy Hollow" was inspired by a real-life Hessian soldier who lost his head by cannon fire during this battle.

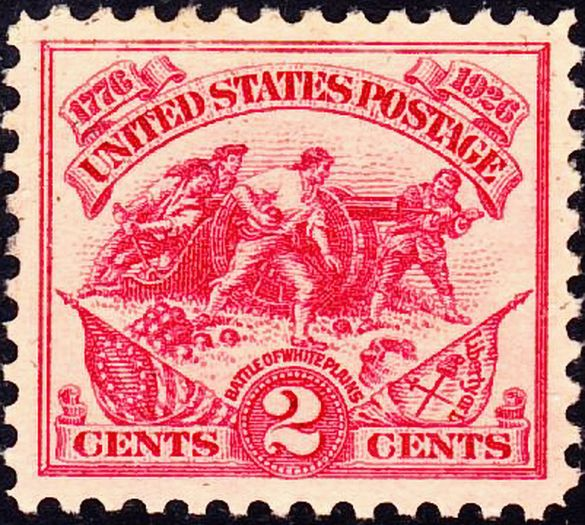
~ Battle of White Plains ~
150th Anniversary Issue of 1926

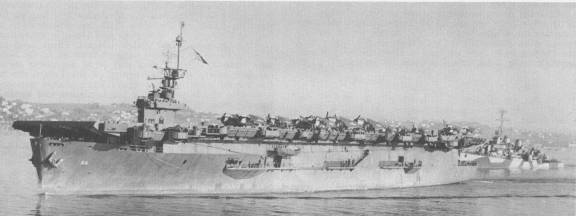
USS White Plains (CVE-66)

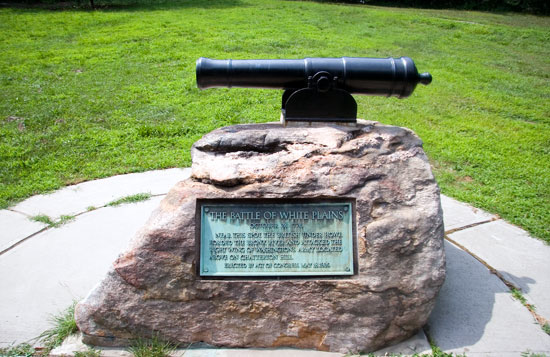
Battle of White Plains Historic Site

== See also ==
- List of American Revolutionary War battles
- Neutral Ground of Westchester County in the Revolutionary War
- American Revolutionary War § British New York counter-offensive. The 'Battle of White Plains' placed in overall sequence and strategic context.

== Bibliography ==
- Alden, John (1989). A History of the American Revolution. Da Capo Press. ISBN 978-0-306-80366-6.
- Atwood, Rodney (1980). The Hessians: Mercenaries from Hessen-Kassel in American Revolution. Cambridge University Press. ISBN 0-8061-2530-6.
- Dawson, Henry Barton (1886). Westchester County, New York in the American Revolution. Morrisania, New York: self-published. p. 259. "chatterton."
- Boatner, Mark Mayo (1966). Cassell's Biographical Dictionary of the American War of Independence, 1763–1783. London: Cassell and Company, Ltd.
- Major Francis Duncan (1873). History of the Royal Regiment of Artillery, Volume II. London: John Murray.
- Fischer, David Hackett (2004). Washington's Crossing. New York: Oxford University Press. ISBN 978-0-19-517034-4. OCLC 186017328.
- Greene, Francis Vinton (1911). The Revolutionary War and the Military Policy of the United States. Charles Scribner's Sons. Archived from the original on July 19, 2009 – via Questia.
- Lengel, Edward (2005). General George Washington. New York: Random House Paperbacks. ISBN 9781400060818.
- Roads, Samuel Jr. (1880). The History and Traditions of Marblehead. Boston: Osgood.
- Savas, Theodore P.; Dameron, J. David (2006). A Guide to the Battles of the American Revolution. New York and El Dorado Hills, CA: Savas Beattie LLC. ISBN 978-1-932714-12-8.
- Schecter, Barton (2002). The Battle for New York. New York: Walker. ISBN 0-8027-1374-2.
- Digby Smith, Kevin E. Kiley, and Jeremy Black (2017). An Illustrated Encyclopedia of Uniforms of the American War of Independence. London: Lorenz Books. ISBN 978-0-7548-1761-1.
- "White Plains Historical Society Event Calendar". White Plains Historical Society. Archived from the original on October 30, 2010.
