= 3rd Connecticut Regiment =

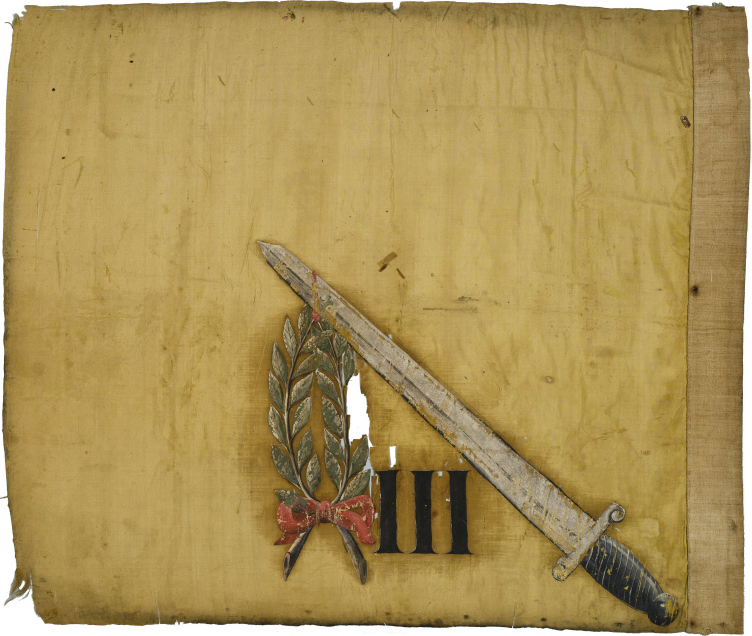
- Company flag of the 3rd Connecticut Regiment
- Active: 1776–1781
- Allegiance: Continental Congress of the United States
- Branch: Infantry
- Size: 728 soldiers
- Part of: Connecticut Line
- Engagements: American Revolutionary War: New York

Commanders
- Colonel: Samuel Wyllys; Durkee; Grosvenor; Zebulon Butler; Swift

The 3rd Connecticut Regiment was authorized on 16 September 1776 and was organized between 1 January - April 1777 of eight companies of volunteers from the counties of Windham and Hartford in the state of Connecticut.

On 3 April 1777 it was assigned to the 1st Connecticut Brigade in the Highland's Department. The brigade was reassigned to the Main Continental Army on 15 June 1777 and reassigned back to the Highland's Department on 2 July 1777.

One year later, 21 July 1778 the Brigade was reassigned to the Main Continental Army. On 28 May 1779 the Brigade was reassigned to the Highland's Department and 11 July 1779 the regiment was re-organized to nine companies.

On 16 November 1780 the brigade was reassigned to the Main Continental Army; but later that, 27 November 1780 it was reassigned back to the Highland's Department.

On 1 January 1781 the regiment was merged with the 4th Connecticut Regiment, re-organized to nine companies and re-designated as the 1st Connecticut Regiment{1781-1783}.

The regiment would see action in the New York Campaign.

== See also ==
- 3rd Connecticut Infantry Regiment - Civil War unit with this designation
- 3rd Connecticut Regiment (1775)
- 20th Continental Regiment
