= Connecticut Line =

American Revolutionary War military formation

The Connecticut Line was a formation within the Continental Army. The term "Connecticut Line" referred to the quota of numbered infantry regiments assigned to Connecticut at various times by the Continental Congress, the size of its allocation determined by the size of its population relative to that of other states. These, together with similarly apportioned contingents from the other twelve states, formed the Continental Line. The concept was particularly important in relation to the promotion of commissioned officers. Officers of the Continental Army below the rank of brigadier general were ordinarily ineligible for promotion except in the line of their own state.

In the course of the war, 27 infantry regiments were assigned to the Connecticut Line. This included the eight provincial regiments of 1775, Wooster's Provisional Regiment (formed by consolidation of the remnants of the original 1st, 4th, and 5th Regiments), the five numbered Continental regiments of 1776, the eight Connecticut regiments of 1777, S.B. Webb's Additional Continental Regiment, which later became the 9th Connecticut Regiment, and four new regiments created by consolidation in 1781.

Not all Continental infantry regiments raised in a state were part of a state quota, however. On December 27, 1776, the Continental Congress gave Washington temporary control over certain military decisions that the Congress ordinarily regarded as its own prerogative. These “dictatorial powers” included the authority to raise sixteen additional Continental infantry regiments at large.

Early in 1777, Washington offered command of one of these additional regiments to Samuel Blatchley Webb, who accepted. Webb had formerly served as one of Washington's personal aides. Webb's Regiment was allotted to the Connecticut Line on July 24, 1780, and officially designated the 9th Connecticut Regiment. The 9th Connecticut Regiment was consolidated with the 2nd Connecticut Regiment on January 1, 1781.

Half of Sherburne's Additional Continental Regiment was drawn Rhode Island and half from Connecticut.

Still other Continental infantry regiments and smaller units, also unrelated to a state quota, were raised as needed for special or temporary service. Elmore's Regiment, raised in 1776 for the defense of Canada, was an example of such an “extra” regiment.

== Connecticut Provincial Regiments, 1775 ==
On April 23, 1775, the Massachusetts Provincial Congress voted to raise a volunteer force of 13,600 men, and it called upon the other New England colonies for assistance in raising an army of 30,000 men.

In response, the Connecticut Assembly voted, on April 27, 1775, to contribute 6,000 men to this army. The Connecticut troops were formed into six infantry regiments. Connecticut infantry regiments had an official establishment of 1,046 officers and men in ten companies. The troops were enlisted to serve until December 10, 1775.

The New England delegates to the Continental Congress urged that the Congress assume responsibility for the provincial troops of New Hampshire, Massachusetts, Rhode Island, and Connecticut, that were blockading Boston. This was done on June 14, 1775, and these troops were designated the Continental Army. George Washington was selected as commander in chief of this force, and all other Continental Army troops, the following day.

In an effort to weld the separate New England armies into a single "Continental" Army, on August 5, 1775, General Washington ordered that a board be convened to determine the rank of the regiments at Boston. The board was to consist of a brigadier general as moderator and six field officers as members. It completed its task on August 20, 1775, and reported its decision to Washington. The regiments of infantry in the Continental Army were accordingly numbered without reference to their colony of origin. There were thirty-nine "Regiments of Foot in the Army of the United Colonies." In General Orders, Washington often referred to his regiments by these numbers; and they appear in the strength reports compiled by Adjutant General Horatio Gates.

The 1st Connecticut Provincial Regiment (1775) was commanded by Colonel David Wooster. Wooster's Regiment was assigned to the Separate, or New York, Department in 1775 and did not receive an additional designation in August.

The 2d Connecticut Provincial Regiment (1775) was commanded by Colonel Joseph Spencer. In August 1775, Spencer's Regiment was designated "The 33d Regiment of Foot."

The 3d Connecticut Provincial Regiment (1775) was commanded by Colonel Israel Putnam. In August 1775, Putnam's Regiment was designated "The 34th Regiment of Foot."

The 4th Connecticut Provincial Regiment (1775) was commanded by Colonel Benjamin Hinman. Hinman's Regiment was assigned to the Separate, or New York, Department in 1775 and did not receive an additional designation in August.

The 5th Connecticut Provincial Regiment (1775) was commanded by Colonel David Waterbury. Waterbury's Regiment was assigned to the Separate, or New York, Department in 1775 and did not receive an additional designation in August.

The 6th Connecticut Provincial Regiment (1775) was commanded by Colonel Samuel Holden Parsons. In August 1775, Parsons' Regiment was designated "The 13th Regiment of Foot."

Massachusetts requested reinforcements from the other New England colonies following the Battle of Bunker Hill. Connecticut responded by raising two more infantry regiments. They were authorized by the Connecticut Assembly on July 1, 1775, and placed on the Continental establishment on July 19, 1775,

The 7th Connecticut Provincial Regiment (1775) was commanded by Colonel Charles Webb. In August 1775, Charles Webb's Regiment was designated "The 39th Regiment of Foot."

The 8th Connecticut Provincial Regiment (1775) was commanded by Colonel Jedediah Huntington. In August 1775, Huntington's Regiment was designated "The 29th Regiment of Foot."

== Numbered Continental Regiments, 1776 ==
On November 4, 1775, the Continental Congress resolved that on January 1, 1776, the Continental Army, exclusive of artillery and extra regiments, should consist of 27 infantry regiments. The troops were to be enlisted to serve until December 31, 1776. The quota of regiments assigned to the states was 1 from Pennsylvania, 3 from New Hampshire, 16 from Massachusetts, 2 from Rhode Island, and 5 from Connecticut.

Each regiment was to have an official establishment of 728 officers and men in eight companies.

The regiments were to receive numbers instead of names. For the campaign of 1776 Connecticut was to provide the 10th, 17th, 19th, 20th, and 22d Continental Regiments.

- The 10th Continental Regiment was commanded by Colonel Samuel Holden Parsons from 1 January to 9 August 1776. Parsons became a brigadier general in the Continental Army on the latter date. John Tyler, who had been the lieutenant colonel of the regiment since 1 January 1776, served as its colonel from 10 August to 31 December 1776.
- The 17th Continental Regiment was commanded by Colonel Jedediah Huntington from 1 January to 31 December 1776.
- The 19th Continental Regiment was commanded by Colonel Charles Webb from 1 January to 31 December 1776. Nathan Hale, who was captured by the British and hanged as a spy on 22 September 1776, was one of the captains in this regiment.
- The 20th Continental Regiment was commanded by John Durkee, with the rank of lieutenant colonel from 1 January to 12 August 1776 and with the rank of colonel from 12 August to 31 December 1776. Benedict Arnold had been appointed the colonel of this regiment as of 1 January 1776, but on that date he was serving in Quebec and, on 10 January 1776 he was made a brigadier general in the Continental Army.
- The 22nd Continental Regiment was commanded by Colonel Samuel Wyllys from 1 January to 31 December 1776.

== Connecticut Line, 1777 ==
During 1776, the Continental Congress gradually overcame its ideological objections to a standing army, and, on September 16, 1776, it resolved that, on January 1, 1777, the Continental Line should consist of 88 infantry regiments, to be maintained for the duration of the war.

The quota of regiments assigned to the states was 3 from New Hampshire, 15 from Massachusetts, 2 from Rhode Island, 8 from Connecticut, 4 from New York, 4 from New Jersey, 12 from Pennsylvania, 1 from Delaware, 8 from Maryland, 15 from Virginia, 9 from North Carolina, 6 from South Carolina, and 1 from Georgia.

The quotas for states outside New England included regiments that had been on the Continental establishment earlier, but the term Continental Line was now broadened to include the lines of all the states.

- The 1st Connecticut Regiment (1777) was commanded by Colonel Jedediah Huntington from 1 January to 12 May 1777. On the latter date, Colonel Huntington became a brigadier general in the Continental Army. He was succeeded, on 27 May 1777, by Colonel Josiah Starr, who served as the regiment's colonel until 1 January 1781
- The 2nd Connecticut Regiment (1777) was commanded by Colonel Charles Webb from 1 January 1777 until his resignation on 13 March 1778. The regiment was commanded by Colonel Zebulon Butler from 13 March 1778 to 1 January 1781.
- The 3rd Connecticut Regiment (1777) was commanded by Colonel Samuel Wyllys from 1 January 1777 to 1 January 1781.
- The 4th Connecticut Regiment (1777) was commanded by Colonel John Durkee from 1 January 1777 to 1 January 1781. Colonel Durkee was wounded at the Battle of Monmouth.
- The 5th Connecticut Regiment (1777) was commanded by Colonel Philip Burr Bradley from 1 January 1777 to 1 January 1781.
- The 6th Connecticut Regiment (1777) was commanded by Colonel William Douglas from 1 January 1777 until his death on 28 May 1777. Colonel Douglas had been an aide de camp to General Wooster, and had been wounded at Harlem Plains on 16 September 1776. The regiment was commanded by Colonel Return Jonathan Meigs from May 1777 until 1 January 1781.
- The 7th Connecticut Regiment (1777) was commanded by Colonel Heman Swift from 1 January 1777 to 1 January 1781.
- The 8th Connecticut Regiment (1777) was commanded by Colonel John Chandler from 1 January 1777 until his resignation on 5 March 1778. He was succeeded on the latter date by Colonel Giles Russell, who died on 28 October 1779. The regiment was commanded by Lieutenant Colonel Isaac Sherman [son of American founding father Roger Sherman] from 28 October 1779 to 1 January 1781.

== Reorganization of the Connecticut Line, 1778-1779 ==
While the Main Army, that portion of Washington's army under his immediate command, was in winter quarters at Valley Forge, the Congress acted to reduce the size and increase the tactical efficiency of the Continental Army.

On May 27, 1778, it resolved that the number of infantry regiments be reduced from 88 to 80. The quota of regiments assigned to the states was 3 from New Hampshire, 15 from Massachusetts, 2 from Rhode Island, 8 from Connecticut, 5 from New York, 3 from New Jersey, 11 from Pennsylvania, 1 from Delaware, 8 from Maryland, 11 from Virginia, 6 from North Carolina, 6 from South Carolina, and 1 from Georgia. Under this reorganization, the number of regiments in the Connecticut quota was unchanged.

The official establishment of a regiment was reduced to 582 officers and men. Each regiment was to consist of nine rather than eight companies. The ninth company was to be a company of light infantry, and was to be kept up to strength by drafting men from the regiment's eight other companies if necessary. During the campaigning season, the light infantry companies of the regiments in a field army were to be combined into a special corps of light infantry.

Because the Continental Congress passed this resolve at the beginning of the campaigning season, it was nearly a year before this reorganization was completed. The reorganization of the Continental Line was finalized on March 9, 1779.

On July 24, 1780, S.B. Webb's Additional Continental Regiment was officially redesignated the 9th Connecticut Regiment.

== Reorganization of the Connecticut Line, 1781 ==
In October 1780, the Continental Congress, in consultation with General Washington, passed resolutions providing for what would be the last reorganization of the Continental Army before its final disbandment.

On January 1, 1781, the Continental Line was to be reduced from 80 regiments to 50. The quota of regiments assigned to the states was 2 from New Hampshire, 10 from Massachusetts, 1 from Rhode Island, 5 from Connecticut, 2 from New York, 2 from New Jersey, 6 from Pennsylvania, 1 from Delaware, 5 from Maryland, 8 from Virginia, 4 from North Carolina, 2 from South Carolina, 1 from Georgia. In addition, one regiment (Colonel Moses Hazen's Canadian Regiment) was to be raised at large . Under this reorganization, the number of regiments in the Connecticut quota was reduced from eight to five.

The official establishment of an infantry regiment was increased to 717 officers and men. Each regiment continued to have nine companies, including a light infantry company, but the companies were made larger. For the first time, each regiment was to have a permanent recruiting party of 1 lieutenant, 1 drummer, and 1 fifer. Thus, there were to be five recruiting parties in Connecticut to systematically find and forward recruits to the Connecticut regiments in the field.

On January 1, 1781, the Connecticut Line was reorganized to consist of five regiments.

- The 1st Connecticut Regiment (1781) was constituted in the Connecticut Line by consolidation of the 3rd and 4th Connecticut Regiments of 1777. The regiment was commanded by Colonel John Durkee from 1 January 1781 until his death on 29 May 1782. He was succeeded by Lieutenant Colonel Thomas Grosvenor from the latter date until 1 January 1783.
- The 2d Connecticut Regiment (1781) was constituted in the Connecticut Line by consolidation of the 5th and 7th Connecticut Regiments of 1777. The regiment was commanded by Colonel Heman Swift from 1 January 1781 until June 1783.
- The 3d Connecticut Regiment (1781) was constituted in the Connecticut Line by consolidation of the 2d Connecticut Regiment of 1777 and the 9th Connecticut Regiment (formerly S.B. Webb's Additional Continental Regiment). The regiment was commanded by Colonel Samuel Blatchley Webb from 1 January 1781 until June 1783.
- The 4th Connecticut Regiment, under this reorganization, was a redesignation of the 6th Connecticut Regiment of 1777. In the reorganization of 1781, Colonel Zebulon Butler transferred from the old 2d Connecticut Regiment to take command of this regiment. Colonel Butler served as colonel until 1 January 1783.
- The 5th Connecticut Regiment (1781) was constituted in the Connecticut Line by consolidation of the 1st and 8th Connecticut Regiments of 1777. The regiment was commanded by Lieutenant Colonel Isaac Sherman from 1 January 1781 to 1 January 1783.

== Demobilization of the Connecticut Line ==
January 1, 1783.

- The 1st Connecticut Regiment.
- The 2d Connecticut Regiment.
- The 3d Connecticut Regiment.
- (The 4th Connecticut Regiment was disbanded on January 1, 1783).
- (The 5th Connecticut Regiment was disbanded on January 1, 1783).

June 15, 1783.

- The 1st Connecticut Regiment was redesignated the Connecticut Regiment.
- (The 2d Connecticut Regiment was furloughed).
- (The 3d Connecticut Regiment was furloughed).

November 15, 1783.

The three remaining regiments in the Connecticut Line were disbanded.
