= Gabriel Long =

- Born: February 23, 1751; Culpeper County, Colony of Virginia
- Died: February 3, 1827 (aged 75); Culpeper County, Virginia, United States
- Military career
- Allegiance: United States of America
- Branch: Continental Army; Light Infantry/Riflemen
- Service years: 1760–1763, 1774–1783, 1785–1795, 1811–1815
- Rank: Colonel
- Units: Virginia Militia; Culpeper Minutemen; Morgan's Virginia Rifle Company; Morgan's Rifle Corps; 11th Virginia Infantry; 7th Virginia Infantry; Kentucky Militia; U.S. Regular Infantry; Kentucky Volunteer Infantry

Gabriel Long (February 23, 1751 – February 3, 1827) was an American military officer and frontiersman who served with distinction in many early conflicts during the colonial and post-colonial eras, including the French and Indian War, the American Revolutionary War, and the War of 1812. He was known as an expert rifleman and an able commander who fought closely beside George Washington in several pivotal battles.

== Early life ==
Gabriel Long was born to Reuben Long and his wife Margaret Harrison in Culpeper County, in what was then the Colony of Virginia, in 1751. He was of strong Irish stock and of direct descent from the Longs of Wraxall. He came of age during the French and Indian War, in which his father and grandfather were both heavily involved, and during the conflict he tasted war for the first time as a color bearer and private soldier in the state militia. Long grew to be an excellent marksman and horseman and developed skills that would later prove useful during his career as a frontier soldier.

== Revolutionary War ==
Long was an ardent patriot, as were his father and grandfather. In 1774, a petition was sent to the Royal Governor of Virginia and the King of England himself by the men who would form the Culpeper Minutemen, a patriot militia based in Culpeper County. Gabriel Long had the distinction of being the very first to sign the document, using a bold noticeable signature much as John Hancock would do two years later on the Declaration of Independence. His father and grandfather also signed the petition and were members of the Culpeper Minutemen. As a member of the militia Long fought in Lord Dunmore's War in the summer and fall of 1774 and saw heavy action at the seaport Battles of Hampton and Norfolk and at the climactic Battle of Point Pleasant.

By the time Virginia began raising troops for service in the Continental Army, Long already had a rather distinguished service record and was renowned as one of the best riflemen in Virginia, so it was natural that when Daniel Morgan was recruiting his rifle battalion he chose Long as his senior captain. As later remarked by his men, Long was his "favourite captain and good friend". Long also began recruiting his own men. He would reportedly draw a target, usually in the shape of a human nose, in the middle of a board and set it up at several hundred yards; those who shot the closest to the nose would be chosen for service in his unit. Long himself was known to have shot apples off of men's heads at a considerable range, a practice which was said to have "wasted many apples". He was also known to be accurate up to 300 yards (270 m) with a target the size of an orange. His sons, Reuben and Solomon, also served in the Revolutionary War. Reuben served alongside his father in Daniel Morgan's unit, and Solomon served in Lieutenant Colonel Francis Marion's South Carolina Regiment.

Long traveled with Morgan to join George Washington's army in its siege of Boston and was heavily involved in operations in the Boston area. Long's fame and the fame of Morgan's Rifles began to grow by early 1776. He became good friends with Washington and the Marquis de Lafayette, and was often sent out on detached services as an independent commander. He became famous for his willingness to kill officers and his hatred of Tories as well as his fondness of scalping the officers he killed. Long went on to serve with distinction as the vanguard of the army and to protect its encampments.

During the Battle of Trenton, Long was the first across the Delaware River and his company led the assault. It is believed that he may have been the mysterious marksman who killed Colonel Johann Rall. At the Battle of Princeton in January 1777, Long helped unite Sullivan's and Washington's columns by holding back the British and thus greatly contributed to the American victory.

Long was Captain of one of eight elite Companies of detached Provisional Riflemen commanded by Colonel Daniel Morgan and sent by George Washington in August of 1777 to defend Albany from British army under General John Burgoyne, who surrendered to the American forces at the end of the Battles of Saratoga in October 1777. When Washington settled into camp at Valley Forge, Long led his men as a detached company under his independent command who scouted and skirmished all around the camp and prevented the British from taking Washington's army in such a vulnerable state. After the encampment at Valley Forge, he helped defend Philadelphia from an expected attack, and through his and others' efforts it was repulsed.

At Millstone, New Jersey, while leading a detachment, he came across a column of British soldiers under Lord Cornwallis whose intentions were to draw Washington's army out of its fortified position to an open area for a general engagement. Long, realizing this, raised the alarm and stood his ground, holding back the enemy while awaiting reinforcements which eventually completely drove out the British. Long once again saved Washington's army and would continue to do so in the future.
