= 10th Continental Regiment =

- Active: 1775–1776
- Allegiance: Continental Congress of the United States
- Branch: Continental Army
- Type: Infantry
- Size: Regiment
- Part of: Connecticut Line
- Engagements: American Revolutionary War: Battle of Long Island

Commanders
- Notable commanders: Samuel Holden Parsons

The 10th Continental Regiment was a unit of the Connecticut Line in the 1776 establishment of the Continental Army. It began as Parson's Connecticut Regiment (also known as the 6th Connecticut Provincial Regiment), which was part of the 1775 establishment, and was commanded by Colonel Samuel Holden Parsons until his promotion to brigadier general. It was first active during the Siege of Boston, and then in preparing the defenses of New York City. After Parsons was promoted in August 1776, command came to John Tyler, who was promoted to colonel at that time. The regiment fought in the Battle of Long Island, and was part of the panicked retreat after the British landing on Manhattan. Although the regiment was present with the army at White Plains, New York in October 1776, it did not participated in the battle fought there.

The regiment was then placed on guard duty at Peekskill, New York, where it remained until it was disbanded at the end of the year.
