= Elijah Miller House =

Historic house in New York, United States

- Miller House
- U.S. National Register of Historic Places
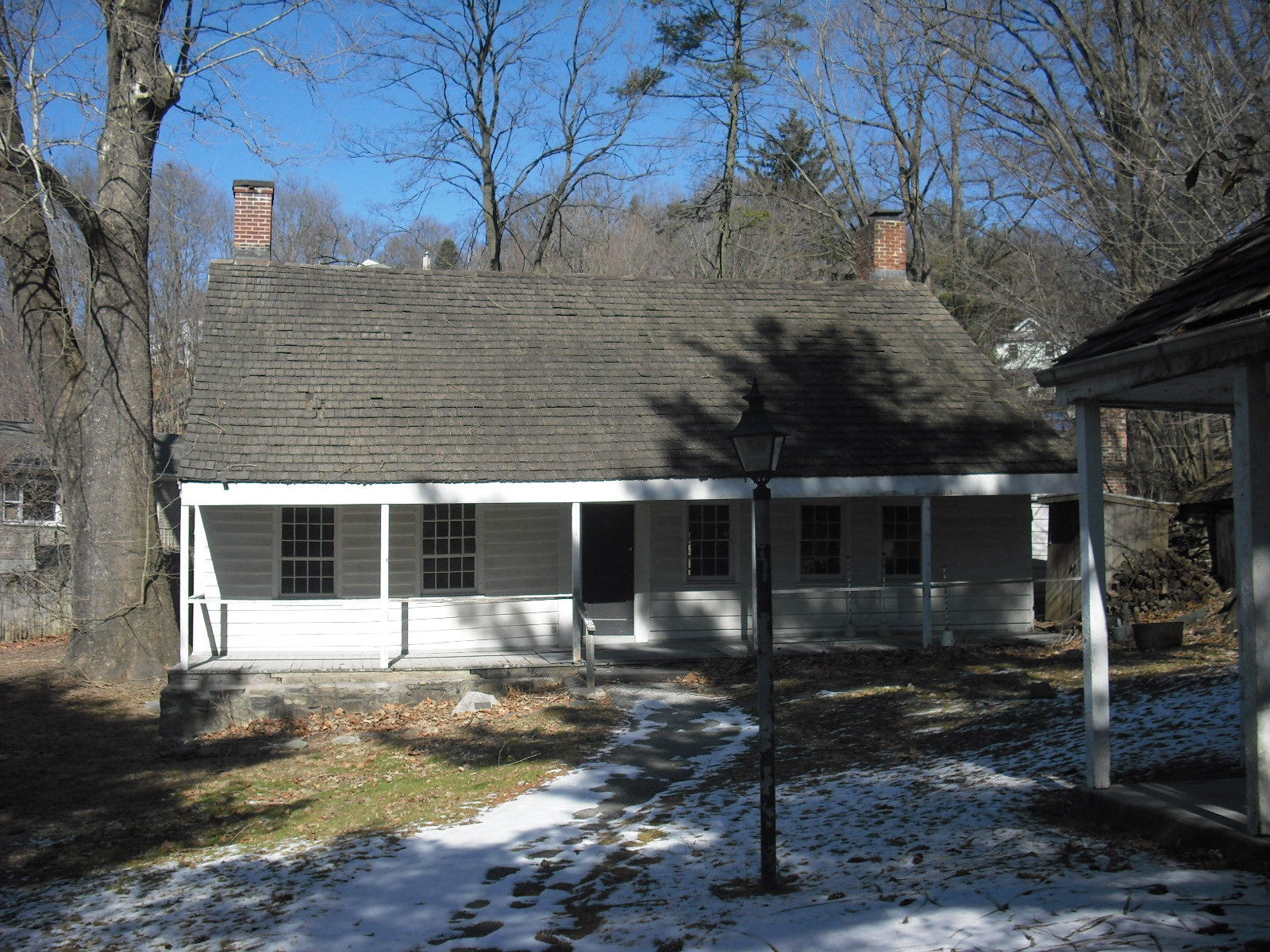

- Location within New York Location within the United States
- Location: Virginia Rd., North White Plains, New York
- Coordinates: 41°3′33″N 73°46′15″W
- Area: 1 acre (0.40 ha)
- Built: 1738
- Built by: John Miller
- NRHP reference No.: 76001292
- Added to NRHP: September 29, 1976

The Elijah Miller House is a historic home in North White Plains in Westchester County, New York. The house is an 18th-century Rhode Island-style farmhouse that was used during the Revolutionary War by General George Washington as a headquarters command post during the Battle of White Plains. The house, which is now a museum, was home to the average Colonial Westchester Ann and Elijah Miller family and contains many artifacts for public viewing.

== History ==
This Elijah Miller house originally sat on a 600-acre (2.4 km^{2}) farm and was probably built by John Miller in 1738. John had eight children, one of them being Elijah who was born in 1728. Elijah married a local named Anne Fisher and in 1770, they moved into the Miller house. Eventually, they put an addition on the west end of the house that included a parlor with a corner fireplace, a bedroom with a fireplace, a small porch and two more bedrooms on the second floor of the new addition. Elijah Miller joined the Westchester County Militia and died in August 1776 while in camp. Two of his sons, John and Elijah, were also in the Westchester County Militia, both dying of fever in camp during December 1776.

General George Washington occupied the house three times during the American Revolutionary War. The first was October 1776 as a command post during the Battle of White Plains, the second was the summer of 1778, and finally in 1781. Anne Miller, a widow, was General Washington's hostess during his stays. Anne would live to be 96 years old and eventually died in 1819. A Miller daughter, Sarah Miller Cornell, lived at the house until she died in 1838 at age 84. Other people would live at the house and farm the land, such as the last owner and former Armonk Postmaster, Charles Kaiser.

After Westchester County purchased the house in July 1917, it was renovated and opened to the public on October 29, 1918. The house is currently a museum under the Westchester County Department of Parks, Recreation and Conservation. Outside of the house is an enormous sycamore tree which undoubtedly was there at the time of General Washington's visit.

By the early 21st century the house was deteriorating from decades of neglect and was open to the public only on a very limited basis. In 2010 the county legislature passed a $1.2 million bond issue to finance its restoration. County executive Robert Astorino, who had supported preserving the building five years earlier as a member of the legislature, vetoed the measure, saying it should be supported by private funds. Due to the hard work of Friends of the Miller House/Washington's Headquarters and Daughters of Liberty's Legacy, Westchester County in May 2017 announced that up to $2 million of funds will be made available to renovate the house.

== See also ==
- National Register of Historic Places listings in northern Westchester County, New York
- List of Washington's Headquarters during the Revolutionary War
