= 19th Continental Regiment =

- Active: 1776
- Allegiance: Continental Congress of the United States
- Branch: Continental Army
- Type: Infantry
- Part of: Connecticut Line
- Engagements: Battle of White Plains; Battle of Trenton; Battle of the Assunpink Creek; Battle of Princeton

Commanders
- Notable commanders: Charles Webb

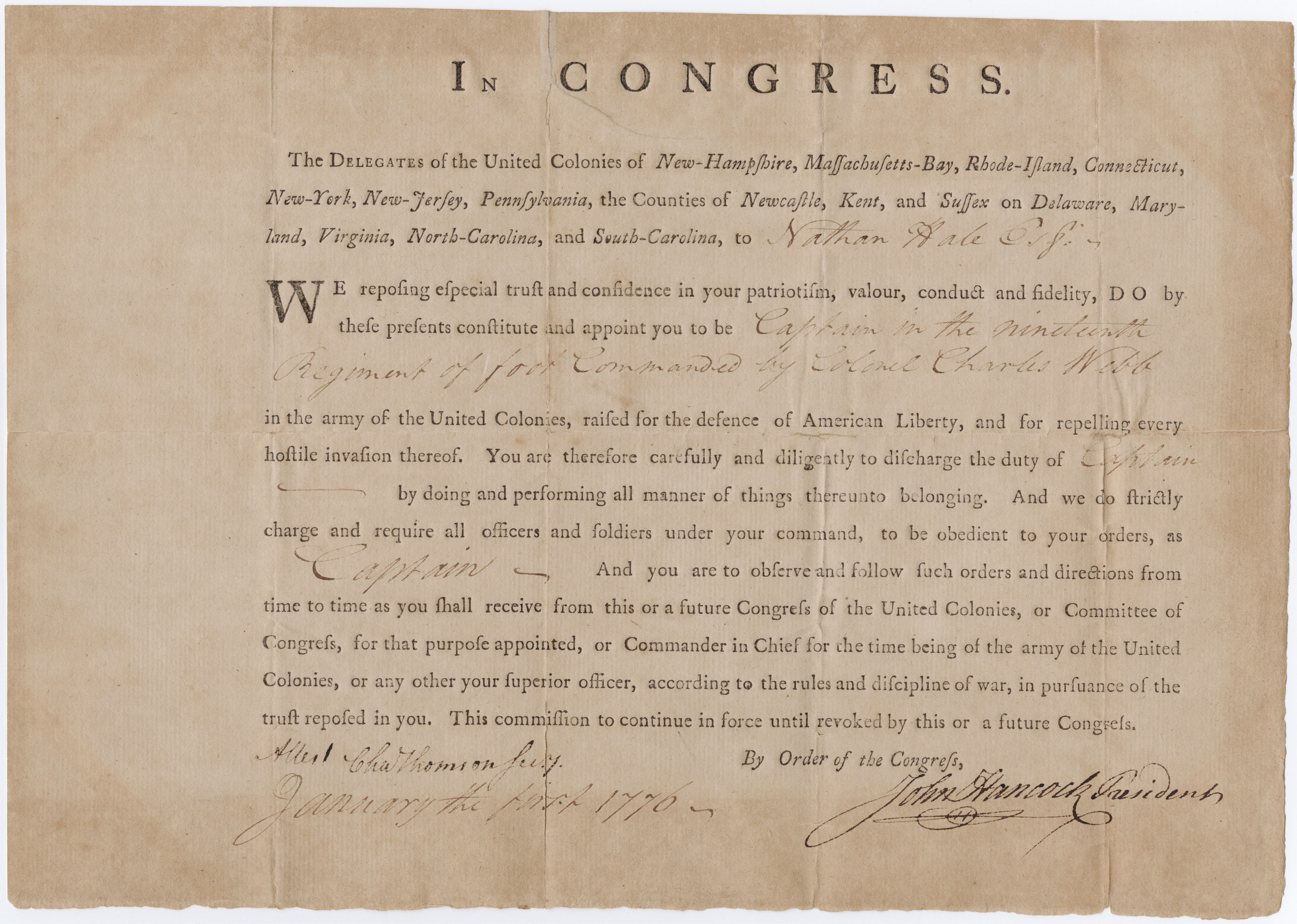
1776 document commissioning Nathan Hale as a captain in the 19th Continental Regiment.

The 19th Continental Regiment, also called the 19th Regiment of Foot, was a unit of the Connecticut Line in the 1776 establishment of the Continental Army. It is a successor to Webb's Connecticut Regiment (also known as the 7th Connecticut Provincial Regiment), which was part of the 1775 establishment, and it continued to be commanded by Col. Charles Webb. Active during the New York and New Jersey campaign, it was on the lines but did not fight at the Battle of Long Island. It saw action at the Battle of White Plains and retreated with George Washington's army to Pennsylvania in late 1776. It then participated in the Battle of Trenton. Some of its men chose to overstay their enlistment and also saw action in the Battle of the Assunpink Creek and the Battle of Princeton in early 1777.

With the reorganization of the Continental Army at the end of 1776, the regiment became the 2nd Connecticut Regiment.
