= Commission (document) =

Document appointing an individual as an officer

A commission is a formal document issued to appoint a named person to high office or as a commissioned officer in a territory's armed forces. A commission constitutes documentary authority that the person named is vested with the powers of that office and is empowered to execute official acts. A commission often takes the form of letters patent.

Commissions are typically issued in the name of or signed by the head of state. In Commonwealth realms, the documentation is referred to as a King's Commission or Queen's Commission (depending on the gender of the reigning monarch). However, in Commonwealth realms other than the United Kingdom, they may be signed by the governor-general, the representative of the monarch of that realm.

== Terminology ==
Because the word "commission" can also refer generally to an individual's duty, the more specific terms commissioning parchment or commissioning scroll are often used to specify the commissioning document. However, the document is not usually in the form of a scroll and is more often printed on paper instead of parchment. In Canada, there is a differentiation in terminology according to rank; officers are accorded commissioning scripts.

== Military and naval examples ==
=== Canada ===
Here is an example from Canada:

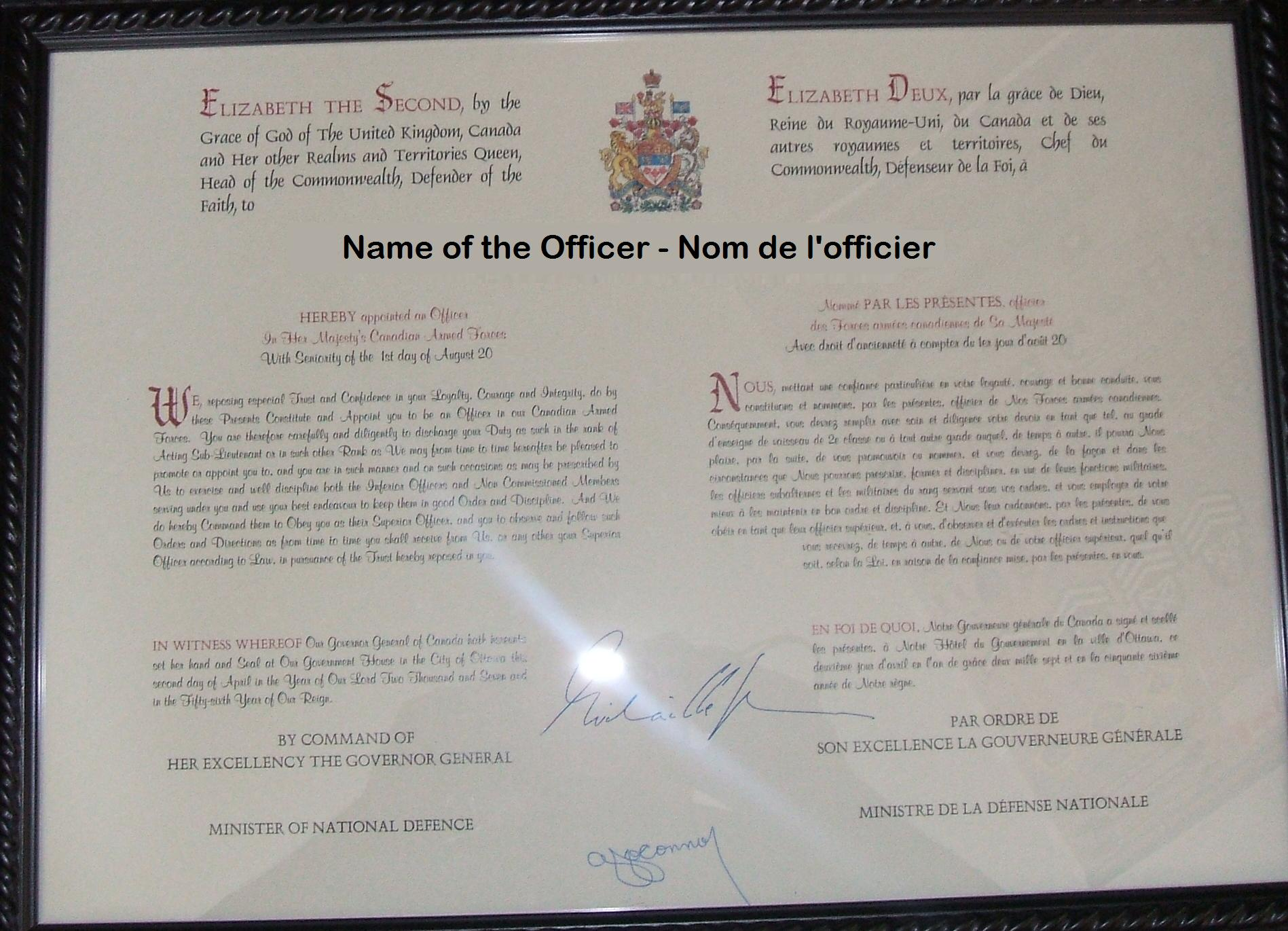
Canadian commission from 2007 of a naval (acting sub-lieutenant) male (indicated in French) officer

CHARLES THE THIRD, by the Grace of God, King of Canada and His other Realms and Territories, Head of the Commonwealth

To ........ .........

hereby appointed an Officer in His Majesty's Canadian Armed Forces

With Seniority of the .... day of ......... ....

WE reposing especial Trust and Confidence in your Loyalty, Courage and Integrity do by these Presents Constitute and Appoint you to be an Officer in our Canadian Armed Forces. You are therefore carefully and diligently to discharge your Duty as such in the Rank of .............. or in such other Rank as We may from time to time hereafter be pleased to promote or appoint you to, and you are in such manner and on such occasions as may be prescribed by us to exercise and well discipline both the Inferior Officers and Non-Commissioned Members serving under you and use your best endeavour to keep them in good Order and Discipline, and We do hereby Command them to Obey you as their Superior Officer, and you to observe and follow such Orders and Directions as from time to time you shall receive from Us, or any other your Superior Officer according to Law, in pursuance of the Trust hereby Reposed in you.

IN WITNESS Whereof our Governor General of Canada hath hereunto set her hand and Seal at Our Government House in the City of Ottawa this .... day of .......... in the Year of our Lord ................... and in the .... Year of Our Reign.

By Command of Her Excellency the Governor General

Canadian Commissioning Scripts, as they are properly called by NDHQ, are signed by the Governor General of Canada and countersigned by the Minister of National Defence, on behalf of the King of Canada.

Here is an example of the Royal Canadian Navy's Commission from pre-1968:

ELIZABETH THE SECOND, by the Grace of God of the United Kingdom, Canada and Her other Realms and Territories, Queen, Head of the Commonwealth, Defender of the Faith.

To Mr ............ hereby appointed Sub Lieutenant in Her Majesty's Canadian Fleet.

WE reposing special Trust and Confidence in your Loyalty, Courage and Integrity, do by these Presents Constitute and Appoint you a Sub Lieutenant, Royal Canadian Navy, Willing and Requiring you from time to time to repair on board and to take upon you the Charge and Command of Sub Lieutenant in any ship or Establishment to which you may hereafter at any time be duly appointed, or the charge and Command of any other Rank to which you may be promoted or appointed, strictly Charging and Commanding all the Officers and company of the said Ship or Establishment subordinate to you to conduct themselves jointly and severally in their respective employments with all due Respect and Obedience unto you, and you likewise to observe and execute the Queen's Regulations and Orders for the Royal Canadian Navy and such Orders and Instructions as you shall from time to time receive from Naval Headquarters or from your Superior Officers. Hereof nor you nor any of you may fail as you will answer the contrary at your Peril. And for so doing so this shall be Your Commission.

=== Sweden ===
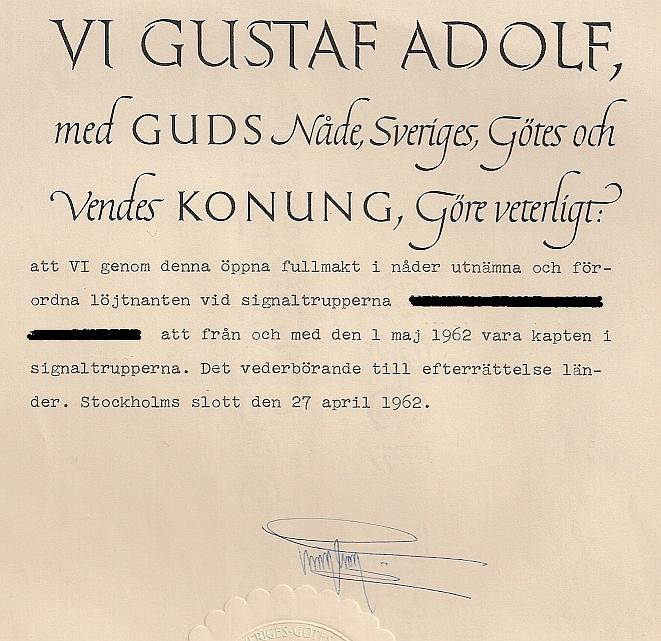
An example of a Swedish commission from 1962, signed by King Gustav VI Adolf

Officers in the Swedish Armed Forces have not received written commissions since 1982 when a new employment structure was instituted by law. They are nowadays hired on contracts, as in any other civil service position. Prior to 1982 all officers received written certificates of commission, each signed by the King of Sweden.

The wording used prior to 1982 in translation would be;

We N.N. By the Grace of God, King of the Swedes, the Goths and the Wends, make known: that We by this open commission have by grace commissioned and appointed the [present rank] in the [name of service or regiment] [recipients name] that from [day] of [month] [year] be [new rank] in the [name of service or regiment]. This for the observance of all. Stockholm Palace on the [day] of [month] [year].

=== United Kingdom ===
The following is typical of the wording of a British commission during the reign of Charles III,

CHARLES THE THIRD, by the Grace of God
of the United Kingdom of Great Britain and Northern Ireland, and of His other Realms and Territories King, Head of the Commonwealth, Defender of the Faith.

To our Trusty and Well Beloved ........................ Greeting:

We, reposing especial Trust and Confidence in your Loyalty, Courage, and good Conduct, do by these Presents Constitute and Appoint you to be an Officer in Our ......................... from the .... day of ........ ...... You are therefore carefully and diligently to discharge your Duty as such in the Rank of .................... or in such other Rank as We may from time to time hereafter be pleased to promote you to, of which a notification will be made in the London Gazette, and you are in such manner on such occasions as may be prescribed by Us to exercise and well discipline in their duties such officers, men and women as may be placed under your orders from time to time and use your best endeavours to keep them in good order and discipline.

And We do hereby Command them to Obey you as their superior Officer and you to observe and follow such Orders and Directions as from time to time you shall receive from Us, or any superior Officer, according to the Rules and Discipline of War, in pursuance of the Trust hereby reposed in you.

Given at Our Court, at Saint James's the .... day of ........ .... in the ..... Year of Our Reign

BY HIS MAJESTYS COMMAND

The commission would be signed by the King at the top left of the scroll (although a facsimile signature may be used) and countersigned at the bottom of the scroll by two senior members of the Ministry of Defence.

==== Royal Navy pre-1964 ====
Before the Board of Admiralty were merged into the Ministry of Defence in 1964, with the title of Lord High Admiral reverting to the Crown, the naval officer's commission was signed not by the Sovereign but by the Lords Commissioners of the Admiralty, executing the office of Lord High Admiral. The naval officer's commission was worded as follows:

By the Commissioners for Executing the Office of Lord High Admiral of the United Kingdom.

To ......... ..........

hereby appointed a ............... in Her Majesty's Fleet.

By Virtue of the Power of Authority to us given by Her Majesty's Letters Patent under the Great Seal, We do hereby constitute and appoint you a .......... in Her Majesty's Fleet. Charging and Commanding you in that rank or in any higher rank to which you may be promoted to observe and execute the Queen's Regulations and Admiralty Instructions for the Government of Her Majesty's Naval Service and all such Orders and Instructions as you shall from time to time receive from Us or from your Superior Officers for Her Majesty's Service. And likewise Charging and Commanding all Officers and Men subordinate to you according to the said Regulations Instructions or Orders to behave themselves with all due Respect and Obedience to you their Superior Officer. Given under our hands and the Seal of the Office of Admiralty this .... day of ......... .... in the .... Year of Her Majesty's Reign.

By Command

With Seniority of ..............

Similarly the following is the wording of a Lieutenant's Commission from 1800:

By the Commissioners for executing the Office of the Lord High Admiral of Great Britain and Ireland &c and of all His Majesty's Plantations &c.

To Lieut. ..... hereby appointed Lieutenant of His Majesty's Ship the.......

By Virtue of the Power and Authority to us given We do hereby constitute and appoint you Lieutenant of His Majesty's Ship the ..... willing and requiring you forthwith to go on board and take upon you the Charge and Command of Lieutenant in her accordingly. Strictly Charging and Commanding all the Officers and Company belonging to the said ship subordinate to you to behave themselves jointly and severally in their respective Employments with all the Respect and Obedience unto you their said Lieutenant; And you likewise to observe and execute as well the General printed Instructions as what Orders and Directions you shall from time to time receive from your Captain or any other your superior Officers for His Majesty's service. Hereof nor you nor any of you may fail as you will answer the contrary at your peril. And for so doing this shall be your Warrant. Given under our hands and the Seal of the Office Admiralty this ..... day of ....., ..... in the ..... Year of His Majesty's Reign.

By Command of their Lordships

Seniority ..............

It was signed by two Lords Commissioners of the Admiralty and a Secretary, i.e. a quorum of the Board of Admiralty.

=== United States ===
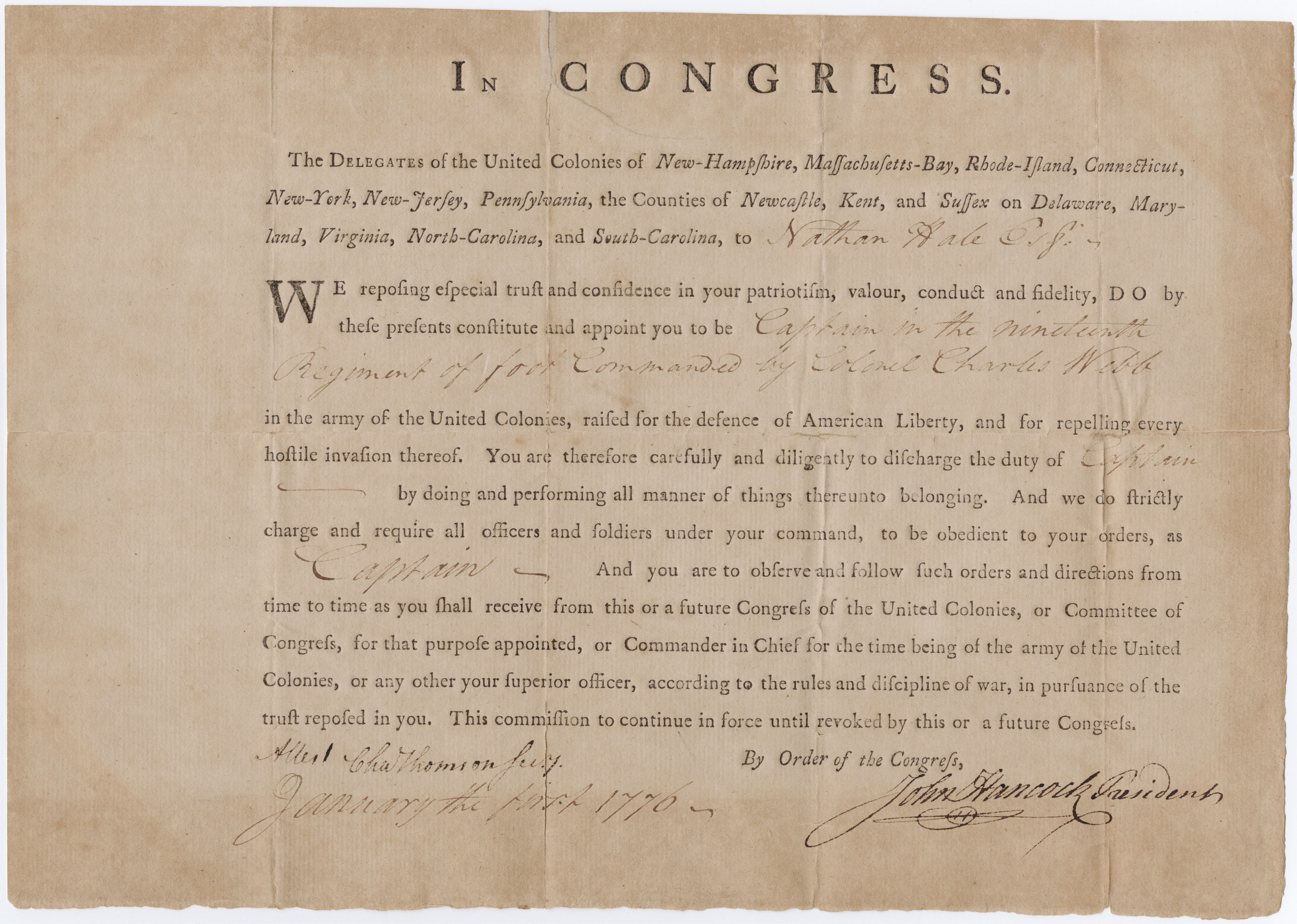
1776 document commissioning Nathan Hale as a captain in the 19th Continental Regiment.

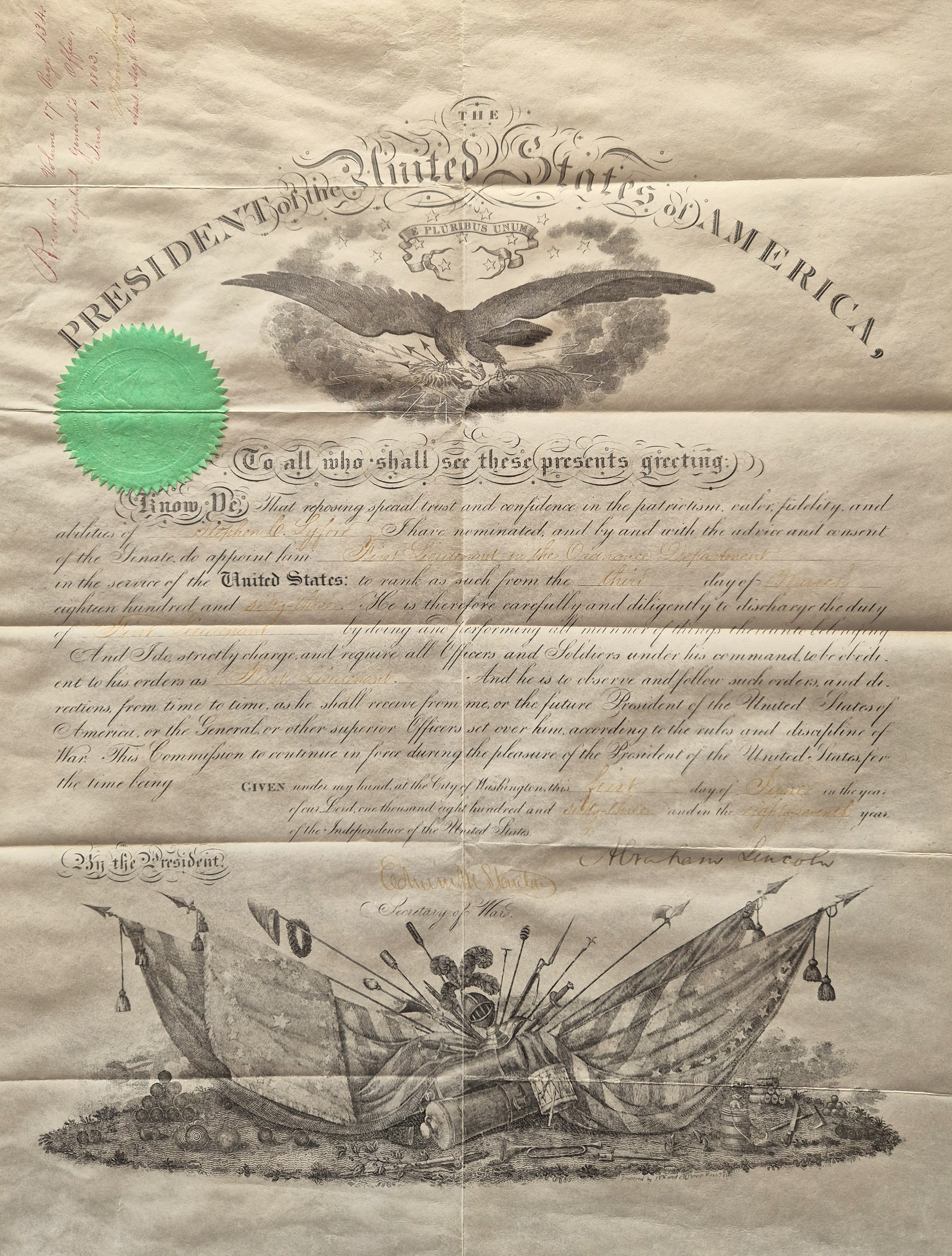
"Military Appointment" of President Abraham Lincoln, issued at the first day of June 1863

Article II, section 3, of the U.S. Constitution provides that the President "shall Commission all the Officers of the United States," including officers of the uniformed services as well as civilian officers. Commissions of officers in the armed services are issued in the name of the President, although authority to sign on the President's behalf is generally exercised by the secretary of the department in which the officer is being commissioned. This includes not only "commissioned officers" but also "commissioned warrant officers" (warrant officers in the pay grades of W-2 through W-5). Warrant officers at the grade of W-1 are appointed by warrant by the secretary of their respective service, except in the Coast Guard where they are appointed by secretarial commission.

The commission of a newly commissioned officer reads:

The President of the United States of America

To all who shall see these presents, greeting:

Know Ye that, reposing special trust and confidence in the patriotism, valor, fidelity and abilities of .................., I do appoint ["him" or "her"] a ["Second Lieutenant" or "Ensign"] in the [name of service] to rank as such from the .... day of ........ ...... This Officer will therefore carefully and diligently discharge the duties of the office to which appointed by doing and performing all manner of things thereunto belonging.

And I do strictly charge and require those Officers and other personnel of lesser rank to render such obedience as is due an officer of this grade and position. And this Officer is to observe and follow such orders and directives, from time to time, as may be given by me, or the future President of the United States of America, or other Superior Officers acting in accordance with the laws of the United States of America.

This commission is to continue in force during the pleasure of the President of the United States of America for the time being, under the provisions of those Public Laws relating to Officers of the Armed Forces of the United States of America and the component thereof in which this appointment is made.

Done at the City of Washington, this .... day of ........ in the year of our Lord ................ and of the Independence of the United States of America the ..........

By the President:

At higher grade levels (Major or Lieutenant Commander and above in the Regular components and Colonel or Captain and above in the Reserve components), appointments and promotions require Senate confirmation, and the wording of the commission reflects that fact: "... I have nominated and, by and with the Advice and Consent of the Senate, do appoint..."

== Examples of commissions to civil offices ==
=== United States ===
The Constitutional requirement mentioned above, that the President commission all officers of the United States, includes a wide range of civilian officials, including justices of the Supreme Court and other federal judges, the heads of executive departments, subcabinet level officials down to the level of assistant secretary, U.S. attorneys and marshals, diplomatic representatives, and members of the US Foreign Service, among others. Commissions are issued in the name of the President, either under his own signature or that of an official delegated to act on his behalf, and under either the Great Seal of the United States or the seal of the executive department in which the appointment is made.

A typical commission for a Presidentially-appointed, Senate-confirmed civilian official in the Executive Branch would read:

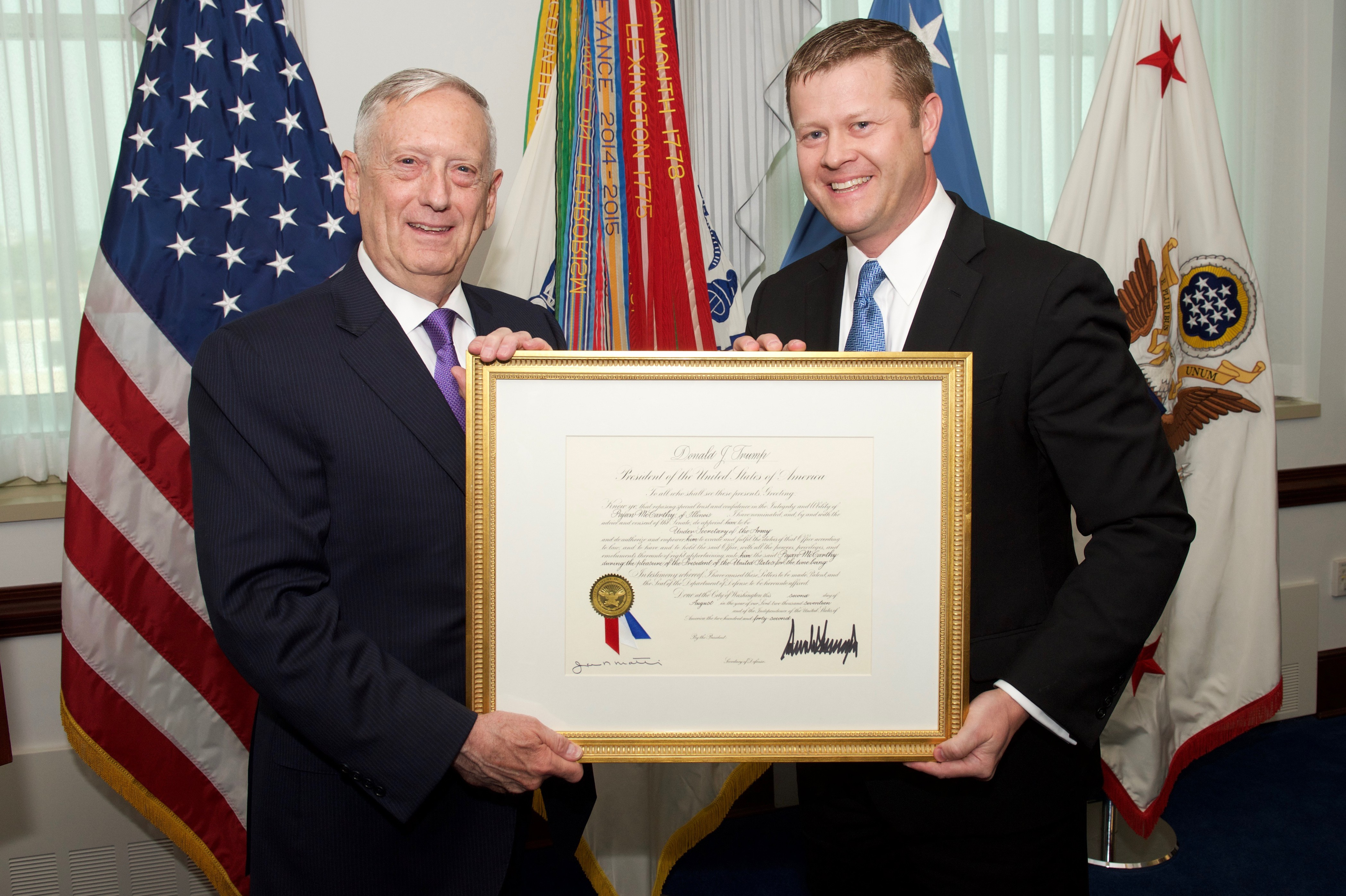
Former Secretary of Defense Jim Mattis and Ryan D. McCarthy in 2017, holding the latter's framed commission scroll as Under Secretary of the Army, affixed with the seal of the U.S. Department of Defense and signed by both Mattis and President Donald Trump.

[Name of the President]
President of the United States of America

To all who shall see these presents, Greeting:

Know ye, that reposing special trust and confidence in the Integrity and Ability of [name of appointee] of [home state], I have nominated, and, by and with the advice and consent of the Senate, do appoint [him/her] to be
[name of office]
and do authorize and empower [him/her] to execute and fulfil the duties of that Office according to law, and to have and to hold the said Office, with all the powers, privileges, and emoluments thereunto of right appertaining, unto [him/her] the said [name of appointee] during the pleasure of the President of the United States for the time being.

In testimony whereof, I have caused these Letters to be made Patent, and the Seal of the [executive department concerned] to be hereunto affixed.

Done at the City of Washington this [day] day of [month] in the Year of our Lord [year] and of the Independence of the United States of America the [age of America].

By the President: [President's signature]

[Seal of the executive department concerned]
[Signature of the head of the department] [name of their office]

For heads of executive departments and independent agencies, the Seal of the United States and the signature of the Secretary of State appear. If the position is subordinate to the head of an executive department, the seal of the relevant executive department appears instead of the Seal of the United States, and the signature of the head of that department replaces that of the Secretary of State.

For certain positions, other characteristics such as "prudence" (for ambassadors) or "wisdom, uprightness, and learning" (for judges) may be used in addition to or instead of "integrity and ability". If a position is for a fixed term of years or "during good behavior", the appropriate wording replaces the clause beginning "during the pleasure of the President."

Commissions of officers in the U.S. Foreign Service are also signed by the President. The commission of a newly commissioned officer reads:

The President of the United States of America

To (name of officer) Greeting

Reposing special trust and confidence in your Integrity, Prudence and Ability, I have nominated and, by and with the advice and consent of the Senate, do appoint you a Foreign Service Officer, a Consular Officer, and a Secretary in the Diplomatic Service of the United States of America, and do authorize and empower you to do and perform all such matters and things as to the said offices do appertain, and to have and to hold the said offices, and to exercise and enjoy all the rights, privileges and immunities thereunto appertaining, during the pleasure of the President of the United States.

In testimony whereof, I have caused the Seal of the United States to be hereunto affixed.

Done at the City of Washington this .... day of .... in the year of our Lord .... and of the Independence of the United States of America the ....

By the President (President's signature)

The commission is countersigned by the Secretary of State, and the singular Great Seal of the United States (entrusted to the Secretary under the 1789 statute creating the Department of State) is affixed.

=== US States ===
Similar to the U.S. Constitution's provisions directing the President to commission executive officers of the U.S. Government, the states' constitutions and/or laws provide for state (and sometimes local) officers to be commissioned; for example, Texas law directs the Texas governor to commission most state officers and elected county officers.

A person applying for a license to be a notary public receives a commission, generally indicating what political jurisdiction (state or District of Columbia) issued it, the period of its validity (usually four years from issue), and the signature of the issuing authorities (usually the Governor and countersigned by the Secretary of State).

== See also ==
- Dormant commission
- Roving commission
- Purchase of commissions in the British Army
