= John Durkee =

American military officer

- Born: December 11, 1728
- Died: May 29, 1782 aged 54)
- Spouse: Martha Wood Durkee
- Military career
- Allegiance: 1775-1776 (United Colonies) 1776-1781 (United States)
- Branch: Continental Army
- Service years: 1775-1781
- Rank: Colonel
- Nickname: "The Bold Man from Bean Hill" "The Bold Bean Hiller"
- Conflicts: American Revolutionary War; Battle of Bunker Hill; Battle of Monmouth

John Durkee (December 11, 1728 - May 29, 1782) of Connecticut was a commissioned officer in the Continental Army during the American Revolution and the French and Indian War. He was born in Windham, Connecticut before relocating to Norwich, Connecticut around the age of 18. Records are sparse on his life, but documentation of his military service indicates that in May 1775 he was a major in Brigadier General Israel Putnam's 3rd Connecticut State Regiment. With the start of the war, Durkee was promoted to lieutenant colonel on July 1, 1775. He was made lieutenant colonel of the 20th Continental Regiment on January 1, 1776, and then its colonel in August 1776. Durkee was transferred as colonel to the 4th Connecticut Regiment in January 1777. He was wounded at the Battle of Monmouth on June 28, 1778, and was transferred again to the 1st Connecticut Regiment on January 1, 1781. He died on May 29, 1782.
