= 1st Connecticut Regiment =

- Active: 1776–1781
- Allegiance: Continental Congress of the United States
- Type: Infantry
- Size: 728 soldiers
- Part of: Connecticut Line
- Colors: Red coat, faced white, until 1779
- Engagements: Monmouth

Commanders
- Notable commanders: Colonel Jediah Huntington; Colonel Josiah Starr; Colonel Sherman and Colonel Swift

The 1st Connecticut Regiment was a unit of the Continental Army, and was involved in the American Revolutionary War. The regiment was initially formed in 1776, and was active in various forms until 1783.

== 1776–1780 ==
The 1st Connecticut Regiment was authorized on 16 September 1776 in the Continental Army. The regiment was organized between 1 January 1777 at Norwich, Connecticut, with eight companies from the counties of New London, Windham, and Hartford of the state of Connecticut. It was assigned to the 2nd Connecticut Brigade of the Highlands Department on 3 April 1777. On 12 June 1777 it was reassigned from the 2nd Connecticut Brigade to the 1st Connecticut Brigade. Three days later, 15 June 1777 this brigade was reassigned to the main Continental Army. On 17 July 1777 the brigade was reassigned to the Highlands Department. The Regiment was reassigned to the 2nd Connecticut Brigade on 12 September 1777 and two days later 14 September 1777 the brigade was reassigned to the main Continental Army. On 2 May 1779 the brigade was reassigned to the Highlands Department and the regiment was reorganized to nine companies on 11 July 1779. On 16 November 1779 the 2nd Connecticut Brigade was reassigned to the main Continental Army. One year later, 27 November 1780 the brigade was reassigned to the Highland Department. On 1 January 1781 the regiment was consolidated with the 8th Connecticut Regiment and was re-designated the 5th Connecticut Regiment. The regiment would see action in the New York Campaign and the Battle of Monmouth.

== 1781–1783 ==
A new 1st Connecticut Regiment was formed from the merger of the old 3rd Connecticut Regiment with the old 4th Connecticut Regiment, on 1 January 1781. On 1 January 1783 it was reassigned from the 1st Connecticut Brigade to the Connecticut Brigade in the Highland's Department. The regiment was re-designated the Connecticut Brigade on 15 June 1783 and reassigned to the Main Continental Army. The regiment was disbanded at West Point, New York on 15 November 1783.

== See also ==
- 1st Connecticut Regiment (1775)
