= 4th Connecticut Regiment =

- Active: 1775-1783
- Allegiance: Continental Congress of the United States
- Type: Infantry
- Part of: Connecticut Line
- Engagements: Battle of Brandywine, Battle of Germantown; Battle of Monmouth.

Commanders
- Notable commanders: Colonel Benjamin Hinman, Colonel John Durkee

The 4th Connecticut Regiment was raised on April 27, 1775, at Hartford, Connecticut. The regiment saw action in the Invasion of Canada following its adoption into the Continental Army on June 14, 1775, during which it was led by Colonel Benjamin Hinman. After which the regiment was disbanded on December 20, 1775, and reformed on September 16, 1776, to fight in the Philadelphia campaign in the Battle of Brandywine, Battle of Germantown and the Battle of Monmouth. These battles saw the leadership of Colonel John Durkee. The regiment was merged along with the 3rd Connecticut Regiment into the 1st Connecticut Regiment on January 1, 1783, at West Point, New York.

== See also ==
- 4th Connecticut Infantry Regiment - Civil War unit with this designation
