= Johann Rall =

Commander of Hessian troops

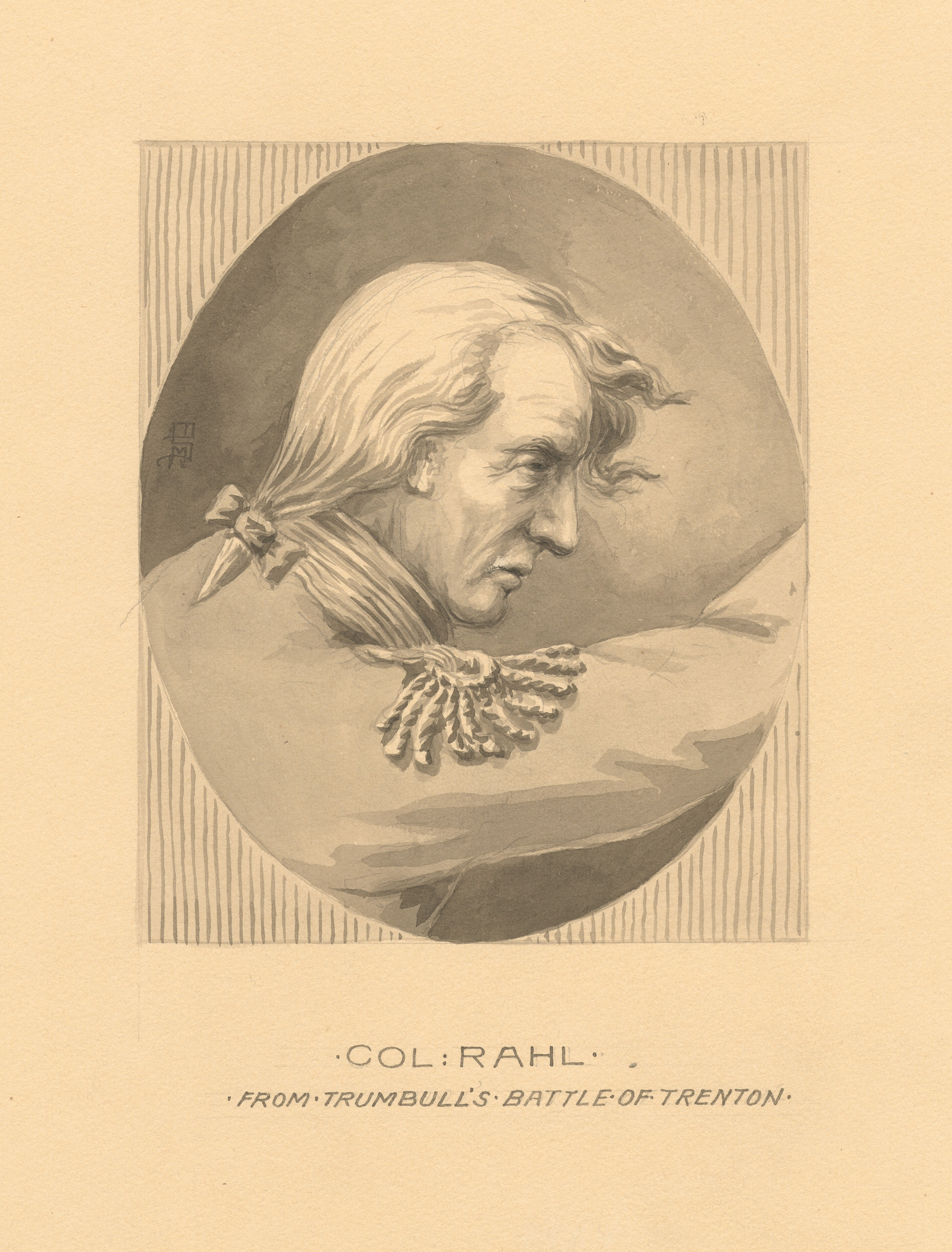
- 18th century sketch of Rall
- Born: c. 1726; Hesse-Cassel, Holy Roman Empire
- Died: December 27, 1776 (aged 50) Trenton, New Jersey, United States
- Allegiance: Hesse-Cassel
- Branch: Hessian Mercenaries
- Service years: 1740–1776
- Rank: Colonel
- Conflicts: War of Austrian Succession; Jacobite rising of 1745; Seven Years' War; Fourth Russo-Turkish War; American Revolutionary War; Battle of Long Island; Battle of White Plains; Battle of Fort Washington; Battle of Trenton †

Johann Gottlieb Rall (also spelled Rahl) (c. 1726 – December 27, 1776) was a German colonel best known for his command of Hessian troops at the Battle of Trenton during the American Revolutionary War.

== Early life and education ==
Rall was born as a so-called "soldier child" in about 1726. He was a son of Captain Joachim Rall from Stralsund, who served in the regiment of Major General August Moritz von Donop. The first mention of Johann Rall was as a new cadet of the same regiment on March 1, 1740, commanded at this time by Colonel Prince Casimir von Isenburg of Isenburg-Birstein.

== Career ==
In the service of the Landgraf of Hesse-Cassel, he was promoted to ensign on July 25, 1741; to lieutenant on August 28, 1745; and to captain on May 10, 1753. Rall was promoted to major on May 7, 1760, under Major General Bischhausen and transferred in January 1763 to the Stein garrison regiment, where he was appointed lieutenant colonel. On April 22, 1771, he was transferred to the Mansbach Infantry Regiment as a colonel. He became commander of the regiment in January 1772.

During this time, Rall fought in the War of the Austrian Succession and participated in campaigns in Bavaria, on the Rhine, and in the Netherlands. He also saw the beginning of his service as a mercenary commander by fighting in Scotland to help suppress the Jacobite rising of 1745. The British then hired him to serve alongside their forces in the Seven Years' War (the campaign in North America is known as the French and Indian War), where he fought in many battles. From September 1771 until August 1772, he transferred to Russia and fought for Catherine the Great under Count Orlov in the Fourth Russo-Turkish War.

=== American Revolutionary War ===
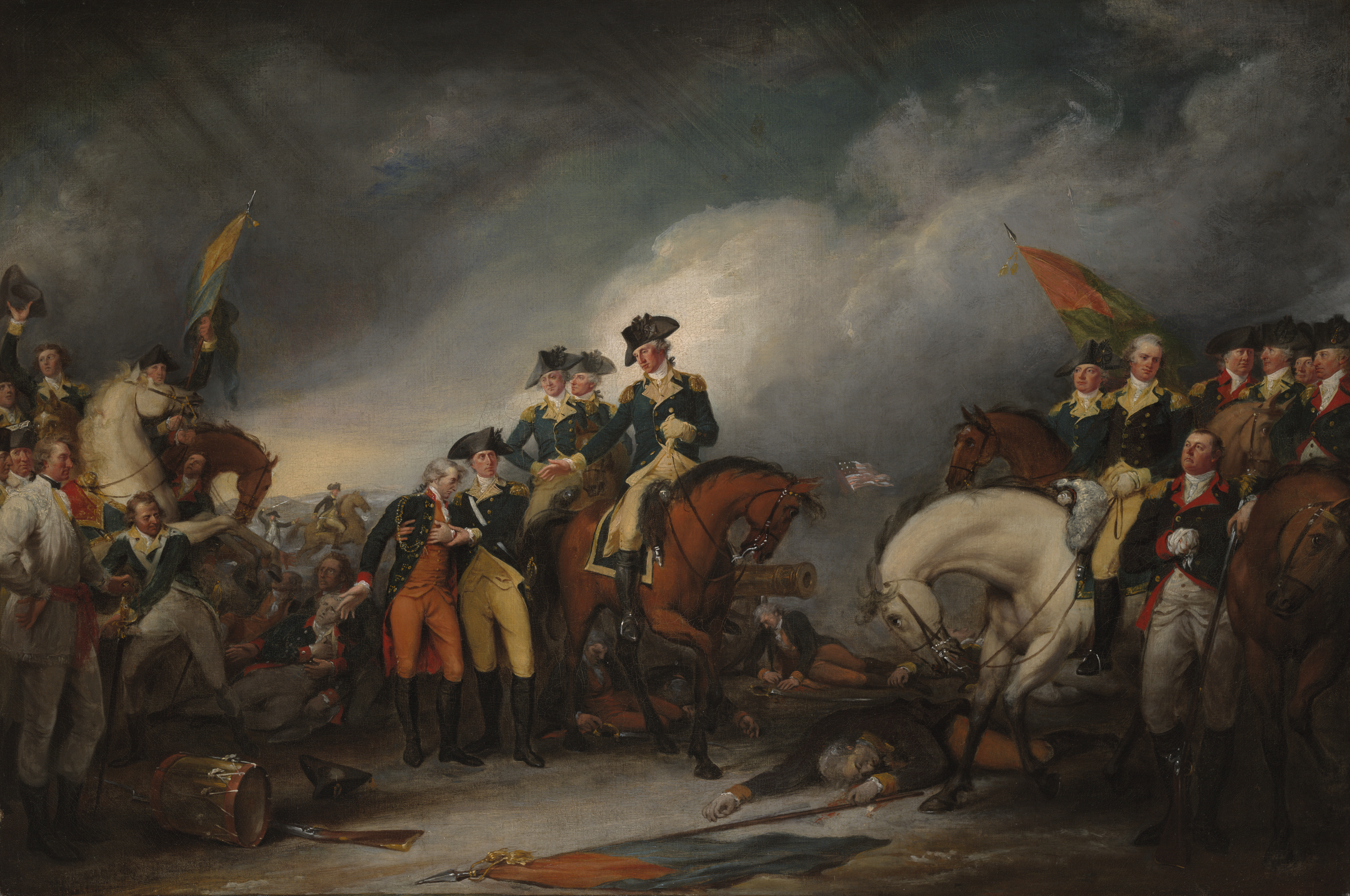
The Capture of the Hessians at Trenton, December 26, 1776 by John Trumbull, showing George Washington and Johann Rall

By 1776, Rall had joined the staff of the 1st Division under General Leopold Philip de Heister and commanded a Hessian Brigade of approximately 1,200 men fighting for Great Britain in the American War of Independence. He was at the battles of Long Island, White Plains, and Fort Washington, and figured prominently in the Battle of Trenton.

On the night of December 25–26, 1776 General George Washington crossed the Delaware River with his troops on the way to Trenton, New Jersey. The Hessian regiments, camped in and around Trenton commanded by Rall, were attacked and soundly defeated by the American Continental Army. Ironically, Rall had earlier turned away one of the Doan Outlaws, who were Quaker Tories, who had learned of the planned American attack, reportedly because he was in the middle of a card game and did not believe the Americans would dare try to ambush his men. The spy settled for passing on a note, but Rall ignored it. The note informing the colonel of the attack was later found in his coat pocket.

While leading his troops during the battle, Rall was mortally wounded. He was shot twice in the side and needed to be carried back to his headquarters set up in the house of Stacy Potts (a distinguished member of the Trenton community) where he died that night. Before his death, he requested a formal surrender to Washington.

According to local tradition, Rall is buried in an unidentified grave in the churchyard of the First Presbyterian Church on East State Street in Trenton, where an inscription is dedicated to his memory.

== See also ==
- Cathedral of St. Mary of the Assumption – Site of his headquarters in Trenton, New Jersey
