= 20th Continental Regiment =

American military unit

- Active: 1776
- Allegiance: Continental Congress of the United States
- Type: Infantry
- Part of: Connecticut Line
- Engagements: Battle of Trenton; Battle of the Assunpink Creek; Battle of Princeton

Commanders
- Notable commanders: Colonel Benedict Arnold

The 20th Continental Regiment was a unit of the Connecticut Line in the 1776 establishment of the Continental Army. It was often referred to in records as Durkee's Regiment, after Colonel John Durkee, its commanding officer for most of its existence, or incorrectly as the 20th Connecticut Regiment. The regiment was posted in New Jersey during the early stages of the New York and New Jersey campaign. The regiment retreated with George Washington's army in late 1776, and then participated in the Battle of Trenton. Some of its men chose to overstay their enlistment and also saw action in the Battle of the Assunpink Creek and the Battle of Princeton in early 1777.

The first colonel of the regiment was Benedict Arnold, but he never actually commanded the regiment, as he was in Quebec at the time of its creation, and he was soon thereafter promoted to brigadier general. John Durkee was its first lieutenant colonel, and was promoted and made the regiment's colonel in August 1776.
