= List of Continental Army units (1775) =

The Continental Army was the army raised by the Second Continental Congress to oppose the British Army during the American Revolutionary War. The army went through three major establishments: the first in 1775, the second in 1776, and the third from 1777 until after the end of the war.

== Creation of the army ==
The Continental Army was established by the Continental Congress on June 14, 1775, which is also recognized as the founding date of its successor, the United States Army. On that day, the Continental Congress assumed responsibility for militia regiments that had been raised by the colonies of New Hampshire, Massachusetts, Rhode Island, and Connecticut. Most of these troops were stationed outside Boston, Massachusetts, where they besieged the city occupied by British troops under the command of General Thomas Gage. The forces adopted by the Continental Congress amounted to 39 regiments of infantry, and 1 regiment and 1 separate company of artillery. The period of service for many of these regiments ended on December 31, 1775, although some had a service period that expired earlier. The Continental Congress resolved on June 15, 1775, that the Continental Army should be commanded by a full general. This appointment was offered to George Washington, who accepted it the following day. In company with Philip Schuyler and other officers he began the journey from Philadelphia to Boston.

On June 14 Continental Congress also for the first time ordered additional troops to be raised for national defense. It ordered that ten companies of "expert riflemen" be raised in Pennsylvania, Maryland, and Virginia, specifying their organization, pay, and term of enlistment.

As 1775 came to a close, with no end in sight to the siege of Boston and troops in Quebec preparing to attack Quebec City, Congress authorized a second establishment of the army, with a new regimental structure.

Unless otherwise noted, the regiments and companies listed were adopted into the Continental Army by Congress on June 14, 1775.

== Infantry ==
- New Hampshire Line: 3 regiments. These regiments were commanded by Colonels Stark, Poor, and Reed.
- Massachusetts Line: 27 regiments. These regiments were commanded by Colonels Ward, Thomas, Walker, Cotton, Whitcomb, Read, Mansfield, Danielson, Prescott, Frye, Bridge, Paterson, Scammon, Learned, Gardner, Nixon, Fellows, Doolittle, J. Brewer, D. Brewer, Heath, Woodbridge, Glover, Little, Gerrish, Phinney, and Sargent.
- Rhode Island Line: 3 regiments. These regiments were commanded by colonels Varnum, Hitchcock, and Church.
- Connecticut Line: 8 regiments. The 1st through 6th regiments were adopted by the Continental Congress on June 14, 1775. The 7th and 8th regiments were adopted by the Congress on July 19, 1775.
- New York Line: 5 regiments. On May 25 the Continental Congress voted to support a force not exceeding 3,000 men for the defense of New York. The colony of New York availed itself fully of this number, subsequently raising them as the 1st through 4th New York Regiments. Warner's Regiment, raised in the disputed New Hampshire Grants territory (present-day Vermont), was authorized on June 23, 1775.
- Pennsylvania Line: 1 regiment. The Continental Congress ordered that six companies of riflemen be raised in Pennsylvania. Pennsylvania frontiersman were so eager to participate that on June 22 Pennsylvania's quota of companies was increased to eight, organized as a regiment known as the Pennsylvania Rifle Regiment. A ninth company was added to the regiment on July 11.
- Maryland Line: 2 separate companies. The Continental Congress ordered that two companies of riflemen be raised in Maryland.
- Virginia Line: 2 regiments and 2 separate companies. The Continental Congress ordered that two companies of riflemen be raised in Virginia. On November 4, 1775, the Congress adopted the 1st and 2nd Virginia Regiments. These were existing formations that had been authorized by the colony in August and organized at Williamsburg in October.
- North Carolina Line: 2 regiments. On June 26, 1775, the Continental Congress voted to support a force not exceeding 1,000 men for the defense of North Carolina. The colony of North Carolina availed itself fully of this number, subsequently raising the 1st and 2nd North Carolina Regiments.
- South Carolina Line: 2 regiments. The Continental Congress resolved, on November 4, 1775, to adopt two infantry regiments in South Carolina. The 1st and 2nd South Carolina Regiments were existing formations that had been authorized by the colony in June.
- Georgia Line: The Continental Congress resolved, on November 4, 1775, to authorized one infantry regiment in Georgia. Georgia did not raise a regiment of its own until 1776.

Troops composing the 1st Canadian Regiment were raised by James Livingston as early as September 1775, but the formation did not receive any formal designation by the Continental Congress until January 1776. Livingston was commissioned a colonel by Brigadier General Richard Montgomery in November 1775, when the regiment was first formally recognized.

== Artillery ==
- Massachusetts: 1 regiment. The Massachusetts Artillery Regiment, under Colonel Gridley, was adopted by the Continental Congress and redesignated the Continental Artillery Regiment.
- Rhode Island: 1 company. This company had been raised by Rhode Island as the Rhode Island Train of Artillery.
- New York: 1 company. The Continental Congress authorized Lamb's Continental Artillery Company on June 30, 1775.

== Order of Battle - July 22, 1775 ==
=== Main Army ===
General George Washington

Right Wing
1st (Ward's) Division (Major General Artemas Ward)

1st (Thomas') Brigade (Brigadier General John Thomas).

- Ward's Regiment, or 1st Massachusetts Regiment. Colonel Jonathan Ward. (Designated the 21st Continental Regiment in 1776).
- Bailey's Regiment, or 2nd Massachusetts Regiment. Colonel John Bailey. (Designated the 23rd Continental Regiment in 1776).
- Cotton's Regiment, or 4th Massachusetts Regiment. Colonel Theophilus Cotton. (Consolidated in December 1775 with Bailey's Regiment, less two companies consolidated with Ward's Regiment, one company consolidated with Learned's Regiment, and one company consolidated with Gardner's Regiment).
- Danielson's Regiment, or 8th Massachusetts Regiment. Colonel Timothy Danielson. (Consolidated in December 1775 with Learned's Regiment, less one company consolidated with Nixon's Regiment and one company consolidated with Gardner's Regiment).
- Fellows' Regiment, or 17th Massachusetts Regiment. Colonel John Fellows. (Consolidated in December 1775 with Ward's Regiment, less one company consolidated with Jonathan Brewer's Regiment).
- David Brewer's Regiment, or 20th Massachusetts Regiment. Colonel David Brewer. (Consolidated in December 1775 with Read's Regiment, less one company consolidated with Jonathan Brewer's Regiment).

3rd (Spencer's) Brigade (Brigadier General Joseph Spencer).

- 2nd Connecticut Regiment (1775). Colonel Samuel Wyllys. (Used in December 1775 as cadre for the 22nd Continental Regiment).
- 6th Connecticut Regiment (1775). Colonel Samuel Holden Parsons. (Used in December 1775 as cadre for the 10th Continental Regiment).
- 8th Connecticut Regiment (1775). Colonel Jedediah Huntington. (Used in December 1775 as cadre for the 17th Continental Regiment).
- Walker's Regiment, or 3rd Massachusetts Regiment. Colonel Timothy Walker. (Consolidated in December 1775 with Read's Regiment).
- Read's Regiment, or 6th Massachusetts Regiment. Colonel Joseph Read. (Designated the 13th Continental Regiment in 1776).
- Learned's Regiment, or 14th Massachusetts Regiment. Colonel Ebenezer Learned. (Designated the 3rd Continental Regiment in 1776).

Left Wing
2nd (Lee's) Division (Major General Charles Lee)

5th (Sullivan's) Brigade (Brigadier General John Sullivan).

- 1st New Hampshire Regiment (1775). Colonel John Stark. (Designated the 5th Continental Regiment in 1776).
- 2nd New Hampshire Regiment (1775. Colonel Enoch Poor. (Designated the 8th Continental Regiment in 1776).
- 3rd New Hampshire Regiment (1775). Colonel James Reed. (Designated the 2nd Continental Regiment in 1776).
- Mansfield's Regiment, or 7th Massachusetts Regiment. Colonel John Mansfield. (Designated the 27th Continental Regiment in 1776).
- Nixon's Regiment, or 16th Massachusetts Regiment. Colonel John Nixon. (Designated the 4th Continental Regiment in 1776).
- Doolittle's Regiment, or 18th Massachusetts Regiment. Colonel Ephraim Doolittle. (Disbanded December 31, 1775).
- 7th Connecticut Regiment (1775). Colonel Charles Webb. (Used in December 1775 as cadre for the 19th Continental Regiment).

6th (Greene's) Brigade (Brigadier General Nathanael Greene)

- Varnum's Regiment (Rhode Island). Colonel James Mitchell Varnum. (Designated the 9th Continental Regiment in 1776).
- Hitchcock's Regiment (Rhode Island). Colonel Daniel Hitchcock. (Designated the 11th Continental Regiment in 1776).
- Church's Regiment (Rhode Island). Colonel Thomas Church. (Disbanded December 31, 1775).
- Whitcomb's Regiment, or 5th Massachusetts Regiment. Colonel Asa Whitcomb. (Disbanded December 31, 1775. Colonel Whitcomb took command of the 6th Continental Regiment, raised from Jonathan Brewer's Regiment).
- Read's Regiment, or 6th Massachusetts Regiment. Colonel Joseph Read. (Designated the 13th Continental Regiment in 1776).
- Gardner's Regiment, or 15th Massachusetts Regiment. Colonel Thomas Gardner. (Designated the 25th Continental Regiment in 1776).
- Jonathan Brewer's Regiment, or 19th Massachusetts Regiment. Colonel Jonathan Brewer. (Designated the 6th Continental Regiment in 1776).
- Little's Regiment, or 24th Massachusetts Regiment. Colonel Moses Little. (Designated the 12th Continental Regiment in 1776).

Reserve
3rd (Putnam's) Division (Major General Israel Putnam)

2nd (Heath's) Brigade (Brigadier General William Heath)

- Prescott's Regiment, or 9th Massachusetts Regiment. Colonel William Prescott. (Designated the 7th Continental Regiment in 1776).
- Paterson's Regiment, or 12th Massachusetts Regiment. Colonel John Paterson. (Designated the 15th Continental Regiment in 1776).
- Scammon's Regiment, or 13th Massachusetts Regiment. Colonel James Scammon. (Consolidated in December 1775 with Phinney's Regiment, less two companies consolidated with Prescott's Regiment and two companies consolidated with Paterson's Regiment).
- Greaton's Regiment, or 21st Massachusetts Regiment. Colonel John Greaton. (Designated the 24th Continental Regiment in 1776).
- Gerrish's Regiment, or 25th Massachusetts Regiment. Colonel Samuel Gerrish. (Designated the 26th Continental Regiment in 1776).
- Phinney's Regiment, or 26th Massachusetts Regiment. Colonel Edmund Phinney. (Designated the 18th Continental Regiment in 1776).

4th Brigade (vacant) (commanded by Putnam because Seth Pomeroy declined his commission)

- Frye's Regiment, or 10th Massachusetts Regiment. Colonel James Frye. (Disbanded December 31, 1775).
- Bridge's Regiment, or 11th Massachusetts Regiment. Colonel Ebenezer Bridge. (Disbanded December 31, 1775).
- Woodbridge's Regiment, or 22nd Massachusetts Regiment. Colonel Benjamin Ruggles Woodbridge. (Disbanded December 31, 1775).
- Glover's Regiment, or 23rd Massachusetts Regiment. Colonel John Glover. (Designated the 14th Continental Regiment in 1776).
- Sargent's Regiment, or 27th Massachusetts Regiment. Colonel Paul Dudley Sargent. (Designated the 16th Continental Regiment in 1776).
- 3rd Connecticut Regiment (1775). Colonel Experience Storrs. (Used in December 1775 as cadre for the 20th Continental Regiment).

Main Army infantry units not assigned to a brigade

- Pennsylvania Rifle Regiment. Colonel William Thompson. (Designated the 1st Continental Regiment in 1776; Captain William Hendricks' Company and Captain Matthew Smith's Company assigned to Northern Department September 8, 1775; marched to Quebec under Benedict Arnold; captured at Quebec December 31, 1775).
- Cresap's Independent Maryland Rifle Company. Captain Michael Cresap, June 21, 1775; Captain Moses Rawlings, October 18, 1775. (Assigned to the Maryland and Virginia Rifle Regiment, June 14, 1776).
- Price's Independent Maryland Rifle Company. Captain Thomas Price, June 21, 1775. (Assigned to the Maryland and Virginia Rifle Regiment, June 14, 1776).
- Stephenson's Independent Virginia Rifle Company. Captain Hugh Stephenson, July 1775. (Assigned to the Maryland and Virginia Rifle Regiment, June 14, 1776).
- Morgan's Independent Virginia Rifle Company. Captain Daniel Morgan, July 1775. (Assigned to the Northern Department September 8, 1775; marched to Quebec under Benedict Arnold; captured at Quebec December 31, 1775).

Main Army artillery units

- Continental Artillery Regiment (Massachusetts). Colonel Richard Gridley; Colonel Henry Knox, November 17, 1775.
- Rhode Island Train of Artillery. Captain John Crane. (Consolidated with the Continental Artillery Regiment on December 31, 1775).

=== New York Department ===
Established June 25, 1775. Merged into Middle Department, February 27, 1776.

Major General Philip Schuyler

- 1st Connecticut Regiment (1775). Brigadier General David Wooster; field commander, Lieutenant Colonel Andrew Ward.
- 4th Connecticut Regiment (1775). Colonel Benjamin Hinman.
- 5th Connecticut Regiment (1775). Colonel David Waterbury.
- 1st New York Regiment (1775–1776). Colonel Alexander McDougall (McDougall appointed brigadier general, Continental Army, August 9, 1776).
- 2nd New York Regiment (1775). Colonel Goose Van Schaick. (Designated Van Schaick's Regiment in 1776, then the 1st New York Regiment in 1777).
- 3rd New York Regiment (1775). Colonel James Clinton. (Designated the 2nd New York Regiment in 1776, then the 4th New York Regiment in 1777).
- 4th New York Regiment (1775). Colonel James Holmes. (Designated the 3rd New York Regiment in 1776, then the 2nd New York Regiment in 1777).
- Green Mountain Rangers ("Green Mountain Boys") (Vermont). Lieutenant Colonel Seth Warner.
- Canadian Regiment. Colonel James Livingston. (Redesignated the 1st Canadian Regiment in 1776).

New York Department artillery units

- Lamb's Artillery Company (New York). Captain John Lamb. (Lamb was later Colonel, 2nd Continental Artillery Regiment, 1777-1783).

Provincial units attached to New York Department

- New Hampshire Rangers. Major Timothy Bedel. (Reraised as Bedel's Regiment in 1776; continued as Whitcomb's Rangers in 1777).
