= Fort Washington (Massachusetts) =

- U.S. National Register of Historic Places
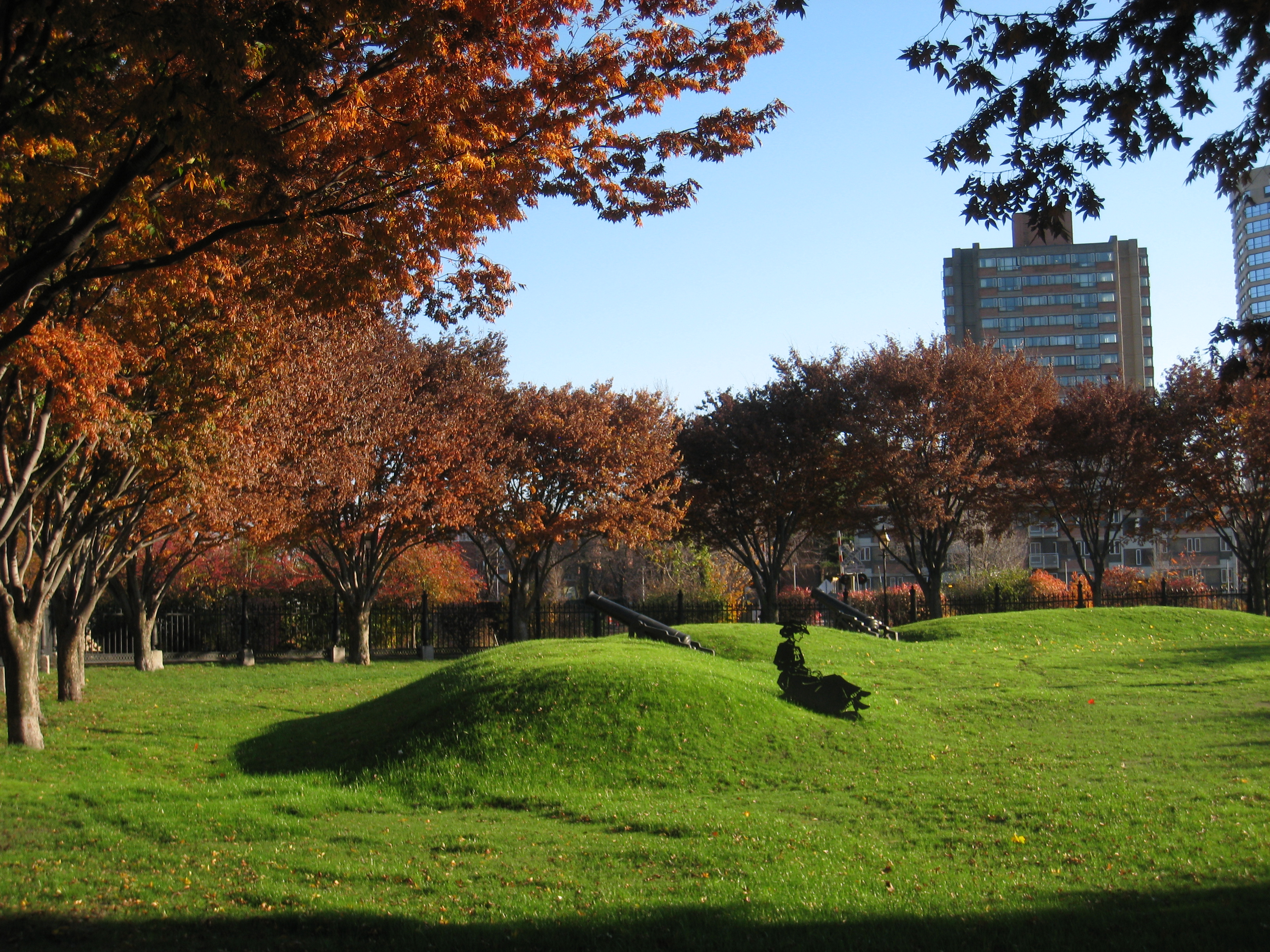
- Fort Washington

- Location within Massachusetts Location within the United States
- Location: 95 Waverly St., Cambridge, Massachusetts
- Coordinates: 42°21′23.6″N 71°6′15.4″W
- Area: 0.7 acres (0.28 ha)
- Architect: Richard Gridley
- Architectural style: Three Gun Half Moon Battery
- NRHP reference No.: 73000284
- Added to NRHP: April 3, 1973

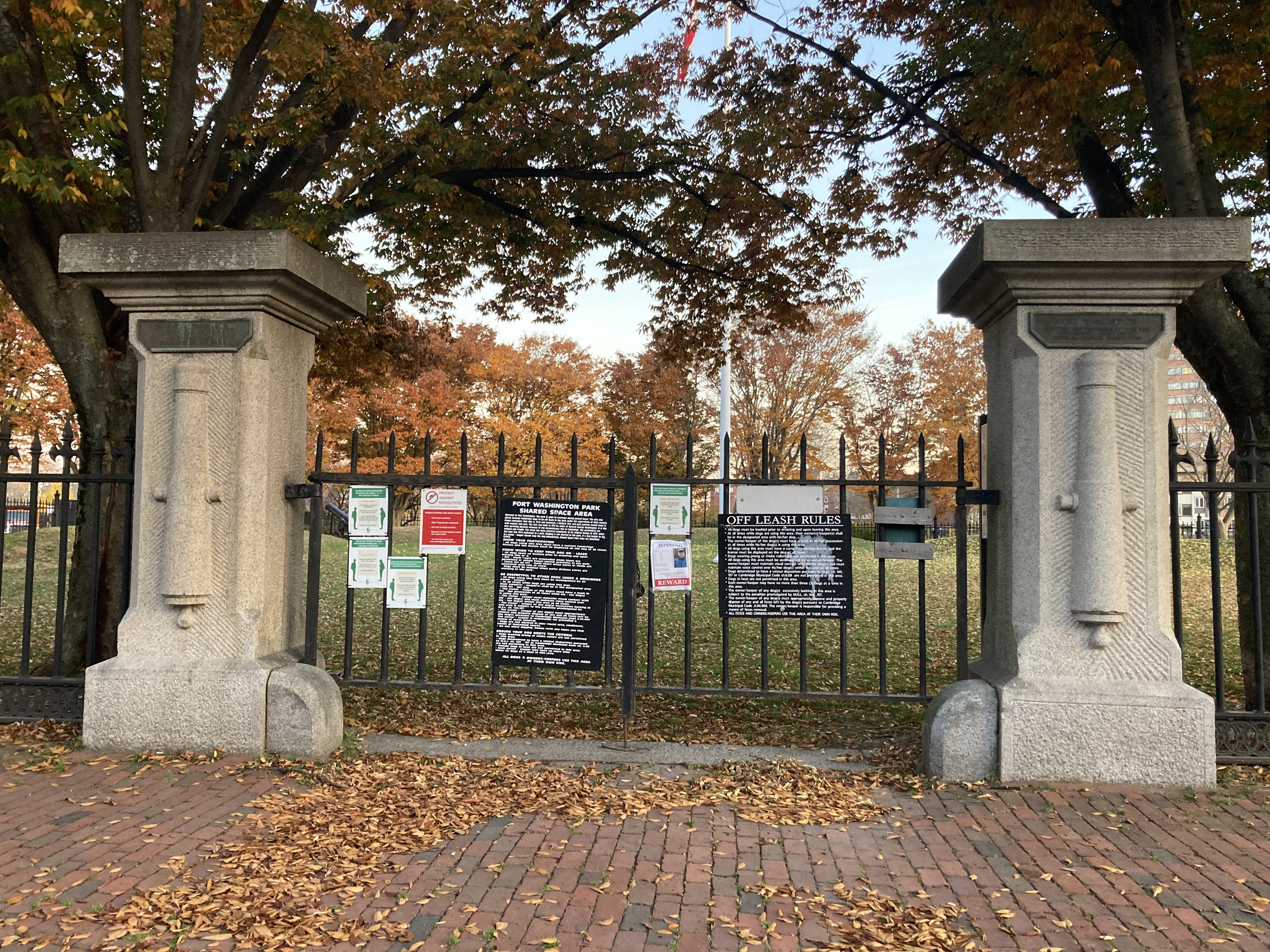
Gate of the Fort Washington Park

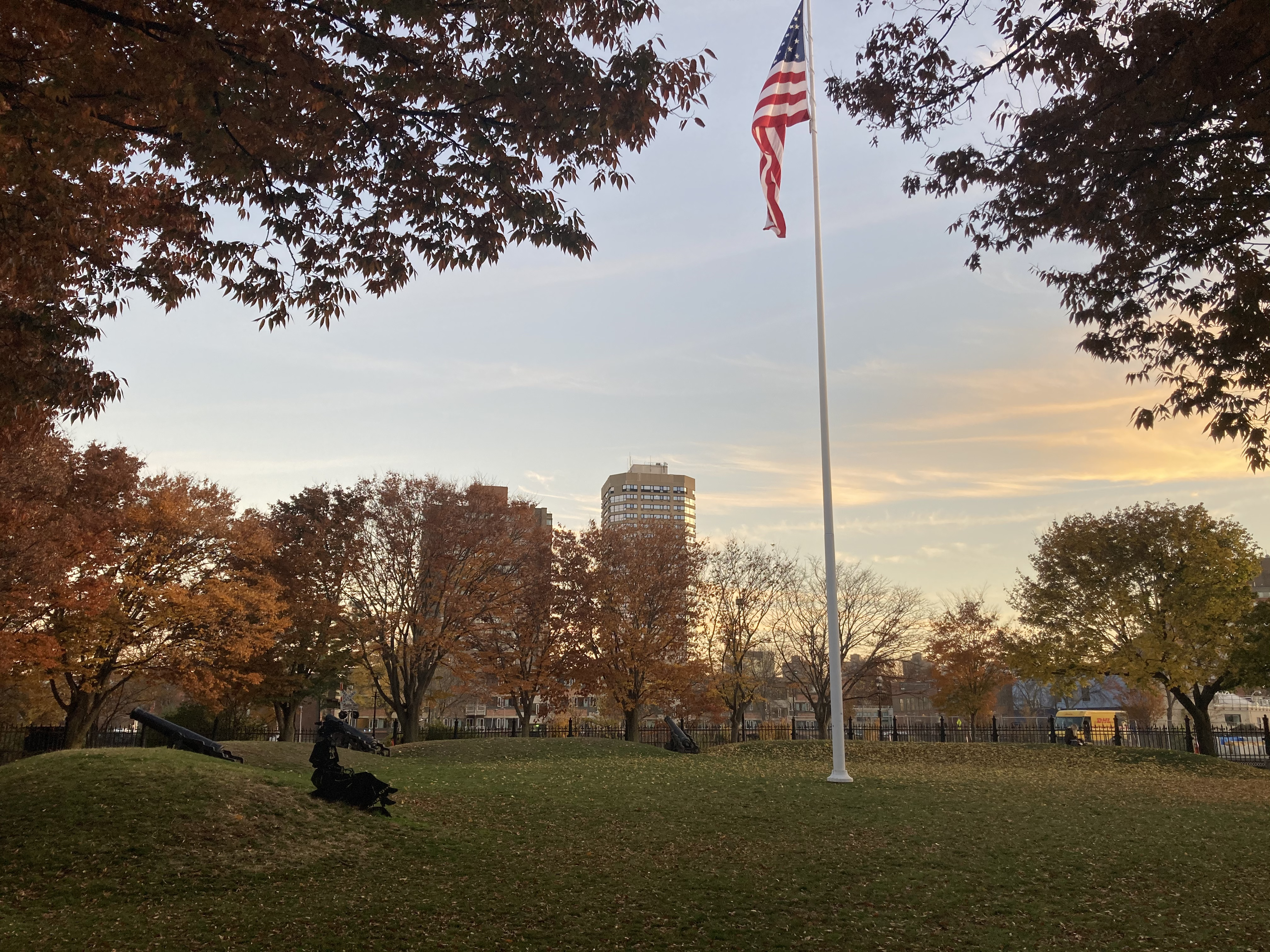
Fort Washington Park

Fort Washington, also known as Fort Washington Park, is a historic site at 95 Waverly Street in Cambridge, Massachusetts. It was built by soldiers of the Continental Army under the orders of George Washington in November 1775. It is the oldest surviving fortification from the American Revolutionary War and the only surviving fortification from the Siege of Boston. Fort Washington was placed on the List of Registered Historic Places in Massachusetts on April 3, 1973.

== History ==
=== American Revolution ===
In a letter to Joseph Reed written at Cambridge in November 1775, George Washington wrote, "I have caused two three gun half moon batteries to be thrown up for occasional use."

At the time these small fortifications were constructed, Henry Knox was on his way to Fort Ticonderoga to get the best of the cannons which were there and at Fort Crown Point, a three-month exercise known as the noble train of artillery. The troops needed to be trained in constructing works in which the guns could be mounted promptly.

=== Post war ===
The property was acquired by the City of Cambridge and restored in 1857, at which time three 18-pounder cannons from the old Fort Winthrop, located on Governor's Island, were installed, and an elaborate granite and iron fence was designed by architect John R. Hall to protect the site.

A description of the property at the time of that transfer was later compiled by local historians:

The three gun battery at the foot of Allston Street retains the semblance of a fort, and is called Fort Washington. The land where this battery was thrown up had been held in common from the close of the Revolution till 1857, when it was deeded to the city by the following persons: Edmund T. and Elizabeth Hastings, Mary E. Dana, Joseph A. and Penelope Willard, John and Hannah B. Bartlett. A fund of $800 was also turned over to the city, by these people who cared for this plot of historic land. The conditions named include "that the above premises when suitably enclosed and adorned by said city, shall forever remain open for light, air, and adornment, for the convenience and accommodation of the owners of estates in said Pine Grove, and of the Public generally." The city accepted this gift and with the assistance of Commonwealth of Massachusetts proceeded to restore the battery to its original condition, to build a substantial fence around it and to erect a flag-staff. The Secretary of War gave three 30-pounder guns (actually, Eighteen Pound American guns), and the Secretary of the Navy gave the gun carriages. The Massachusetts State Legislature voted to appropriate the sum of $2,000 "provided the city of Cambridge shall appropriate a sum sufficient to complete the said fence at a cost of not less than four thousand dollars and said Fort Washington shall always be accessible to the public, and that said city shall always keep the fence proposed to built, [sic?] in good repair."

The Cambridge city directory of 1861 reported the earthworks to be five years old in appearance and in excellent condition; the total cost of Fort Washington Park, was $9,504.05. In 1965 the state passed legislation authorizing the city of Cambridge to transfer the park to the United States government as a historic landmark.

The property remains a city park and is designated an historic district of the City of Cambridge. The park was rededicated on October 3, 2009, Cambridgeport History Day, following restoration work. What remains today are only grassy embankments, not substantial fortifications.

== Cannons ==
The guns standing in the embrasures are 18-pounders and were cast during or shortly after the Revolution. The two 18-pound cannon at Stonington were cast in 1781 in Salisbury, Connecticut during the Revolution. There are also two 18-pound cannon at Mount Defiance in Ticonderoga, New York which are also from the Revolution and of a similar cast.

The three 18-pounders were among those over-age cannon that were removed from the original Fort Warren on Governor's Island, when a new Fort Warren was built on George's Island. Mr. Marcus Morton, of Cambridge, learned by correspondence with the Historical Section of the Chief of Ordnance in Washington, in 1942, that the gun carriages were cast by the West Point Foundry on the Hudson River, and he discovered in the city records that it cost the city $13.50 to bring these guns from Governor's Island to Cambridge.

These cannon are identical, except for the numbers and weights marked upon them. They are numbered 45, 36, and 40; and their weighs are shown as 30-0-13, 30-0-17, and 30-0-16, respectively, (in cwt., qrs., and lbs.). Those figures correspond to 3375, 3377, and 3376 pounds. The bore is approximately 5 5/8 inches; the diameter of an 18-pound sphere of cast iron is 5.1 inches; the excess diameter of the bore (called windage) was usually about ¼ inch, or a little bit more, to allow for irregularities in the bore of the guns and the casting of the balls. The next larger standard size for cannon of that period was 24 lb., which would require a bore of at least 5.9 inches.

== Image gallery ==
The following images are from the Library of Congress, Historic American Buildings Survey, Survey number HABS MA-2-48, MARCH 1934:.

Historic American Buildings Survey (Library of Congress)3-1934-1

Historic American Buildings Survey (Library of Congress)3-1934-2

Historic American Buildings Survey (Library of Congress)3-1934-3

Historic American Buildings Survey (Library of Congress)3-1934-4

== See also ==
- National Register of Historic Places listings in Cambridge, Massachusetts
- List of military installations in Massachusetts
