= John Roulstone Hall =

American architect

John Roulstone Hall (1826–1911) was an American architect in Boston.

== Work ==
- Eustis Street Fire House at 20 Eustis Street in Roxbury's Dudley Square
- Fort Washington (Massachusetts) site additions (1857), 95 Waverly Street Cambridge, Massachusetts
- Hollis Street Theatre (1885) and 17 years later its remodeling and redecoration
- Massachusetts State House dome and cupola restoration
- 48 Commonwealth Avenue in the Back Bay
- 56 Linwood St, Roxbury (1859)
