= Rhode Island Line =

State-specific military contingency of the Continental Line

The Rhode Island Line was a formation within the Continental Army. The term "Rhode Island Line" referred to the quota of numbered infantry regiments assigned to Rhode Island at various times by the Continental Congress. These, together with similar contingents from the other twelve states, formed the Continental Line. The concept was particularly important in relation to the promotion of commissioned officers. Officers of the Continental Army below the rank of brigadier general were ordinarily ineligible for promotion except in the line of their own state.

Not all Continental infantry regiments raised in a state were part of a state quota, however. On December 27, 1776, the Continental Congress gave Washington temporary control over certain military decisions that the Congress ordinarily regarded as its own prerogative. These "dictatorial powers" included the authority to raise sixteen additional Continental infantry regiments at large.

Early in 1777, Washington offered command of one of these additional regiments to Ezekiel Cornell of Rhode Island. Cornell declined in order to command a brigade of Rhode Island state troops.

Washington also offered command of an additional regiment to Henry Sherburne of Rhode Island, who accepted. In 1776, Sherburne has served with distinction at the Battle of The Cedars. Half of Sherburne's Regiment was drawn from Rhode Island and half from Connecticut.

Still other Continental infantry regiments and smaller units, also unrelated to a state quota, were raised as needed for special or temporary service.

== Rhode Island provincial regiments, 1775 ==
On April 23, 1775, the Massachusetts Provincial Congress voted to raise a volunteer force of 13,600 men, and it called upon the other New England colonies for assistance in raising an army of 30,000 men.

In response, the Rhode Island Assembly voted, on May 6, 1775, to contribute 1,500 men to this army. The Rhode Island troops were formed into a brigade of three infantry regiments. Nathanael Greene was the brigade commander. Two of the regiments had eight companies each, and one of the regiments had seven companies. (The Rhode Island Train of Artillery, which was a part of this force, brought the brigade's strength up to 24 companies). Rhode Island infantry regiments initially had an official establishment of 487 officers and men in eight companies (but one regiment had only 427 men in seven companies). The troops were enlisted to serve until December 31, 1775.

The legislation of the Rhode Island Assembly which created this force described it as an army of observation. This term was also used for the forces raised by the four New England colonies to observe the British garrison in Boston, Massachusetts.

Massachusetts requested reinforcements from the other New England colonies following the Battle of Bunker Hill. Rhode Island responded, on June 28, 1775, by raising six new companies and assigning two companies to each Rhode Island regiment.

In an effort to weld the separate New England armies into a single "Continental" Army, on August 5, 1775, General Washington ordered that a board be convened to determine the rank of the regiments at Boston. The board was to consist of a brigadier general as moderator and six field officers as members. It completed its task on August 20, 1775, and reported its decision to Washington. The regiments of infantry in the Continental Army were accordingly numbered without reference to their colony of origin. There were thirty-nine "Regiments of Foot in the Army of the United Colonies." In General Orders, Washington often referred to his regiments by these numbers; and they appear in the strength reports compiled by Adjutant General Horatio Gates.

Varnum's Regiment was commanded by Colonel James Mitchell Varnum. In August 1775, Varnum's Regiment was designated "The 12th Regiment of Foot." It served in the siege of Boston until its term of service expired on December 31, 1775. It was reorganized the next day, January 1, 1776, as the 9th Continental Regiment.

Hitchcock's Regiment was commanded by Colonel Daniel Hitchcock. In August 1775, Hitchcock's Regiment was designated "The 14th Regiment of Foot." It served in the siege of Boston until its term of service expired on December 31, 1775. It was reorganized the next day, January 1, 1776, as the 11th Continental Regiment.

Church's Regiment was commanded by Colonel Thomas Church. In August 1775, Church's Regiment was designated "The 15th Regiment of Foot." It served in the siege of Boston until its term of service expired on December 31, 1775, when it was disbanded.

== Numbered Continental regiments, 1776 ==
On November 4, 1775, the Continental Congress resolved that on January 1, 1776, the Continental Army, exclusive of artillery and extras, should consist of 27 infantry regiments: 1 from Pennsylvania, 3 from New Hampshire, 16 from Massachusetts, 2 from Rhode Island, and 5 from Connecticut. Each regiment was to have an official establishment of 728 officers and men in eight companies. The regiments were to receive numbers instead of names, and the troops were to be enlisted to serve until December 31, 1776.

For the campaign of 1776 Rhode Island was to provide the 9th and 11th Continental regiments.

- 9th Continental Regiment.
- 11th Continental Regiment.

== The line in 1777 ==
- 1st Rhode Island Regiment – Organized on January 1, 1777, from the 9th Continental Regiment. Consolidated with the 2nd Rhode Island Regiment on January 1, 1781, and re-designated the Rhode Island Regiment. Re-designated as Olney's Rhode Island Battalion on May 14, 1781. Disbanded on December 25, 1783.
- 2nd Rhode Island Regiment – Organized on January 1, 1777, from the 11th Continental Regiment. Consolidated with the 1st Rhode Island Regiment on January 1, 1781, to form the Rhode Island Regiment.
