= Hollis Street Theatre =

Coordinates: 42°21′0.22″N 71°3′52.14″W

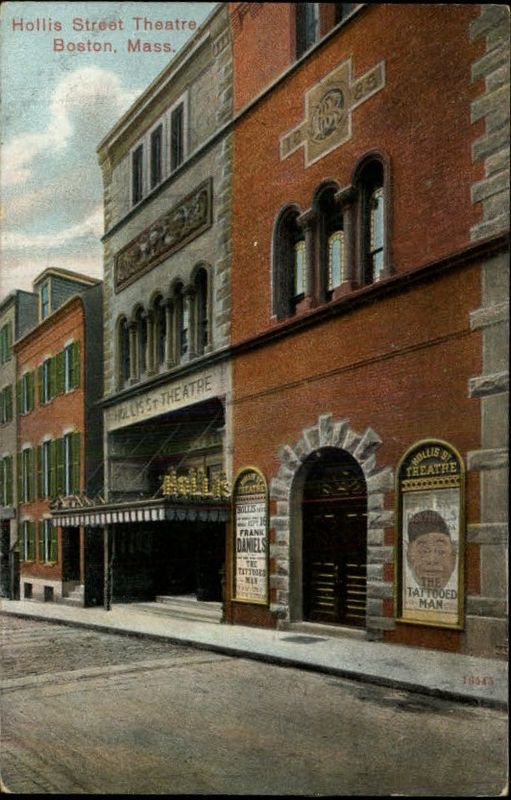
The Hollis Street Theatre on a postcard, c. 1907

The Hollis Street Theatre (1885–1935) was a theatre in Boston, Massachusetts, that presented dramatic plays, opera, musical concerts, and other entertainments.

== Brief history ==
Boston architect John R. Hall designed the 1,600-seat theatre in 1885, on the site of the former Hollis Street Church. The interior was designed by Zachariah Mode, who also designed the interior of the Colonial Theater in Boston.

On opening night,

The new theatre was crowded to-night by an audience which came from among the best people in Boston. The street was crowded with people in the afternoon, and it was almost impossible to get near the doors at the time they were opened. People holding tickets met with great difficulty in getting in, so that the audience was not entirely seated until some time after the curtain should have risen. As soon as they did get in, however, they found a roomy, gorgeous interior fitted up with every attention to comfort and decorated brightly in gold, blue, and white. Most of the tickets had been sold in advance by auction, and it has been impossible for several days to secure places for the opening performance. ... The Mikado ... made an immense hit to-night.

The many shows presented at the theatre featured a number of notables, including Maurice Barrymore, Sarah Bernhardt, William Gillette, Henry Irving, Doris Keane, Julia Marlowe and Ellen Terry. Others associated with the theatre included Isaac B. Rich; Edward E. Rice; Charles Frohmann.

The building was demolished in 1935.

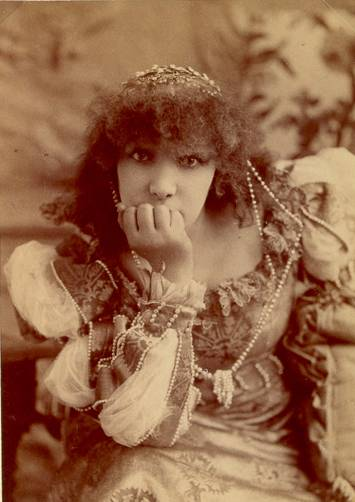
Sarah Bernhardt

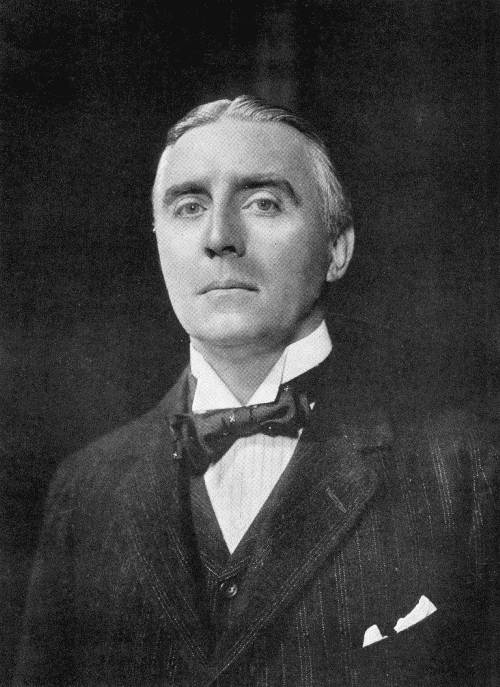
E.H. Sothern

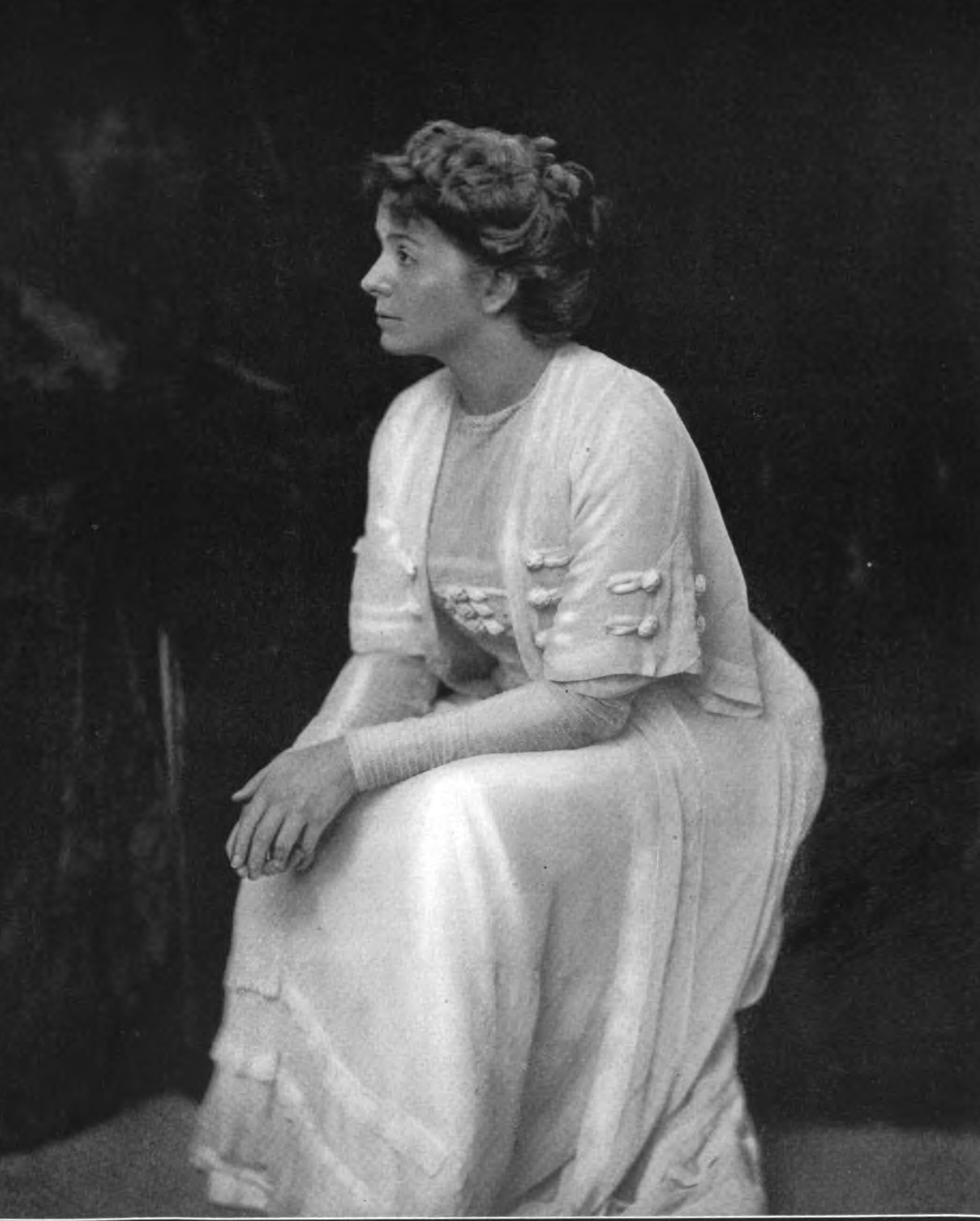
Maude Adams

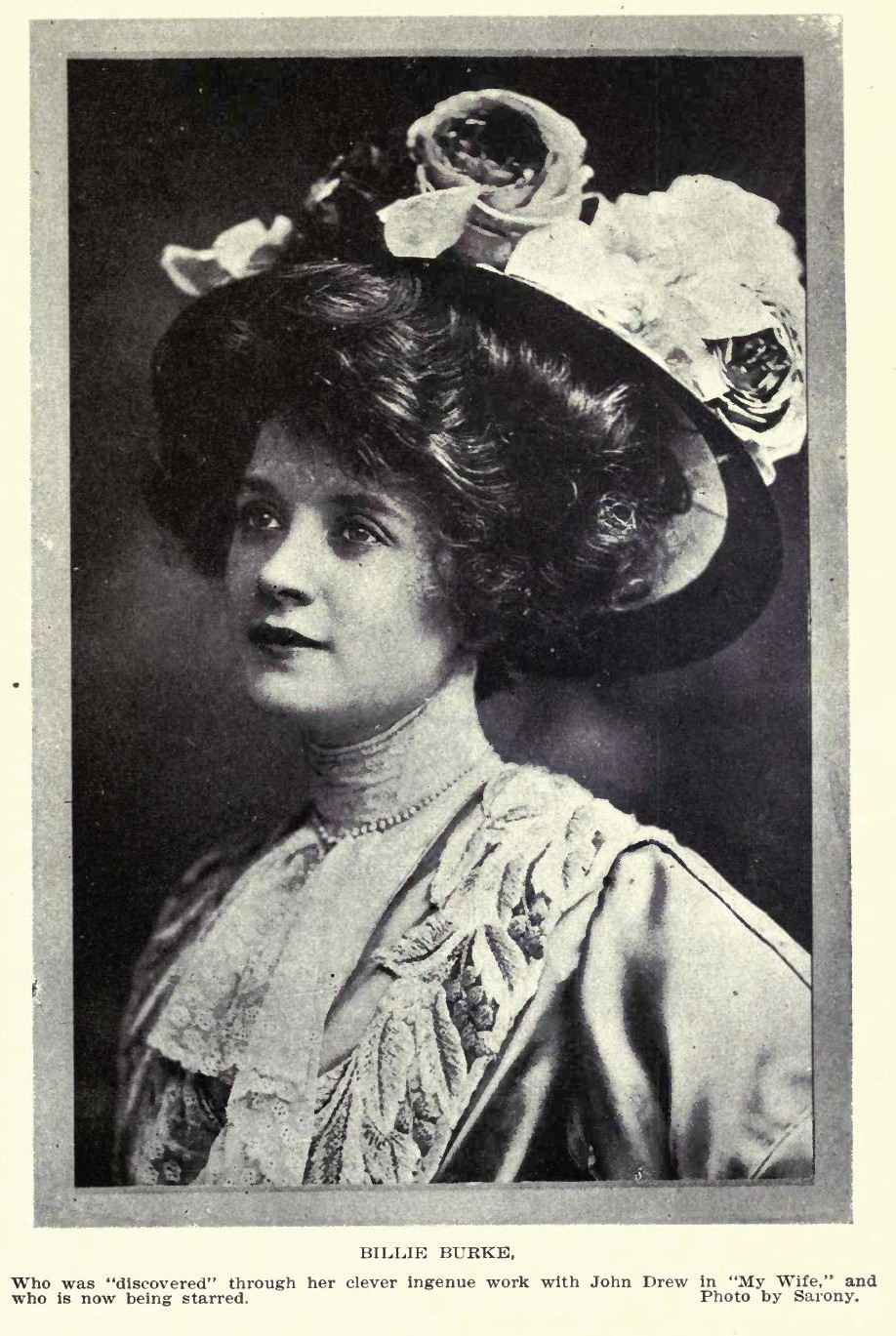
Billie Burke

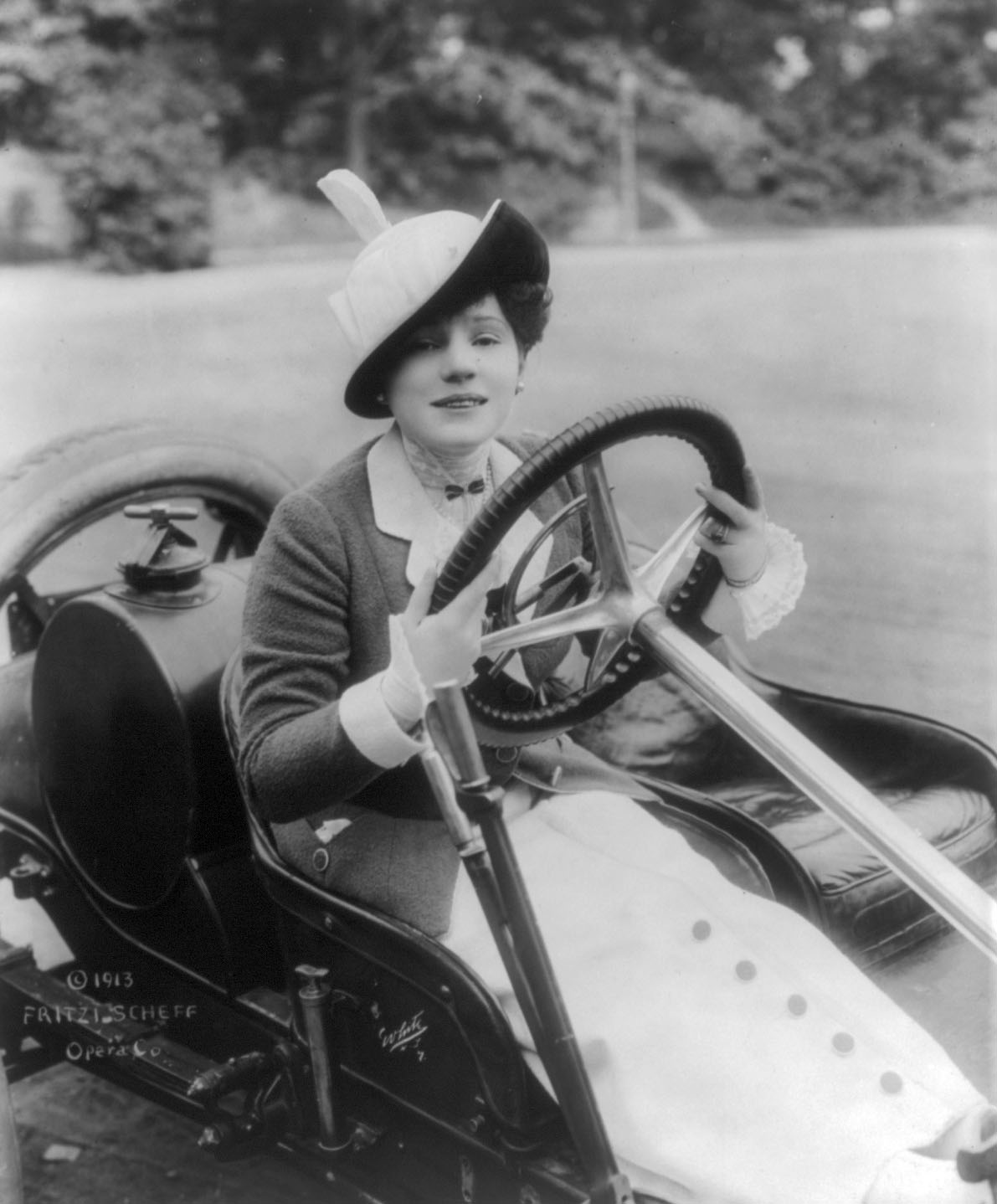
Fritzi Scheff

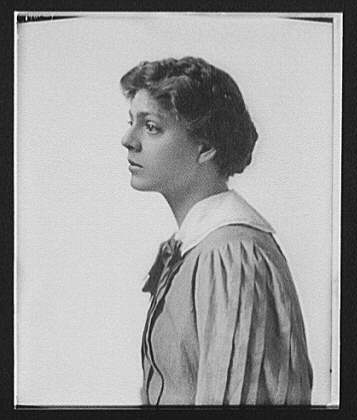
Ethel Barrymore

== Selected shows ==
- 1885 - The Mikado by Gilbert and Sullivan; with D'Oyly Carte, John Stetson's company, Arthur Wilkinson, S. Cadwallader, John Howson, Signor Brocolini, Laura Clement, Hattie Delaro, Rosa Cooke.
- 1886 - Nanon by F. Zell and Richard Genée; with Carleton Opera Co.
- 1887
  - Daniela by Felix Phillippi; with Helena Modjeska
  - Twelfth Night by Shakespeare; with Helen Modjeska
  - Fedora by Victorien Sardou, with Sarah Bernhardt
- 1888
  - Uncle Tom's Cabin
  - Cuisla-M-Chree by Dion Boucicault
- 1892
  - Richelieu by Edward Bulwer Lytton; with Daniel Goddard Crandon
  - Hess and Hoss
  - Men and Women
- 1896 - A Good Thing, with Peter F. Daily (approximate date)
- 1897 - The Devil's Disciple, Richard Mansfield, December 27, 1897
- 1901 - Sherlock Holmes
- 1903
  - Skipper & Co., Wall St. by H.J.W. Dam; with Maclyn Arbuckle
  - Markheim, with E. H. Sothern
- 1907 - The Great Galeoto by Jose Echegaray
- 1908 - The Boy and the Girl by Richard Carle and H.L Heartz
- 1909
  - Lady Frederick
  - Love Watches
- 1910
  - What Every Woman Knows by J. M. Barrie, with Maude Adams
  - The Sham, with Henrietta Crosman
  - The Traveling Salesman
  - Mrs. Dot by Somerset Maugham; with Billie Burke
  - The Prince Duma by Henry Blossom and Victor Herbert; with Fritzi Scheff
  - The Pillars of Society by Henrik Ibsen; with Mrs. Fiske
  - Mid-Channel by Arthur Wing Pinero, with Ethel Barrymore
  - The Prosecutor by Franklin Searight; with Emmett Corrigan
  - Russian Balalaika Orchestra
- 1912
  - The Attack
- 1912
  - Rebecca of Sunnybrook Farm by Kate Douglas Wiggin and Charlotte Thompson
- 1913
  - The Mind the Paint Girl by Arthur Wing Pinero; with Billie Burke
  - Kismet; with Otis Skinner
- 1915
  - Grumpy
  - Sherlock Holmes written by and starring William Gillette with Edward Fielding as Watson
- 1916 - Daddy Long Legs
- 1917 - Come out of the Kitchen by A.E. Thomas
- 1919 - Dear Brutus by J. M. Barrie
- 1920 - The Czarina featuring Doris Keane by Melchior Lengyel and Lajos Bíró and adapted by Edward Sheldon
- 1924 - The Nervous Wreck by Owen Davis
- 1928 - The American Opera Company (Mar 12 through Mar 24)
