= Continental Artillery Regiment =

Gridley's Continental Artillery Regiment Knox's Continental Artillery Regiment
- Active: 1775–1777
- Country: United States
- Allegiance: (United States) Continental Congress
- Branch: Continental Army
- Type: Artillery
- Size: 10 to 12 companies
- Nickname(s): Knox's Continental Artillery
- Colors: Blue or black coat and red facings
- Engagements: Battle of Bunker Hill (1775); Siege of Boston (1775–1776); Dorchester Heights (1776); Battle of Long Island (1776); Battle of White Plains (1776); Battle of Fort Washington (1776); Battle of Valcour Island (1776); Battle of Trenton (1776)

Commanders
- Notable commanders: Colonel Richard Gridley; Colonel Henry Knox

The Continental Artillery Regiment, also known as Gridley's Continental Artillery Regiment or Knox's Continental Artillery Regiment, was the only large American unit of artillery in the early part of the American Revolutionary War. It was authorized on 10 May 1775 as the Regiment of the Train of Artillery in the Massachusetts State Troops. In May and June, the regiment assembled at Cambridge, Massachusetts in the strength of 10 batteries. Men from five counties were recruited. It became part of the Continental Army on 14 June 1775 as the Continental Artillery Regiment with Colonel Richard Gridley in command. A few days later at Bunker Hill, the American artillery was not handled well. The regiment was reorganized into 11 companies at the end of June.

Colonel Henry Knox took over command from the elderly Gridley on 17 November 1775. He immediately began the task of hauling the noble train of artillery from captured Fort Ticonderoga to Cambridge. This assignment was completed by the end of January. On 1 January 1776 the Rhode Island Train of Artillery merged with the Continental Artillery Regiment to form 12 companies altogether. There were two Rhode Island companies, those of Captains Ebenezer Stevens and Jotham Drury. The Fortification of Dorchester Heights in March 1776, in which Knox's artillery regiment was a critical component, hastened the end of the Siege of Boston.

Knox's regiment participated in the New York and New Jersey Campaign during the summer and fall of 1776. The actions in which cannons were employed were the battles of Long Island, White Plains, and Fort Washington. Elements of the regiment also defended Lake Champlain. Knox's guns were crucial in winning the Battle of Trenton in late December 1776. The regiment was disbanded on 1 January 1777 and replaced by four newly raised artillery regiments.

== Service record ==
Designation	Date	Department	Size
Massachusetts Train of Artillery	10 May 1775	Massachusetts	10 companies
Continental Artillery Regiment	14 June 1775	Main Army	10 companies
Continental Artillery Regiment	Late June 1775	Main Army	11 companies
Continental Artillery Regiment	1 January 1776	Main Army	12 companies
Continental Artillery Regiment	1 January 1777	Main Army	disbanded
