= 12th Continental Regiment =

Little's Regiment 12th Continental Regiment
- Active: April 23, 1775–January 1, 1777
- Disbanded: January 1, 1777
- Allegiance: Continental Congress of the United States
- Type: Infantry
- Part of: Massachusetts Line
- Engagements: American Revolutionary War: Siege of Boston; New York and New Jersey campaign

Commanders
- Notable commanders: Colonel Moses Little

The 12th Continental Regiment was raised April 23, 1775, as a Massachusetts militia regiment at Cambridge, Massachusetts, under Colonel Moses Little. The regiment would join the Continental Army in June 1775. The regiment saw action during the Siege of Boston, the New York Campaign and the Battle of Trenton. The regiment was disbanded on January 1, 1777, at Morristown, New Jersey.
