= Church's Regiment =

Church's Regiment (a.k.a. 3rd Rhode Island Regiment) was a unit of the Continental Army raised in Rhode Island which served from May 3, 1775 to December 31, 1775 in the American Revolutionary War.

== Organization ==
In May 1775 the Rhode Island General Assembly voted to raise a brigade of three regiments to join the Army of Observation which was surrounding Boston to preclude the British forces there from attacking the surrounding areas. (The Army of Observation consisted of mobilized militia units from Massachusetts, Connecticut, New Hampshire and Rhode Island and became the Continental Army when General George Washington assumed command, under a commission from the Continental Congress on July 3, 1775.)

Of the three Rhode Island regiments, one regiment was raised in Providence County, another in Kent and Kings Counties and the third, Church's Regiment, was raised in Newport County and Bristol County. The regiment was commanded by Colonel Thomas Church who had previously served as lieutenant colonel of the Bristol County regiment of the Rhode Island Militia and as a justice of the Inferior Court of Common Pleas.

The regiment consisted of a total of nine companies, each with 3 officers and 57 enlisted men. The regiment had a total authorized strength of 550 officers and men.

== Service ==
Along with the two other Rhode Island regiments raised in May 1775 (Varnum's and Hitchcock's), Church's Regiment served in the Siege of Boston in a brigade commanded by Brigadier General Nathanael Greene.

The regiment was discharged at the end of 1775 along with the rest of the Continental Army due to the expiration of enlistments. Soldiers from the regiment who desired to stay in the Army enlisted for one year in one of the other two Rhode Island regiments which were re-designated at the beginning of 1776 as the 9th Continental Infantry and the 11th Continental Infantry.

== Senior Officers ==
- Colonel Thomas Church
- Lieutenant Colonel William T. Miller
- Major John Forrester
- Major Henry Sherburne

== See also ==
- 1st Rhode Island Regiment
- 2nd Rhode Island Regiment
- Continental Army
- List of Continental Army units (1775)
