= Moses Little =

Moses Little (1724–1798), born on May 8, 1724, in Newbury, Massachusetts. Moses Little served in the Massachusetts militia and with his company marched to the Battles of Lexington and Concord on April 19, 1775. After Lexington and Concord, Moses Little was promoted to colonel of the newly formed 12th Continental Regiment and led that regiment at the Battle of Bunker Hill, the New York Campaign and the battles of Trenton and Princeton. In 1777 Colonel Little retired from the Continental Army. Colonel Little was offered the command of the Penobscot Expedition in 1779 by the State of Massachusetts but turned it down. Colonel Little suffered a stroke in 1781 and lost his speech. In 1784, Littleton, New Hampshire, was named in Colonel Little's honor. He died on May 27, 1798.
