= Richard Gridley =

Continental Army officer (1710–1796)

Richard Gridley (3 January 1710 – 21 June 1796) was a soldier and engineer who served for the British Army during the French and Indian Wars and for the Continental Army during the American Revolutionary War.

== Early life and military career ==
Gridley was born in Boston, Massachusetts in 1710. He married Hannah Deming on 25 February 1730. They had nine children. He served as a military engineer during the French and Indian Wars from the reduction of Fortress Louisbourg in 1745 to the fall of Quebec. For his services he was awarded a captain's commission in 65th, or Shirley's Regiment of Foot, a grant of the Magdalen Islands, 3,000 acres (12 km^{2}) of land in New Hampshire, and a life annuity. Placed on half-pay in 1749, he was colonel of a Massachusetts provincial regiment during William Johnson's 1755 expedition against Fort Saint-Frédéric. In John Winslow's failed 1756 expedition against Fort Saint-Frédéric, he served as provincial colonel of artillery and chief engineer. He vehemently supported Winslow's resistance against a merger of the regular and provincial forces.

Gridley sided with the Thirteen Colonies during the American Revolutionary War and was made Chief Engineer in the New England Provincial Army. He laid out the defenses on Breed's Hill and was wounded at the Battle of Bunker Hill. When the Continental Congress first created a Continental Army under command of George Washington in 1775 Gridley was named to Chief Engineer (artillery). He directed the construction of the fortifications on Dorchester Heights which forced the British to evacuate Boston in March 1776. When Washington moved his army south, Gridley remained as Chief Engineer of the Eastern Department.

== Later life and death ==
Gridley retired in 1781, at age 70. He died from blood poisoning induced by cutting dogwood bushes, in Stoughton, Massachusetts, and is buried in Canton, Massachusetts, at the Canton Corner Cemetery. He was buried within a small enclosure near his house in what is now Canton, off Washington Street. In this spot his body rested until 28 October 1876, when a committee disinterred his remains and removed them to his final resting place in the Canton Corner Cemetery. A small queue (braided hair) was removed and pocketed during the exhumation and today is on display at the Canton Historical Society.

== Legacy ==
The monument to Gridley at Canton Corner is of Quincy Granite and the dado of Randolph Granite are faced with polished tablets bearing several inscriptions including "I shall fight for justice and my country", "I love my God, my country, and my neighbor as myself.", and a quote by General Washington: "I know of no man better fitted to be Chief Engineer than General Gridley." The whole monument is surmounted by a cannon in the imitation of "Hancock" or "Adams," - one of the guns Gridley served with his own hands at Bunker Hill.

Gridley is widely to be understood as one of the most distinguished military characters of New England, renowned for personal bravery, skilled artillerist, a scientific engineer, and a contemporary of Prescott and Putnam and Knox, of Warren and Washington.

The United States Army Corps of Engineers considers Gridley 'America's First Chief Engineer'.

== Notes ==
This article contains public domain text from "Colonel Richard Gridley". Portraits and Profiles of Chief Engineers. Archived from the original on 4 April 2005.

Military offices
New office	Chief Engineer of the Continental Army; 1775 – 1776	Succeeded by Colonel Rufus Putnam
