= Light Infantry Division at Yorktown (1781) =

- Active: Sept 24, 1781 - Nov 2, 1781
- Allegiance: Continental Congress of the United States
- Branch: Army
- Type: Light Infantry
- Part of: Yorktown order of battle
- Engagements: Siege of Yorktown

Commanders
- Notable commanders: Major General Lafayette

The Light Infantry Division was a large unit of the Continental Army that fought in the American Revolutionary War. It was formed by unifying the detached light infantry companies from several infantry regiments in September 1781. Its two brigades were made up of three battalions each, though the second brigade was later reorganized into four. The light infantry were regarded as the elite troops of the army. As such they participated in an important assault during the Siege of Yorktown in October 1781.

== History ==
Major General Gilbert du Motier, Marquis de Lafayette commanded the light infantry division at the Siege of Yorktown, and it comprised two brigades. These brigades were formed on Washington's orders of 24 September 1781. This division was on the American right flank with the infantry division under Major General Benjamin Lincoln.

The 1st Brigade was commanded by Brigadier General Peter Muhlenberg, and consisted of the light infantry brigade that was formed on 1 February 1781 and which was initially commanded by LaFayette. Companies of this brigade originally were authorized twenty-five men, but on 16 February 1781 Washington ordered that this become fifty men, making the size consistent with his orders of 1 November 1780 that described the composition of the Army and size of units to take effect on 1 January 1781. The companies that comprised this unit were the designated light infantry companies for their respective regiments as designated in Washington's orders of 1 November 1781.

The light infantry division performed two notable services during the Siege of Yorktown. The first was to participate through fatigues and pickets in the advance of the American lines around Yorktown; this work began on in earnest on 30 September 1781. The second was to capture Redoubt #10 on the night of 14 October 1781.

== Organization ==
The 1st Brigade consisted of three provisional Continental battalions:

- Vose's Battalion, Colonel Joseph Vose (1st Massachusetts Regiment), light infantry companies of the 1st through 8th Massachusetts Regiments;
- Gimat's Battalion, Lieutenant Colonel Jean-Joseph Sourbader de Gimat, light infantry companies of the 9th and 10th Massachusetts, the Rhode Island Regiment, and the 1st through 5th Connecticut Regiments; (The Rhode Island Light Company under the command of Captain Steven Olney was formed primarily of white veteran soldiers of the Second Rhode Island Regiment. The so-called Rhode Island "Black Regiment" was formed in May 1778 from one veteran colored company of 1777 (serving detached at Valley Forge with the Second Rhode Island Regiment) and four recruit companies of primarily ex-slaves in Rhode Island. Captain Olney's Company never was part of the Black 1st Regiment. Olney's Company had been detached with Lafayette in February 1781 when the Rhode Island Regiment was created at "Rhode Island Village" [modern day Mahopac Falls, New York]. With a commission dating to 1777, Captain Stephen Olney was the senior captain of Gimat's Battalion, and the Rhode Island Light Company led the van of Gimat's Battalion at Redoubt 10.)
- Barber's Battalion, Lieutenant Colonel Francis Barber (1st New Jersey Regiment), light infantry companies of the 1st and 2nd New Hampshire Regiments, the Canadian Regiment, and the 1st and 2nd New Jersey Regiments. Three companies of the New Jersey Line were also attached to the battalion.

The 2nd Brigade was commanded by Brigadier General (brevet) Moses Hazen, and comprised the:

- Canadian Regiment, Lieutenant Colonel Edward Antill
- Scammell's light infantry corps, Lieutenant Colonel Alexander Scammell, three provisional light infantry companies from Connecticut, three from Massachusetts, and two from New Hampshire, formed on 17 May 1781,
- Hamilton's Battalion, Lieutenant Colonel Alexander Hamilton, light infantry companies of the 1st and 2d New York Regiments and two provisional companies from Connecticut, formed 31 July 1781.

Scammell was wounded and taken prisoner on September 29, 1781, and died on October 4. On October 8, the light infantry companies of the 2nd Brigade were reorganized into three battalions, the first consisting of three New Hampshire and two Connecticut provisional companies (commanded by Lieutenant Colonel John Laurens), the second four Connecticut companies (commanded by Lieutenant Colonel Ebenezer Huntington), and the third by Hamilton, with the Massachusetts companies exchanged for his former Connecticut companies.

== Notes ==
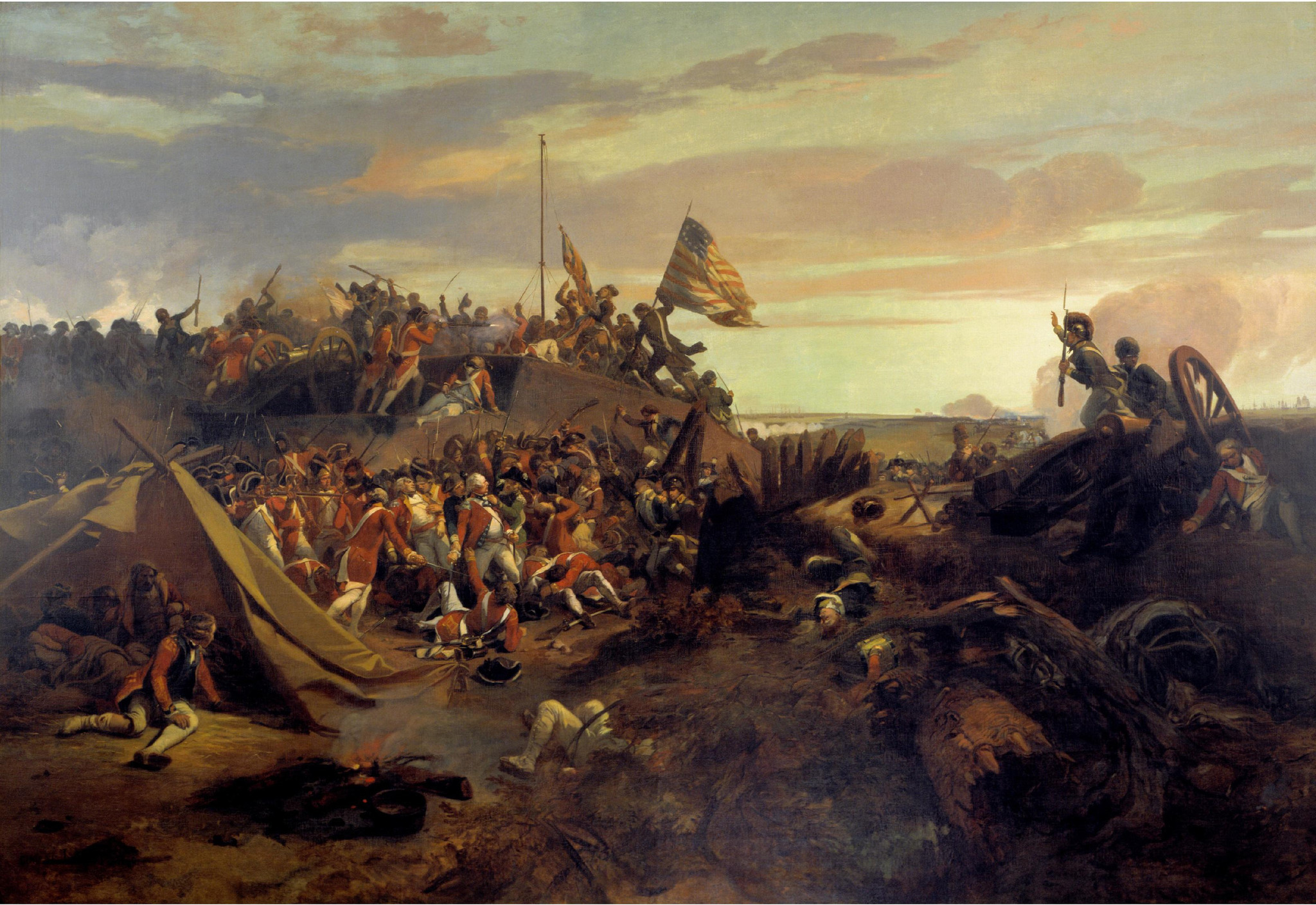
The storming of Redoubt #10, by Eugene Lami.
