= Hamtramck (disambiguation) =

Hamtramck is a French surname. Notable people with the surname include:

- Jean François Hamtramck (1756–1803), Canadian-born American military officer
- John F. Hamtramck (1798–1858), American military officer
- John Francis Hamtramck Claiborne (1809–1884), American politician

== See also ==
- Hamtramck, Michigan, city
