= 3rd New Hampshire Regiment =

- Active: 1775-1781
- Allegiance: Continental Congress of the United States
- Branch: Army
- Type: Line infantry
- Part of: New Hampshire Line
- Engagements: Battle of Bunker Hill; Battles of Saratoga; Sullivan Expedition; Battle of Newtown

Commanders
- Notable commanders: Colonel James Reed; Colonel Alexander Scammell; LTC Henry Dearborn

The 3rd New Hampshire Regiment, also known as the 2nd Continental Regiment, was authorized on 22 May 1775, organized 1–8 June 1775, and adopted into the Continental Army on 14 June 1775, as the third of three regiments raised by the state of New Hampshire during the American Revolution. The enlistment dates for officers and rank and file soldiers extended to 23 April 1775, based on their response to the alarm for the Battles of Lexington and Concord.

The regiment saw action at the Battle of Bunker Hill, the Battles of Saratoga, and the Battle of Newtown. In addition, the 3rd participated in or was present at the Siege of Boston, the Invasion of Canada, Valley Forge, and Sullivan's Expedition.

The 3rd Regiment was ordered disbanded on 1 January 1781, based on Congress prescribing a new arrangement for the Continental Army on 3 October 1780, that dictated there be just two regiments from New Hampshire, rather than three. Washington's general orders of 1 November 1780, conveyed this arrangement to the army. The officers of the three New Hampshire regiments met and agreed on who would continue to serve and who would agreeably retire based on this new arrangement; this resulted in several officers from the 3rd Regiment continuing service by moving to the 1st or 2nd regiments.

== 3rd Regiment 1775-1776 ==
Its first commander was Colonel James Reed. Companies were initially commanded by:

Captains

- Captain Josiah Crosby (1775 only)
- Captain Jacob Hinds
- Captain Hezekiah Hutchins (1775 only)
- Captain Benjamin Mann
- Captain John Marcy (1775 only)
- Captain Robert Oliver (1776 only)
- Captain David Place (1776 only)
- Captain Levi Spaulding
- Captain Philip Thomas (1775 only)
- Captain Ezra Town (1776 only)
- Captain William Walker (1775 only)
- Captain James Wilkinson (1776 only)
- Captain Jonathan Witcomb (1775 only)

Under Reed, the regiment saw action on 17 June 1775, at the Battle of Bunker Hill, which is more properly known as the Battle of Breeds Hill. There they were on the field at two locations. The bulk of the regiment was at the rail fence positioned between John Stark's 1st New Hampshire Regiment which extended on the fence to the Mystic River and Thomas Knowlton's company of Connecticut militia. One company, under Josiah Crosby of Wilton, New Hampshire, was detached into Charlestown to snipe at the British Marines as they advanced on the redoubt where the bulk of the American forces were deployed.

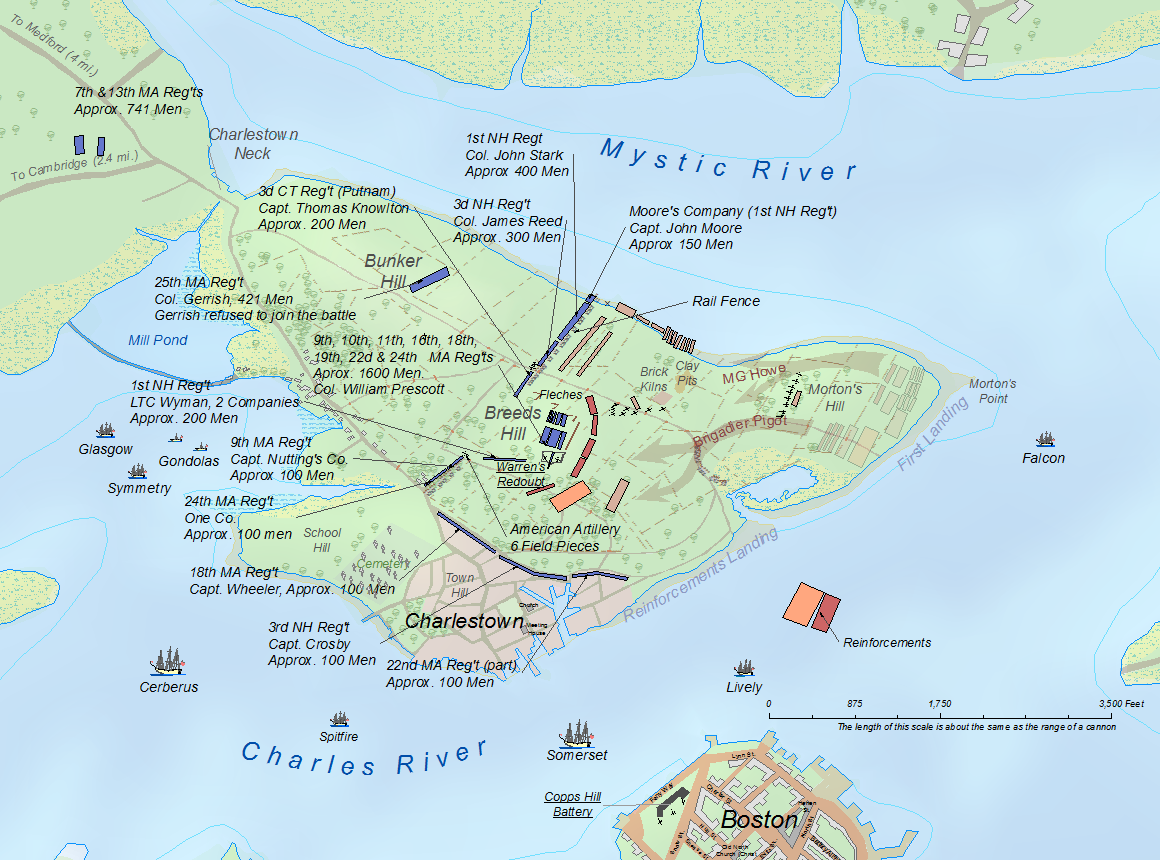
Array of American forces for the Battle of Breeds Hill

Crosby's company's actions (along with one other company) resulted in the British ships on the Charles River loading their cannon with hot grapeshot and burning Charlestown. The battle occurred in three phases, and the 3rd Regiment participated in the first two, which resulted in the decisive defeat of the right wing of the British Army under Major General William Howe. However, the New Hampshire regiments were nearly out of ammunition and could only pull back to Bunker Hill to watch the final phase of the battle play out and then cover the retreat of the Massachusetts soldiers as they escaped the redoubt after it had been finally overrun.

On 1 Jan, 1776, the 3rd Regiment was redesignated as the 2d Continental Regiment and assigned to Sullivan's Brigade. On 27 April 1776, the regiment was assigned to the Canadian Department and was sent to Canada via New York City and then Albany via the Hudson River under Major General John Sullivan during the Invasion of Canada campaign. As the regiment arrived in Canada they suffered through a smallpox epidemic. They made it as far as Montreal where they were from June 12–17 and are shown there on Major Alexander Scammell's Return of the Continental Forces in Canada. The return of Reeds Regiment, dated 21 April 1776, showed 518 officers, staff, and rank and file, and then on General Horatio Gates' return, dated 24 August 1775, there were only 409 men in the regiment, an unfortunately typical loss for regiments in the Canadian Department. The 3rd Regiment returned to Fort Ticonderoga on 16 July 1776, and were there until November 1776.

The 3rd Regiment spent the late summer and fall of 1776 at Fort Ticonderoga. Reed's health was failing, and in November the state sent representatives who with the help of John Stark secured the re-enlistment of many New Hampshire officers and soldiers and re-formed the 1st and 2nd New Hampshire Regiments with those men, which included many from the 3rd Regiment. It is because of this that the 3rd Regiment is usually given credit for participating in the Battle of Trenton and the Battle of Princeton, though in reality these men had re-enlisted or had been reorganized into these new 1st and 2nd New Hampshire Regiments. The 1st New Hampshire Regiment was also known as the 5th Regiment of Foot and was commanded by John Stark, and the 2nd New Hampshire Regiment was also known as the 8th Regiment of Foot and was commanded by Enoch Poor. They left Fort Ticonderoga to join George Washington on November 16, 1776.

In November 1776, what remained of the 3rd Regiment was not much more than a corps of invalids and men who had not re-enlisted and whose enlistments would expire by the end of the year—about 250 in all. Those who did re-enlist in November were incorporated into the 1st and 2nd Regiments. The main army at Fort Ticonderoga marched south to join Washington on 16 and 17 November 1776; the 3rd left Fort Ticonderoga two days later for Fort George, at the southern end of Lake George, where they were assigned until relieved by a New Hampshire militia call-up at the end of December when the majority of the men's enlistments ran out. In December 1776, Col. Alexander Scammell was commissioned to command the 3rd Regiment. on 11 December 1776. Some of the company commanders had been commissioned as of November 8, 1776, and were already in New Hampshire recruiting, and several more captains were added by March 1777 to complete the regiment and recruiting. The result was a new 3rd Regiment for 1777 with an experienced officer corps, but with newly recruited rank and file soldiers, some of whom had had experience in the Continental Army during the Siege of Boston in 1775.

== 3rd Regiment 1777-1781 ==
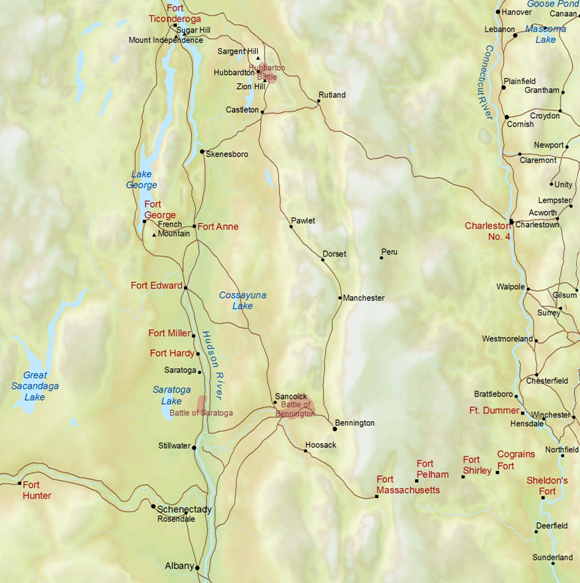
Area of operations for the American and British armies, June–October 1777

By 15 June 1777, the 3rd Regiment under Colonel Alexander Scammell was completed and present for duty at Fort Ticonderoga. The companies of the 3rd Regiment were commanded as follows:

- 1st Company: Captain James Gray
- 2nd Company: Captain Zachariah Beal
- 3rd Company: Captain Michael Mcclary
- 4th Company: Captain Daniel Livermore
- 5th Company: Captain Richard Weare
- 6th Company: Captain Benjamin Stone
- 7th Company: Captain Isaac Frye
- 8th Company: Captain William Ellis

The 3rd Regiment did not stay long at Fort Ticonderoga; the fort's commander, Arthur St. Clair, was forced to abandon the fort because British commander John Burgoyne's forces had taken control of nearby Mount Defiance, making it possible to easily cannonade Fort Ticonderoga. Thus, late on July 5, 1777, orders to leave Fort Ticonderoga were given, and by early morning on 6 July 1777 the 3rd Regiment was marching toward Hubbardton with the main portion of the American army under St. Clair's command. By 8 July 1777 they had reached Fort Edward, New York, and began a campaign of damming streams and felling trees to make the countryside as impassable as possible for the invading British Army. On 28 July 1777, the American Army moved to Fort Miller, then on 10 August 1777 to Stillwater, and on 18 August 1777 to Van Schaick Island at the confluence of the Mohawk and Hudson rivers. The American Army, now swelled by post-harvest militia, then began moving north, arriving at Bemis Heights to camp on 8 September 1777. Most of the summer was spent without proper camp and supplies such as tents, given the hasty retreat from Fort Ticonderoga.

Under Scammell the 3rd regiment saw heated action at the Battles of Saratoga, as evidenced by the loss of several officers and many men. It is remarkable, given the positioning of the 3rd Regiment on the battlefield at Freeman's Farm, that such an inexperienced unit was able to hold the middle of the field. The 3rd was also on the field, in the thick of the battle as part of Enoch Poor's brigade in the Battle of Bemis Heights.

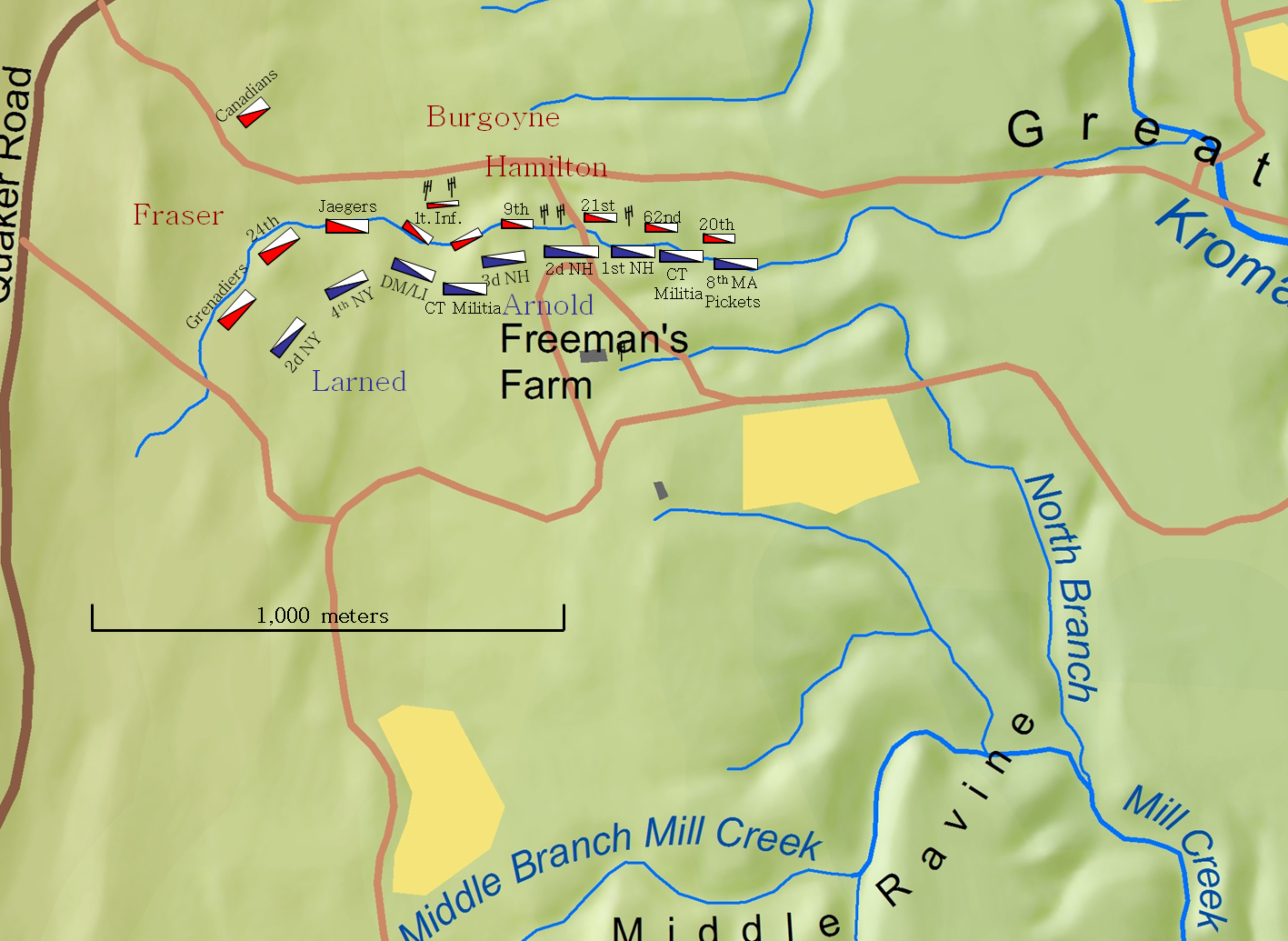
Deployment of units at the Battle of Freeman's Farm, 19 September 1777

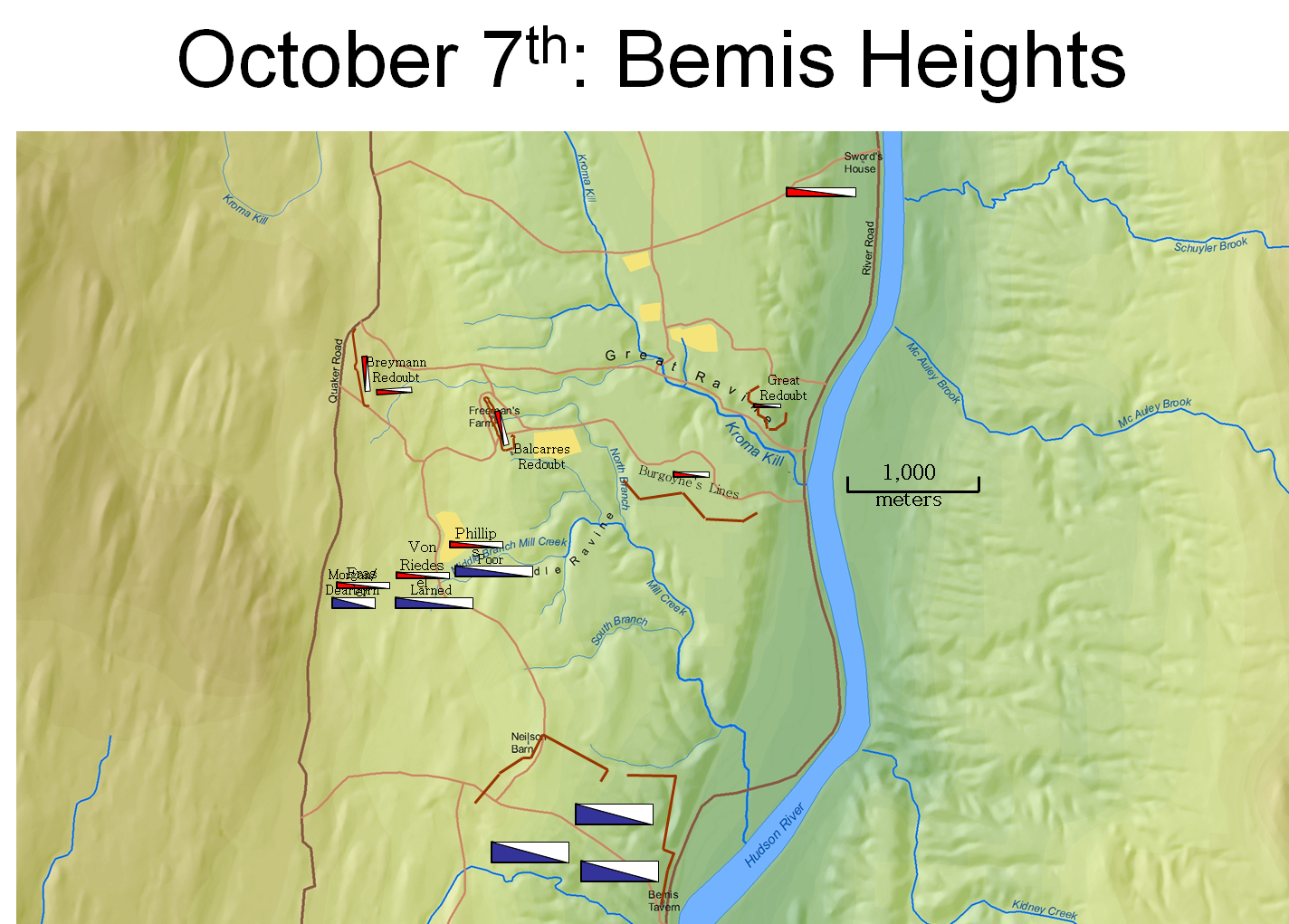
Deployment of units on the field at the outset of the Battle of Bemis Heights

Just two days after the battle, the regiment marched for Valley Forge, where they suffered through the winter. At Valley Forge, Colonel Scammell was chosen to join Washington's inner circle as the Army Adjutant General. The de facto command of the 3rd Regiment fell to Lieutenant-Colonel Henry Dearborn. Under Dearborn the 3rd regiment was at the Battle of Monmouth, where some of its most soldierly men participated. The 3rd then wintered near Danbury, Connecticut. In 1779 the 3rd Regiment was assigned to the Sullivan Expedition, and saw heated action at the Battle of Newtown, again evidenced by the toll shown in their muster rolls. In 1780 the 3rd Regiment was garrisoned at West Point.

On 1 Jan 1781, the 3rd New Hampshire Regiment was disbanded, based on the Commander in Chief's general orders of 1 Nov, 1780. The 1st and 2nd regiments were reorganized, incorporating all of the officers and rank and file from the 3rd Regiment who had time remaining on their enlistments. Alexander Scammell resigned the post of Adjutant General in 1781 and returned to command the 1st Regiment. Scammell was then given the honor of commanding a detachment of light infantry that also served as the vanguard of the American army that marched south to Yorktown in 1781.

== Bibliography ==
- "Continental Congress, October 3, 1780, Resolutions on Army Strength". Library of Congress. 1780.
- Force, Peter (1837). American Archives Series 5, Vol 3. Washington, D.C.: M. St. Clair Clarke and Peter Force under authority of an act of Congress, passed on the second of March, 1833.
- Force, Peter (1837). American Archives Series 4, Vol 4. Washington, D.C.: M. St. Clair Clarke and Peter Force under authority of an act of Congress, passed on the second of March, 1833.
- Frothingham, Richard (1890). The Battle of Bunker Hill. Boston: Little, Brown, and Company.
- Hammond, Isaac (1886). Rolls of the Soldiers in the Revolutionary War. Concord, NH: State of New Hampshire, Parson B. Cogswell, State Printer.
- Potter, C.E. (1866). The Military History of The state of New Hampshire, From its Settlement, in 1623, to the Rebellion, in 1861: Comprising and account of the Stirring Events Connected Therewith; Biographical Notices of Many of the Officers Distinguished Therein: and Notes Explanatory of the Text. Concord, NH: McFarland & Janks.
- Wright, Robert K. (1989). The Continental Army. Washington, D.C.: Center of Military History United States Army. ISBN 0160019311.
- George, Washington (1778). "George Washington, January 13, 1778, General Orders". Library of Congress.
- George, Washington (1780). "George Washington, November 1, 1780, General Orders". Library of Congress.
- George, Washington (1781). "George Washington, May 17, 1781, General Orders". Library of Congress.
