= Capture of Fort William and Mary =

Battle during the American Revolutionary War on December 14, 1774

- Part of the American Revolutionary War
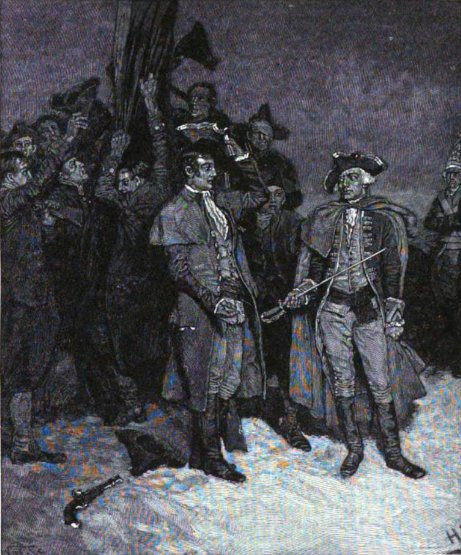
- Surrender of Fort William and Mary by Howard Pyle
Date	December 14, 1774
Location	New Castle, New Hampshire 43°04′16.75″N 70°42′36.74″W
Result	Gunpowder and other military supplies appropriated

Belligerents
New Hampshire Patriots	Great Britain

Commanders and leaders
John Langdon; John Sullivan; Alexander Scammell	John Cochran (surrendered)

Strength
300+ Militiamen	6

Casualties and losses
None	All soldiers captured

The capture of Fort William and Mary took place in Portsmouth, New Hampshire on December 14, 1774, when local Patriots led by John Langdon stormed Fort William and Mary guarding the mouth of the busy seaport. They overcame a six-man caretaker detachment and seized the garrison's powder, which was distributed through several towns in the colony for potential use in the looming conflict with Great Britain. On December 15, 1774, patriots led by John Sullivan again raided the fort, this time seizing numerous cannons, later used in the pivotal Battle of Bunker Hill.

The incident is significant as one of the first overt acts of the American Revolutionary War and the only battle to take place in the state of New Hampshire.

== Background ==
As tensions increased before the American Revolutionary War, the North ministry became concerned that the profusion of arms in New England would lead to bloodshed. On October 19, 1774, King George III issued a confidential Order in Council forbidding the export of arms and powder to America. Word of the order reached operatives in New England's patriot movement.

The port at Boston had been closed in punishment for the Boston Tea Party, and the Portsmouth Committee of Correspondence kept in close contact with friends of liberty in Boston. Tensions in Massachusetts nearly erupted into violence in the fall of 1774 when 4th Regiment of Foot removed gunpowder stores during the so-called Powder Alarm. Upon learning of the Order in Council, patriots feared that the British would make another attempt to take control of powder stores. Patriots in Rhode Island moved munitions from the fort at Newport inland for safekeeping without incident. In Massachusetts, rumors flew that troops from Boston were headed to reinforce Fort William and Mary and seize its powder and arms. On December 13, 1774, four months before his more famous ride in Massachusetts, Paul Revere rode to Portsmouth to sound the alarm. Once he arrived in Portsmouth, Revere met with Samuel Cutts, a local merchant, and together they worked with local Patriots on a plan for the fort.

== Raid ==
On the morning of December 14, Patriots from the town of New Castle unsuccessfully attempted to take the gunpowder at Fort William and Mary by trickery. Meanwhile, John Langdon made his way through Portsmouth with a drummer, collecting a crowd to descend on the fort. Several hundred men responded to his call, setting out for the Castle by way of the Piscataqua River. Only one provincial officer, Captain John Cochran, and five provincial soldiers were stationed at Fort William and Mary. Despite the odds against them, they refused to capitulate to Patriot demands. When Langdon's men rushed the fort, the defenders opened fire with three cannons and a volley of musket shot. Patriots stormed the walls and Cochran's men engaged in hand-to-hand fighting before being subdued by an overwhelming number of raiders. Langdon's volunteers not only broke open the powder house and absconded with about 100 barrels of gunpowder but, to three cheers, hauled down the fort's British flag and stomped upon it. Several injuries but no deaths occurred in the engagement, and Cochran and his men were released after about an hour and a half of confinement.

The next day, additional rebel forces arrived in Portsmouth from across the colony, as well as from Maine. Led by John Sullivan, who was accompanied by Major Alexander Scammell, the rebels returned to the fort late on the night of December 15. The post was overrun without gunfire and muskets, military supplies and 16 cannons marked as the property of the King were removed. British authorities declared the raids—for which Sullivan later received a stipend from the Continental Congress—high treason.

== Aftermath ==
In response to a call for aid from Boston by Governor John Wentworth, the armed hydrographic survey sloop HMS Canceaux arrived to keep the peace in New Hampshire on December 17, followed by the 20-gun post ship HMS Scarborough on December 19, with several marines aboard. The Governor and his family were driven from their home in Portsmouth in the summer of 1775 and forced to take refuge in the fort, guarded by the two warships. Britain finally gave up on the colony of New Hampshire in order to focus attention on the military situation in Massachusetts and abandoned the fort, removing its remaining equipment to Boston along with Wentworth.

The supplies captured by Patriots in December 1774 were later used by New Hampshire forces during the siege of Boston and Battle of Bunker Hill. Conversely, supplies (including numerous cannon) left in the fort by Patriots following the raids were subsequently used by British forces. After the British abandoned the fort, the Patriots probably renamed it Fort Hancock. The plaque currently on the fort is dedicated "In commemoration of the first victory of the American Revolution. The capture, on this site of Fort William and Mary, 14–15 December 1774."

== Bibliography ==
- Roberts, Robert B. (1988). Encyclopedia of Historic Forts: The Military, Pioneer, and Trading Posts of the United States. New York: Macmillan. ISBN 0-02-926880-X.
