= Jean François Hamtramck =

Canadian-American military officer (1756–1803)

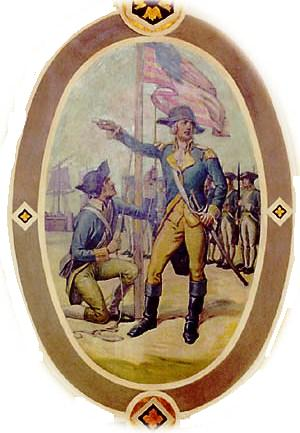
- Colonel Hamtramck taking possession of Fort Lernoult for the United States in 1796.
- Born: Jean-François Hamtramck; 1756; Montreal, New France
- Died: 11 April 1803 (aged 46–47); Detroit, Indiana Territory, United States (now Detroit, Michigan)
- Burial place: Hamtramck, Michigan, US
- Other name: John Francis Hamtramck
- Spouse: Marie Josèphe Edeline
- Children: John F. Hamtramck Jr.
- Military career
- Allegiance: United States
- Branch: Continental Army; Legion of the United States; United States Army
- Service years: 1776–1783; 1785–1803
- Rank: Colonel
- Unit: 1st Infantry Regiment
- Commands: 1st Infantry Regiment
- Conflicts: American Revolutionary War; Invasion of Quebec (1775); Battle of the Cedars; Battle of Fort Montgomery; Sullivan Expedition; Battle of Newtown; Battle of Yorktown; Northwest Indian War; Harmar Campaign; St. Clair's defeat; Battle of Fallen Timbers

Jean-François Hamtramck (or John Francis Hamtramck; 1756 – 11 April 1803) was a Canadian-born Continental Army officer during the American Revolutionary War and the Northwest Indian War. In the Revolution, he participated in the Invasion of Quebec, the Sullivan Expedition, and the Siege of Yorktown. In the history of United States expansion into the Northwest Territory, Hamtramck is connected to 18th century forts at modern Midwest cities such as Steubenville, Vincennes, Fort Wayne, and Detroit. The city of Hamtramck, Michigan is named for him.

== Life and career ==
Hamtramck was born on 1756, in Montreal, Canada (then part of New France). He was the son of Charles David Hamtramck, a Luxembourg-born barber who had immigrated from Trier, Germany, and Canadian Marie Anne Bertin. Hamtramck was baptized in the Catholic Church in August 1756. By the time the American Revolution came to Canada, he was fluent in French, English, German, and Latin.

=== American Revolution ===
==== Canada ====
When General Montgomery's forces invaded Canada, the 1st Canadian Regiment under James Livingston was formed. Hamtramck, age 19, joined on 15 September 1775 and was appointed as regimental commissary. He worked closely with Livingston to supply the new regiment, and was with them when Fort Chambly was captured.

As the regiment moved into Quebec, Hamtramck remained in Montreal to gather supplies, and was appointed by Montgomery to deputy commissary in the Continental Army. The United States was defeated and Montgomery killed at the Battle of Quebec, however. Hamtramck helped raise 26 new recruits and was appointed as their captain. However, Moses Hazen filled other units with his recruits and reduced Hamtramck to lieutenant, leading 10 French Canadians in a New Hampshire regiment under Colonel Timothy Bedel.

In this regiment, Hamtramck participated in the Battle of the Cedars. On 19 May 1776, Hamtramck was captured after Lieutenant Isaac Butterfield surrendered to British Captain George Forster. Iroquois warriors with Forster entered the barracks and killed three men, then stole the belongings of the rest. Captain Forster considered the French Canadians to be traitors and ordered them put in irons. Hamtramck protested that he be treated as an officer. Forster released Hamtramck from his shackles, but refused to return his clothing or release the enlisted men. After capturing more prisoners the next day, Forster had them held on the Island of Montreal. In early June, however, Forster was threatened by American forces under Benedict Arnold, and he marched his company and prisoners to Lake St. Lawrence. Finding no room for the prisoners on the boats there, Forster abandoned them on the shore. They soon broke free from their shackles, and Hamtramck led his unclothed men on a 4 day trek to Montreal, arriving on 8 June, as Arnold was evacuating. Hamtramck located Colonel Hazen, who dismissed the French Canadians to return to their homes.

Hamtramck was warned that he would be considered a traitor if captured, so he travelled to the United States with the defeated army. In July 1776, he travelled to Philadelphia to testify before a Congressional committee investigating the losses in Canada. Hamtramck submitted a four page letter describing his experience, in French, to Congress. On 10 August, Congress passed a resolution that both granted "John Hamptrenk" $350 for his services in Canada and recognized his rank as Captain.

==== United States ====
===== New York =====
Captain Hamtramck settled briefly with other French Canadian refugees in Esopus, New York. When the new 5th New York Regiment was created under Colonel Lewis DuBois, Hamtramck appealed for one of the open company commands. He also received the endorsements of Colonel Livingston and Colonel Peter Gansevoort, among others. On 17 March 1777, the New Nork Committee of Arrangements gave him command of 7th Company, 5th New York Regiment, dated from 21 November 1776. He reported to Fort Montgomery, where Colonel Hazen found him and charged "Lieut. John Hamtramck" of desertion in the Canadian campaign. Hamtramck demanded a court-martial. The charges were reviewed by General Horatio Gates, who found so many inconsistencies in Hazen's charges that he dismissed them and ordered Hamtramck to report to Colonel Dubois.

Hamtramck reported again to Fort Montgomery, then under the command of General George Clinton. The enlisted stationed at Fort Montgomery challenged him as a young, French speaking officer, but he quickly earned a reputation as a strict disciplinarian, which earned him the respect of General (soon Governor) Clinton. That October, he escaped from Fort Montgomery when it was overrun by the British, swinging a broken musket to clear his path. Half the regiment had been captured, however, leaving Hamtramck again without a unit. He found Colonel Dubois and travelled with other escapees to warn Governor Clinton. That November, following British General Burgoyne's surrender, Hamtramck worked to reorganize and supply 7th Company at New Windsor.

In March 1778, Hamtramck was called as a witness in the courts-martial investigations of Generals Putnam and Clinton. That Spring, the regiment was ordered to White Plains. Although Hamtramck remained with his company, he was too ill to report for duty until September. That Winter he distributed a portion of his company supplies to aid survivors of the Cherry Valley massacre.

In 1779, Hamtramck led his depleted company in the Sullivan Expedition. On 29 August, Hamtramck fought in the Battle of Newtown, charging with the 5th New York Regiment to relieve Colonel George Reid's 2nd New Hampshire Regiment. That Winter, Hamtramck encamped at Morristown with the rest of the Continental Army. In February 1780, he signed a petition with 65 New York officers, regarding the depreciation of currency. It asked that either their pay be increased, or their resignations accepted. Washington acknowledged their situation but refused to accept their resignations. By May, Hamtramck was the senior officer in the 5th New York Regiment, which had only 10 officers remaining. They petitioned Congress to keep the Regiment together.

In response to movements by Wilhelm von Knyphausen, the New York Brigade under General James Clinton marched North to defend the Hudson Valley. The 5th New York Regiment, part of the brigade, established their defense in the area surrounding Fonda, New York. In late June they regiments consolidated at West Point, where the 5th Regiment received a new commander, Lieutenant-Colonel Marinus Willett. At the end of July, the regiment moved to Peekskill, New York, where they were reorganized into a light infantry regiment in a new Division under command of General Lafayette. In this new role they marched the rest of the Summer throughout New York and New Jersey, always with bayonets fixed. In October, the regiment was sent to reinforce West Point again; by this time General Arnold's treason had been discovered.

The New York Brigade was consolidated into two regiments. Colonel Philip Van Cortlandt was given command of the 2nd New York Regiment and selected to keep Captain Hamtramck while excess officers were dismissed. In February 1781, a woodcutting party from Hamtramck's company was attacked by a scouting party under Joseph Brant outside Fort Schuyler, killing Private William Moffet and capturing the others.

That May, Fort Schuyler caught fire, destroying the barracks and most of the fort. Hamtramck was appointed to investigate the fire, No sign of arson was found, but the fort had to be abandoned, so the regiment regarrisoned at Fort Herkimer.

===== Yorktown and the End of the War =====
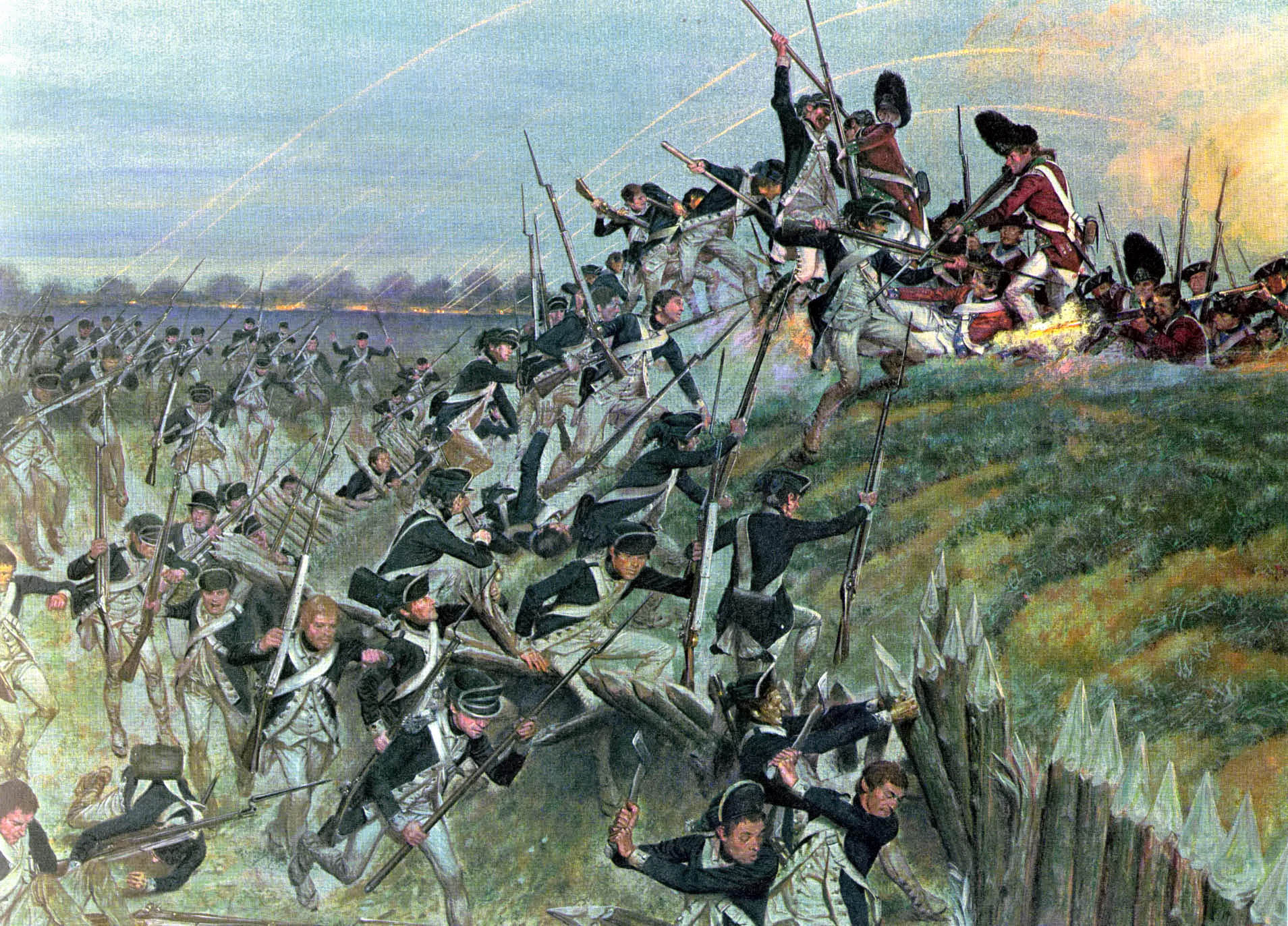
Storming of Redoubt #10

That July, Hamtramck's company was marched to Dobbs Ferry, New York and incorporated into a light infantry battalion commanded by Lieutenant Colonel Alexander Hamilton. They were marched to the Siege of Yorktown, where Hamtramck's company was the first to occupy an American trench parallel to the British defenses. Under Major Nicholas Fish, Hamtramck led his company in Hamilton's assault on Redoubt 10. That November, Hamtramck's company returned North, escorting prisoners from Yorktown. They wintered at Pompton, New Jersey, unaware that for them, the war was effectively over.

In order to alleviate boredom that Winter, Hamtramck submitted a plan to capture a nearby British post on Bergen Neck. The plan made it all the way to General Washington, who wrote to Hamtramck, disapproving the plan but offering his compliments. Washington and his wife visited the encamped Soldiers that March. General von Steuben inspected the battalion in April and was delighted with their performance.

That Autumn 1782, Hamtramck's company was at full strength, and ordered to the Peekskills to establish a screen against possible British movements. They spent that Winter at New Windsor, New York. He completed his final muster and dismissed his company on 21 May 1783. Without a home in the United States, Hamtramck remained at New Windsor, and unsuccessfully petitioned to remain in the Army. Hamtramck served until 3 June 1783. He was brevet promoted to major at the time of his discharge. That same year, he was among the original members of the New York State Society of the Cincinnati.

Hamtramck petitioned Thomas Mifflin, then the president of Congress, for a position in the newly suggested "Peace Establishment", since he could not return to his home in Canada. His name was among the officers recommended by Washington for this force.

=== Northwest Indian War ===
==== First American Regiment ====
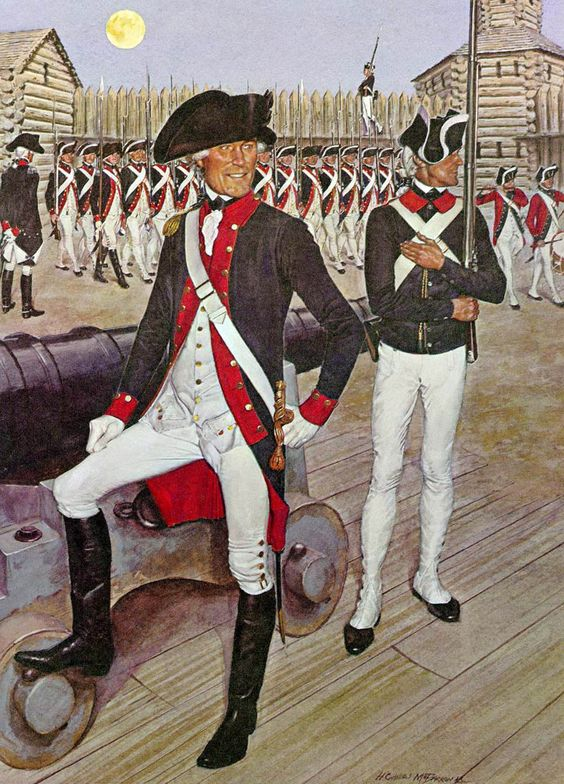
Uniform of the First American Regiment.

On 12 April 1785, with recommendations from three New York generals as well as George Washington, Hamtramck was again appointed as a Captain. This time he served in the First American Regiment, the only standing army remaining from the Continental Army of the American Revolution. In 1786, he was sent from Fort Pitt in command of 160 Soldiers to protect surveyors and remove illegal settlers at Mingo Bottom. That October, he was promoted to major. Hamtramck had Fort Steuben constructed here to aid in the dual mission, completing the fort in early 1787. He had each of the three companies under his command construct one blockhouse in a competition where the first to complete construction would be issued six gallons of whiskey, while the last to complete would dig the ditches. The fort later became the site of Steubenville, Ohio. During this period of initial fort building, Hamtramck wrote that the small army depended on "Providence which by the way, can be depended on more than the Contractor".

===== Vincennes =====
In 1787, Hamtramck travelled with the newly promoted General Josiah Harmar to Vincennes in the Illinois Country. The U.S. officers made a treaty with local Native American tribes. Harmar then continued west, leaving Major Hamtramck in command of 95 Soldiers at Fort Patrick Henry. Hamtramck constructed a new fort, which Harmar later wrote and directed to be named Fort Knox, after United States Secretary of War Henry Knox.

In 1788, Hamtramck requested leave to visit New York. Harmar denied his request. In August of that year, about 60 Kentucky militia led by Patrick Brown arrived in Vincennes, seeking revenge against Native Americans. Hamtramck ordered him to return to Kentucky, since peaceful tribes were "under the protection of the United States". Hamtramck reported to Harmar that he was powerless to stop Brown because he had "but nine men fit for duty".

The following year, a detachment of 36 men was attacked near the mouth of the Wabash River, killing 10 and wounding 8. A raiding party led by John Hardin killed a Shawnee party north of Vincennes that same year. The Kentucky raiders paraded their scalp trophies through Vincennes, where Hamtramck lamented that the "provocation" caused "the authority of the United States" to be "so much insulted". He feared that the "this Kentucky affair will end everything" and that Vincennes would pay for their raid.

Due to the lack of U.S. officials, Hamtramck became the de facto government representative in the Vincennes region. His bilingual skills made him effective both with U.S. settlers and the local French speaking residents, with whom Hamtramck was also popular due to his Catholic faith. Hamtramck remained as commander of the fort at Vincennes until 1791. He was successful in negotiating a suspension of hostilities between the Wabash nations and Vincennes. While serving at Vincennes, he met William Wells, an adopted member of the Miami, and informed his family in Kentucky of his residence. This led to a reunion between Wells and his brothers, although he chose to remain with the Miami.

===== 1790 =====
In 1790, Hamtramck was sent a speech by Governor of the Northwest Territory, Arthur St. Clair, which proposed peace. Hamtramck sent copies in French and English to the Wabash nations first by Pierre Gamelin, then by his brother Antoine Gamelin. Blue Jacket responded that the British at Fort Detroit must be consulted, and several Native Americans expressed skepticism that the peace proposal was meant "to take away by degrees" the native lands. Hamtramck reported the rejection to General Harmar, concluding "a war seems inevitable". A delegation of Potawatomi and Miami arrived later in the year. Hamtramck informed them that the governor was no longer in the region to negotiate, and told them to return with all their prisoners if they were sincere.

In August 1790, Hamtramck married Marie Josèphe Edeline, a resident of Vincennes and widow of Nicolas Perrot. They had 3 daughters together. As a reward for his service in the American Revolutionary War, Hamtramck chose bounty lands on the Wabash and Illinois Rivers.

Major Hamtramck was ordered to move that Autumn against Indian villages on the Wabash, Vermilion, and Eel rivers to create a distraction from the main campaign led by General Josiah Harmar. The Hamtramck expedition consisted of his own garrison, with militia from the local French residents and Kentucky. The total force was about 300 men. On 10 October, they arrived at an empty village (Note: It was standard practice in Native American villages of this region to hide their stores and evacuate when a threat attacked, in order to preserve as much of their supplies as possible and rebuild quickly.) near the Vermilion River, but lacked the supplies to continue on to more villages with the full force. In addition, several members of both the militia and the Kentucky force had deserted, and Hamtramck knew they were being tracked by Native American warriors. Anticipating a "severe drubbing" if they continued, Hamtramck returned to Vincennes, losing horses to hostile forces along the way and arriving on 26 October 1790. Hamtramck thought his mission had been a failure, but he later learned later that a force of 600 warriors from the Wabash Confederacy- nearly double the size of his own force- had assembled to fight. Hamtramck considered the Wabash force evidence that his primary mission had been accomplished.

That December, General Von Steuben wrote to Alexander Hamilton, "I still fear for Hamtramck. This war is not over, it is only the Commencement of the Hostilities, so will we never learn to be wise that by force of stupidity?"

===== St. Clair's Defeat =====
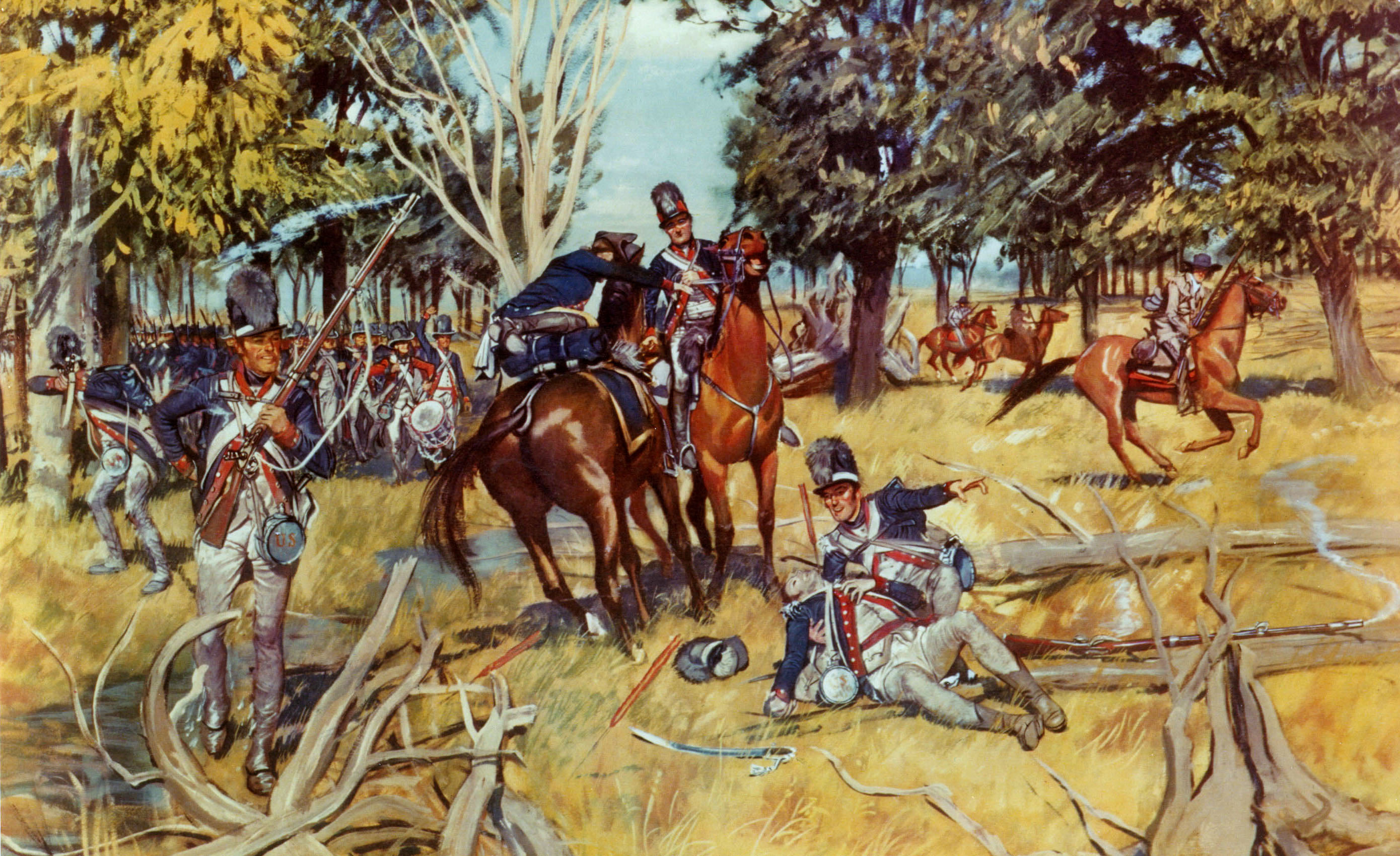
LTC Hamtramck commanded the 1st Sub-legion at the Battle of Fallen Timbers, 20 August 1794.

The following year, Lieutenant Abner Prior relieved Hamtramck as commandant at Vincennes. Hamtramck was ordered to report to Fort Washington with his detachment. They arrived on 15 July 1791, and were sent to Ludlow's Station, 6 miles north of Fort Washington. Major Hamtramck was placed in command of the First American Regiment, with Major David Ziegler as his second in command. They served under General Arthur St. Clair, who was leading a new campaign along the same route Harmar had followed the previous year. Hamtramck selected the site and oversaw the construction of an advance post, named Fort Hamilton. While there, he received a letter from Lieutenant Prior, warning that a large body of Native Americans would oppose St. Clair's march northward.

St. Clair ordered Hamtramck and First American Regiment to the rear in order to protect supply trains and catch deserters. On 4 November 1791, they heard cannon fire in the distance, and Hamtramck led the regiment on a "brisk pace" to catch the main body. They encountered Kentucky militia fleeing from St. Clair's Defeat, who informed them that the entire army had been destroyed. Hamtramck ordered a detachment forward to find the main army, then sent the majority of his command to secure Fort Jefferson, which he presumed would be the next target. The forward detachment made contact with leading elements of St. Clair's retreat and escorted them back to Fort Jefferson, which by nightfall was too crowded for additional refugees. Hamtramck was later criticized by Lieutenant Colonel William Darke, whose son Joseph had died in the battle, for failing to come to the aid of the retreating army, and was relieved of command pending an inquiry and court-martial for the charge of "cowardice and shamefully retreating for fear of the enemy". Hamtramck was acquitted of charges in December, and he returned to Fort Knox.

Hamtramck returned to Vincennes where, in 1792, he negotiated peace with the native nations of the Illinois Country. They had strong ties to the French residents of the region and were therefore less inclined to support the British. That same year, a delegation from Miami and Wea, including William Wells, arrived in Vincennes to claim women and children who had been taken in James Wilkinson's 1791 raid on Battle of Kenapacomaqua.

==== Legion of the United States ====
In February 1793, Hamtramck was relieved at Fort Knox by Captain Thomas Pasteur, and was again ordered to Fort Washington. He was promoted to Lieutenant Colonel Commandant of the 1st Sub-legion in the Legion of the United States, led by General Anthony Wayne to secure the Northwest Territory. Hamtramck was opposite James Wilkinson, now a Brigadier General and second-in-command of the Legion. As the Legion grew and organized, a list of promotions and appointments arrived from Henry Knox, which declined to fill a vacancy by BG Thomas Posey. Hamtramck was incensed, writing to Wayne to express his "mortification of seeing myself unnoticed" since "my Command is one wing of the Army, and the other Commanded by a Brigadier General". He requested a brevet promotion to match James Wilkinson in recognition of "eighteen years devoted to the Service of my Country, and that with irreproachable Conduct". Despite his threat to leave the army, Hamtramck was not promoted.

Hamtramck was placed in command of Fort Jefferson in 1793. That October, as Wayne marched the Legion north towards the fort, they heard musket fire. The Legion formed up and hurried to the fort, thinking it to be under attack. Instead, they found Hamtramck training his soldiers in a mock battle.

At the 1794 Battle of Fallen Timbers in 1794, Hamtramck was given command of the combined Second and Fourth Sub-legions, on the Legion's left wing. The U.S. victory at Fallen Timbers created a schism in the Western Confederacy and led to the Treaty of Greenville, securing most of the modern state of Ohio for United States settlement.

=== Later career ===
Following the Battle of Fallen Timbers, Hamtramck was appointed as the first commandant of Fort Wayne, where he co-owned a large farm with his friend, William Wells. In 1796, he led the garrison to secure Fort Maumee. He was then transferred to Fort Lernoult (later renamed Fort Shelby) and the settlement of Detroit for the United States on 11 July 1796.

In 1798, Hamtramck was given command of the Northwestern military headquarters at Fort Lafayette. At the end of the same year, he was transferred to Fort Adams, Mississippi and given command of the Southwestern Military Department. On 1 April 1801, he was promoted to colonel and sent back to Detroit as part of a reorganization of the Army.

Hamtramck remained in command at Detroit, living in a house on land that is now Gabriel Richard Park near the present bridge to Belle Isle. His 1802 orders detailing 1st Infantry Regiment uniforms was still in effect at the onset of the Lewis and Clark Expedition.

=== Death and burial ===
Colonel Hamtramck died on 11 April 1803 and was buried at Ste. Anne de Detroit Catholic Church. The officers under his command placed a stone to mark his grave, as a "grateful tribute to his merit and his worth". His body was moved in 1817 to the new Saint Anne's, then, in 1869, to Mount Elliott Cemetery. Hamtramck's remains were moved a final time in 1962 to Veterans Park in Hamtramck, Michigan.

== Dates of rank ==
- Commissary, 1st Canadian Regiment - 15 September 1775
- Lieutenant, 2nd Canadian Regiment - 1776 (Congress later recognized him as a Captain during this time)
- Captain, 5th New York Regiment - 21 November 1776
- Captain, 2nd New York Regiment - 1 January 1783
- Discharged - 3 June 1783
- Captain, US Infantry Regiment - 12 April 1785
- Major, US Infantry Regiment - 20 October 1786
- Major, 1st Infantry Regiment - 29 September 1789
- Major, 2nd Sub-legion - 4 September 1792
- Lieutenant Colonel Commandant, 1st Sub-legion - 18 February 1793
- Lieutenant Colonel Commandant, 1st Infantry - 1 November 1796
- Colonel, 1st Infantry - 1 April 1802

== Legacy ==
In 1827, one of the four townships in Wayne County, Michigan was named for him, a portion of which later became the city of Hamtramck.

Hamtramck's son, John Francis Hamtramck, attended the United States Military Academy under recommendation from William Henry Harrison. He also achieved the rank of Colonel and served in the Mexican–American War.

In the 1962, Col. Hamtramck's remains were moved to Hamtramck, Michigan, the city formed from the township named in his honor. His grave site is incorporated into the Veterans Memorial at the entrance to Veterans Memorial Park, which is the main city park in Hamtramck, Michigan. This monument and the Beth Olem Jewish cemetery are the only remaining grave sites in the City of Hamtramck. The grave site is a Michigan historical marker site. The grave marker text reads:

Colonel John Francis Hamtramck, Esq.

The First United States Regiment of Infantry and Commandant of Detroit and its dependencies.
He departed this life on the 11th of April 1803 aged 48 years, 7 months and 28 days.
True patriotism and zealous attachment to national liberty joined to a laudable ambition led him into military service at an early period of his life.
He was a soldier even before he was a man. He was an active participant in all the dangers, difficulties and honors of the revolutionary war, and his heroism and uniform good conduct procured him the attention and personal thanks of the immortal Washington.
The United States in him have lost a valuable officer and a good citizen, and society a useful and pleasant member.
To his family his loss is incalculable, and his friends never forget the memory of Hamtramck. This humble monument is placed over his remains by the officers who had the honor to serve under his command- A small but grateful tribute to his merit and his worth.

This inscription was restored by the Catholic Study Club of Detroit, Michigan May 30th 1928.

== See also ==
- John Francis Hamtramck Claiborne (namesake)

== Notes ==
=== References ===
- Bald, F. Clever (1948). "Colonel John Francis Hamtramck". Indiana Magazine of History. 44 (4). Indiana University Press: 335–354. JSTOR 27787713.
- Barnhart, John D.; Riker, Dorothy L (1971). Indiana to 1816. The Colonial Period. Indiana Historical Society. ISBN 0-87195-109-6.
- Calloway, Colin G. (2014). The Victory with No Name: The Native American Defeat of the First American Army. New York: Oxford University Press. ISBN 978-0-19-938799-1.
- Calloway, Colin G. (2018). The Indian World of George Washington. New York: Oxford University Press. ISBN 9780190652166. LCCN 2017028686.
- Catlin, George B. (1930). "Colonel John Francis Hamtramck". Indiana Magazine of History. 26 (3): 237–252. JSTOR 27786450.
- Cayton, Andrew R. L. (1996). Frontier Indiana. Bloomington, Indiana: Indiana University Press. ISBN 978-0-253-33048-2.
- Griffin, Martin (1898). "Colonel John Francis Hamtramck. A Catholic Soldier of the Revolution". The American Catholic Historical Researches. 15 (2): 114–124. JSTOR 44377911.
- Logusz, Michael O. (2016). With Musket & Tomahawk. Volume III. The West Point-Hudson Valley Campaign in the Wilderness War of 1777. New York: Carrel Books. ISBN 978-1-63144-040-3.
- Otten, William L. (1997). Colonel J.F. Hamtramck. His Life and Times. Volume One (1756–1783). Austin: Otten Publishing. ISBN 0-9657423-0-X. LCCN 97-91610.
- Otten, William L. (2003). Colonel J.F. Hamtramck. His Life and Times. Volume Two (1783–1791). Austin: Otten Publishing. ISBN 0-9657423-1-8. LCCN 2003096466.
- Lytle, Richard M. (2004). The Soldiers of America's First Army, 1791. Scarecrow Press. ISBN 978-0810850118.
- Poinsatte, Charles (1976). Outpost in the Wilderness: Fort Wayne, 1706–1828. Allen County, Fort Wayne Historical Society.
- Sword, Wiley (1985). President Washington's Indian War: The Struggle for the Old Northwest, 1790–1795. Norman and London: University of Oklahoma Press. ISBN 0-8061-1864-4.
- Thornbrough, Gayle, ed. (1957). Outpost on the Wabash, 1787–1791. Indiana Historical Society.
