= James Reed (soldier) =

New England military figure in the French and Indian War and the American Revolution

- Born: c. 1724; Massachusetts, British America
- Died: February 13, 1807; Fitchburg, Massachusetts, U.S.
- Burial place: Fitchburg, Massachusetts
- Spouse: Abigail Hinds
- Military career
- Service: Continental Army
- Rank: Brigadier general
- Commands: 3rd New Hampshire Regiment
- Conflicts: French and Indian War; Battle of Carillon; Battle of Ticonderoga; American Revolutionary War; Battle of Bunker Hill; Invasion of Quebec

James Reed (born c. 1722–1807) was a military officer in the French and Indian War and the American Revolution, rising to the rank of brigadier general in the latter conflict.

== Biography ==
Reed was born in Lunenburg or Woburn, Province of Massachusetts Bay. In 1742, James married Abigail Hinds, whose father was Hopestill Hinds. Abigail was born 4 March 1723 in Brookfield, Massachusetts, but is said to have been living in New Salem, Massachusetts.

During the French and Indian War, Reed served as an officer in Colonel Brown's Massachusetts Regiment, becoming a lieutenant colonel. He was at Fort Ticonderoga in both 1758 and when it fell in 1759.

He was the original proprietor of Monadnock township no. 4, now Fitzwilliam, New Hampshire.

With news of the Battle of Lexington and Concord, James Reed gathered the local militia and marched to Boston. James Reed was appointed Colonel of the 3rd New Hampshire Regiment and fought together with John Stark's 1st New Hampshire Regiment at the Battle of Bunker Hill. On April 26, 1776, the three New Hampshire regiments of the Continental Army were sent under General John Sullivan to help in the Invasion of Quebec. James Reed only made it as far as Fort Saint-Jean in Quebec, where he contracted smallpox. Apparently having recovered, he fell ill again during the retreat from Canada, shortly after arriving at Crown Point on Lake Champlain, with a malignant fever, which caused him to lose his vision forcing him to retire from military service at the end of 1776. James Reed was promoted to brigadier general in the Continental Army, but never served at that rank because of his failing health.

Reed was admitted as an original member of The Society of the Cincinnati in the state of New Hampshire in 1784.

Reed lived to the age of 83 and died in 1807 in Fitchburg, Massachusetts, where he was buried. He is featured on a New Hampshire historical marker (number 99) along New Hampshire Route 119 at the town square of Fitzwilliam.

== Bibliography ==
- Beebe, Lewis, 1935 Journal of a Physician on the Expedition Against Canada in 1776 The Pennsylvania Magazine Vol LIX, Number Four.
- Carroll, Samuel 1901 A List of The Revolutionary Soldiers of Dublin, N.H. Derby Press of Spahr & Glenn, Columbus, Ohio
- Garfield, James F.D. 1899 (read) 1908 (published) General James Reed Proceedings of the Fitchburg Historical Society and Papers Relating to the History of the Town read by some members. Vol IV pp. 113–124.
- State Builders: An Illustrated Historical and Biographical Record of the State of New Hampshire. State Builders Publishing, Manchester, NH 1903
- Cheshire Historical Society, History Packet No. 9, Multi Era 2 - 3: 1724 to 1807
