= Samuel Cutts =

American merchant and politician

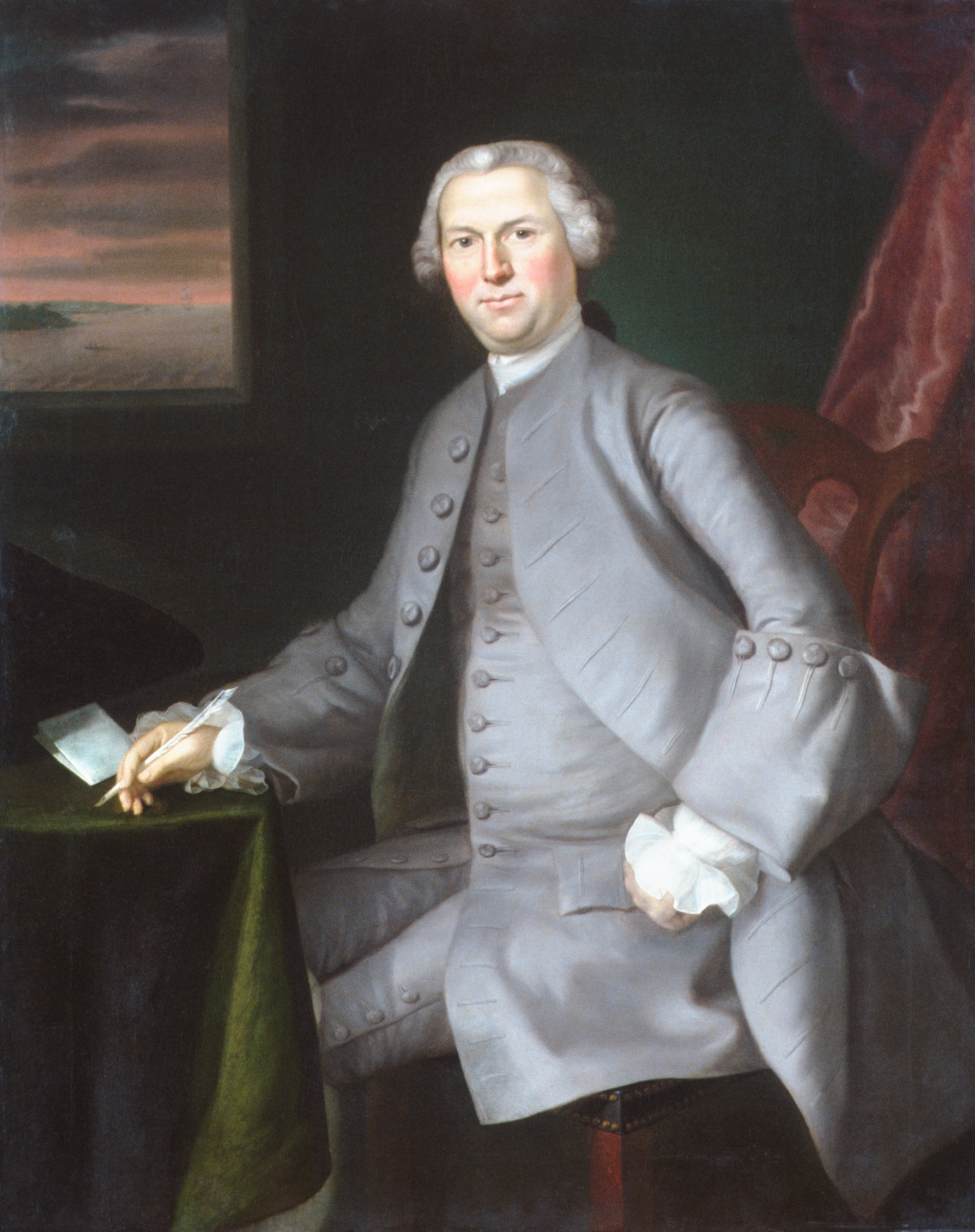
- Born: December 8, 1726; Portsmouth
- Died: May 29, 1801 (aged 74); Portsmouth

Samuel Cutts (December 8, 1726 – May 29, 1801) was an American merchant and politician.

Cutts was the son of Richard and Eunice (Curtis) Cutts of Portsmouth, New Hampshire, where he was born in 1726. His entire life was passed in his native town where he became a prosperous merchant, a representative to the New Hampshire General Court and a member of the New Hampshire Provincial Congress. He was married at Cambridge, Massachusetts, December 8, 1762 to Anne Holyoke (1735–1812). He died at Portsmouth, May 29, 1801.

In 1774, he met with Paul Revere and helped coordinate with local patriots for the raid on Fort William and Mary.
