= Siege of Yorktown order of battle =

Campaign from the American Revolution

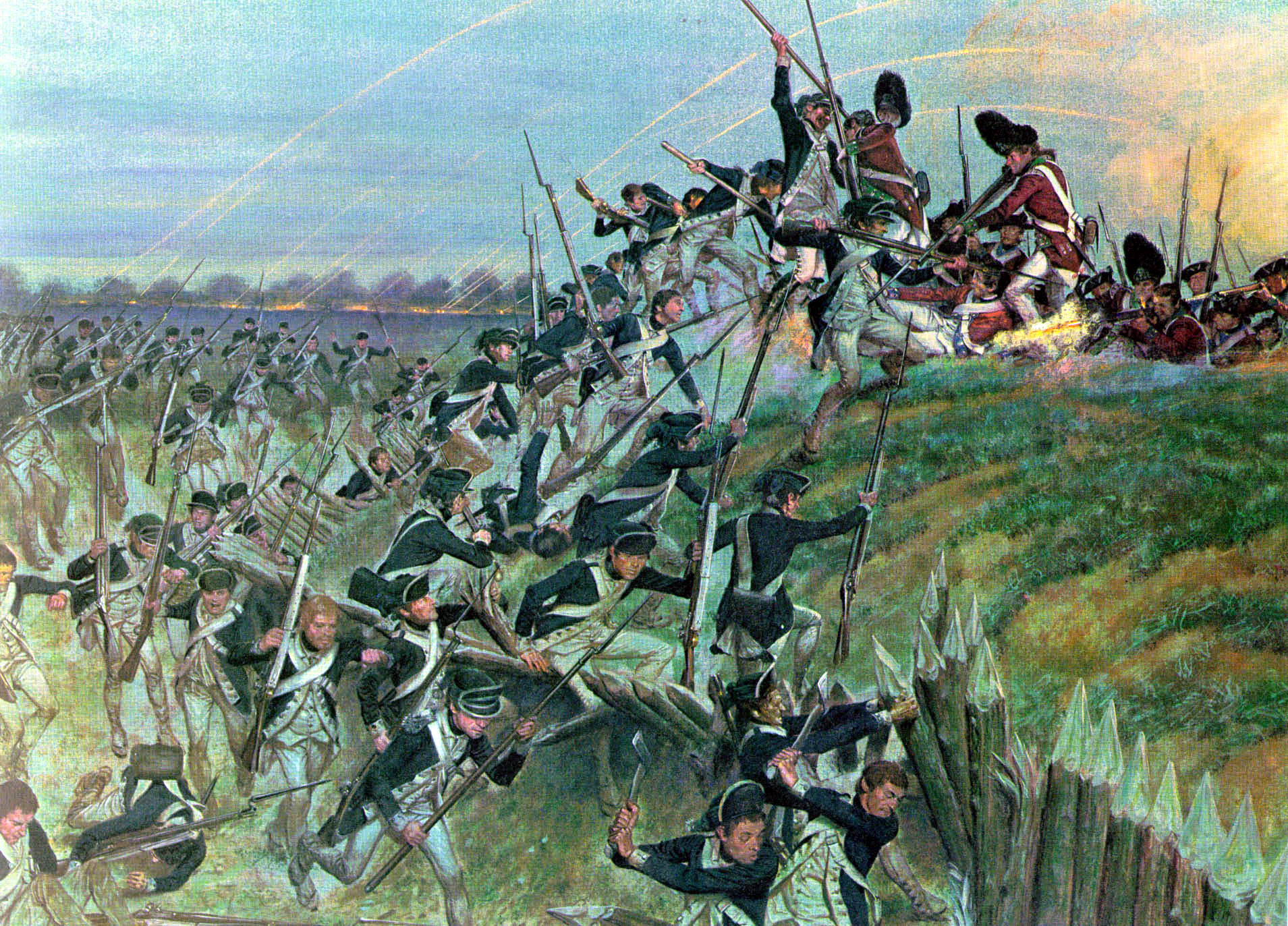
The storming of redoubt #10 at Yorktown

The siege of Yorktown was the culminating act of the Yorktown campaign, a series of military operations occupying much of 1781 during the American Revolutionary War. The siege was a decisive Franco-American victory: after the surrender of British Lt. Gen. Charles, Earl Cornwallis on October 17, the government of Lord North fell, and its replacement entered into peace negotiations that resulted in British recognition of American independence with the 1783 Treaty of Paris.

In the battle The siege involved land forces from the United States, including the Continental Army and state militias, as well as land forces under French and British command. The British forces included a large number of troops from various German principalities of the Holy Roman Empire that were collectively known as Hessians. Since Yorktown, Virginia was specifically selected by Cornwallis for its properties as a deep-water port, both sides had naval support as well: the British forces included some Royal Navy vessels, and the Franco-American allies were supported by a large French fleet, some of whose marines were landed to assist in siege operations. German historians have noted that approximately one third of all the land forces involved were either hired or recruited from German states, or were German immigrants to America; this has led the siege to be known in German historiography as "die Deutsche Schlacht" ("the German battle").

The following units and commanders of the British, American, and French forces fought in the Siege of Yorktown, or provided significant local support.

== British Army ==
The British Army forces present at Yorktown arrived in Virginia in four separate detachments. The first was sent from New York City in December 1780 under the command of Brigadier-General Benedict Arnold. The second was sent from New York in March 1781 under the command of Major-General William Phillips to reinforce Arnold after a Franco-American threat. The third detachment to arrive was that of General Charles Cornwallis, who had been active in the Carolinas and, following the Battle of Guilford Court House on March 15, decided to join forces with Arnold and Phillips. This was contrary to instructions from his superior, Lieutenant-General Sir Henry Clinton, the Commander-in-Chief, North America. He arrived at Petersburg, Virginia in late May to take command of the troops there; Phillips had died of a fever just a week before, and Arnold returned to New York not long after Cornwallis arrived. While at Petersburg, Cornwallis was joined by a fourth detachment from New York that was under the command of the Hessian Colonel August von Voigt.

With this force, numbering about 7,200, Cornwallis first chased after the army of the Marquis de Lafayette, a much smaller force of Continental Army and local militiamen that had provided some resistance to the movements of Phillips and Arnold. Cornwallis was eventually ordered by Clinton to establish a fortified deep-water port at either Yorktown or Portsmouth. Cornwallis chose Yorktown, and began constructing fortifications there and Gloucester Point, just across the York River from Yorktown, in August 1781.

=== British forces ===
Commander: Lt. Gen. Charles, Earl Cornwallis, commanding

- Headquarters
  - Staff
  - Troop from 17th Regiment of (Light) Dragoons, incorporated into British Legion (elements opposite Yorktown in Gloucester)
  - His Majesty's Marine Forces
- Artillery
  - Royal Regiment of Artillery (plus detachments of sailors manning guns from scuttled ships) (167 men all of ranks (from RA)
    - Detachments from No.1 Company, 4th Battalion, RA
    - Detachments from No.2 Co, 4th Btn, RA
    - No.6 Co, 4th Btn, RA
    - Detachments from No.8 Co, 4th Btn, RA
  - Hesse-Hanau Artillery Company
- Brigade of Foot Guards commanded by Brig. Gen. Charles O'Hara
  - 1st Battalion, 1st Regiment of Foot Guards (two companies of grenadiers, as opposed to one)
  - 1st Consolidated Battalion
  - 2nd Consolidated Battalion
- Light Infantry Brigade commanded by Lt. Col. Robert Abercromby
  - 1st Battalion (Light companies from the 4th, 7th, 15th, 17th, 23rd, 27th, 33rd, and 38th Foot)
  - 2nd Battalion (Light companies from the 37th, 43rd, 45th, 49th, 55th, 63rd, and 71st Foot)
  - 82nd Regiment of Foot
- 1st Brigade commanded by Lt. Col. John Yorke
  - 17th Regiment of Foot
  - 23rd Regiment of Foot (Royal Welch Fuzileers)
  - 33rd Regiment of Foot
  - 2nd Battalion, 71st Regiment of Foot (Fraser's Highlanders)
- 2nd Brigade commanded by Lt. Col. Thomas Dundas
  - 43rd Regiment of Foot
  - 76th Regiment of Foot (MacDonald's Highlanders)
  - 80th Regiment of Foot (Royal Edinburgh Volunteers)

=== German contingents ===
- Ansbach-Bayreuth Contingent under Col. August von Voigt
  - 1st Ansbach-Bayreuth Regiment
  - 2nd Ansbach-Bayreuth Regiment
  - Ansbach-Bayreuth Artillery Company
- Hesse-Kassel Contingent under Lt. Col. Matthew von Fuchs
  - Erbprinz Musketeer Regiment
  - von Bose Regiment
  - Jaeger Korps (company)
  - Unknown Artillery Company

=== Loyalists ===
- Queen's Rangers
- British Legion
- North Carolina Volunteers

== American Army ==
The American forces that opposed Cornwallis at Yorktown also arrived in Virginia at different times, since most of the detachments were made in reaction to the British movements. After Arnold was sent to Virginia, General George Washington, the American commander-in-chief, in January 1781 sent the Marquis de Lafayette to Virginia with 900 men. He was to be followed promptly by troops from the Pennsylvania Line under the command of Brigadier General Anthony Wayne, but Wayne did not arrive in Virginia until June. Lafayette's force included a substantial number of Virginia militia, and he shadowed Cornwallis during the movements that ended at Yorktown, with a skirmish at Spencer's Ordinary and a larger battle at Green Spring being their only significant encounters.

The main Continental Army of General Washington was at first stationed outside New York City, which Washington hoped to besiege with the assistance of the French army. However, word from Admiral Paul de Grasse of the French West Indies fleet would sail north to assist in operations on the Chesapeake Bay convinced Washington that action was best taken against Cornwallis's army in Virginia. Accordingly, the American and French armies set out in mid-August for Virginia. Some troops went overland the entire way; others were transported on the Chesapeake by ships of the French Navy. Washington arrived in Lafayette's camp before Yorktown on September 17.

- Commander, General George Washington, commanding
- Headquarters
  - 4th Continental Light Dragoons
  - Armand's Legion
- Artillery under Brigadier General Henry Knox
  - 1st Continental Artillery Regiment (10 company), Lieutenant Colonel Edward Carrington, Captain Whitehead Coleman
  - 2nd Continental Artillery Regiment (9 companies), Colonel John Lamb
  - 4th Continental Artillery Regiment (3 companies), Captains Patrick Duffy, William Ferguson, and James Smith
  - Sappers and Miners (4 companies)
- Light Division, under Major General Marie-Joseph Paul Yves Roch Gilbert du Motier, Marquis de La Fayette
  - 1st Brigade, commanded by Brigadier General Peter Muhlenberg
    - Colonel Joseph Vose's Battalion (8 Massachusetts light infantry companies)
    - Lieutenant Colonel Jean-Joseph Sourbader de Gimat's Battalion (5 Connecticut, 2 Massachusetts, and 1 Rhode Island light infantry companies)
    - Lieutenant Colonel Francis Barber's Battalion (2 New Hampshire, 2 New Jersey, and Canadian Regiment light infantry companies and 3 New Jersey line companies)
  - 2nd Brigade, commanded by Brigadier General Moses Hazen
    - Lieutenant Colonel Alexander Scammell's battalion (3 New Hampshire, 3 Massachusetts, 3 Connecticut light infantry companies, 1 Rhode Island light platoon under Lieutenant Benjamin Sherburne)
    - Lieutenant Colonel Alexander Hamilton's Battalion (2 New York light infantry companies; 2 New York and 2 Connecticut provisional light infantry companies)
    - Hazen's Canadian Regiment
- 2nd Division, commanded by Major General Benjamin Lincoln
  - 1st Brigade, commanded by Brigadier General James Clinton
    - 1st New York Regiment
    - 2nd New York Regiment
  - 2nd Brigade, commanded by Colonel Elias Dayton
    - 1st New Jersey Regiment
    - 2nd New Jersey Regiment
    - Rhode Island Regiment
- 3rd Division, under Major General Baron von Steuben
  - 1st Brigade, commanded by Brigadier General Anthony Wayne
    - 1st Pennsylvania Battalion
    - 2nd Pennsylvania Battalion
  - 2nd Brigade, commanded by Brigadier General Mordecai Gist
    - 3rd Maryland Regiment
    - 4th Maryland Regiment
    - Gaskins's Virginia Battalion - Major John Poulson
- Virginia Militia, commanded by Governor of Virginia, General Thomas Nelson
  - Dabney's Virginia State Regiment - Lieutenant Colonel Charles Dabney
  - Campbell's Riflemen
  - 1st Brigade, commanded by Brigadier General George Weedon
    - Mercer's Virginia Militia Battalion
    - Weedon's Virginia Militia Battalion
  - 2nd Brigade, commanded by Brigadier General Robert Lawson
    - Lawson's Virginia Militia Battalion
  - 3rd Brigade, commanded by Brigadier General Edward Stevens
    - Steven's Virginia Militia Battalion

== French Army ==
French troops at Yorktown came from two separate sources. The larger force (known as the Expédition Particulière), which was under the command of Lieutenant-General Jean-Baptiste Donatien de Vimeur, comte de Rochambeau, landed at Newport, Rhode Island in 1780 and marched overland to join Washington's army outside New York in the summer of 1781. These troops marched with Washington's army from New York to Yorktown. More French troops were transported by boat on the Chesapeake than Americans, due to the French navy's preference for transporting their own soldiers. The second source for French troops was the colony of Saint-Domingue, where de Grasse picked up more than 3,000 soldiers under the command of Major-General Claude-Anne de Rouvroy de Saint Simon before departing for North America. French ground forces were also supplemented by a number of marines provided by de Grasse in support of the siege. French units at the siege of Yorktown included:

- Commander Lt. Gen. Jean-Baptiste Donatien de Vimeur, comte de Rochambeau
- Commander of Artillery, Lt. Col. François Marie d'Aboville
  - Auxonne Regiment (1 battalion)
  - Metz Regiment (4 companies)
  - Grenoble Regiment (1 company)
- Maj. Gen. Charles Gabriel, Baron de Viomenil's Division
  - Bourbonnois Brigade
    - Bourbonnais Regiment (2 battalions)
    - Royal Deux-Ponts Regiment (2 battalions)
- Maj. Gen. Joseph Hyacinthe, Comte de Viomenil's Division
  - Soissonais Brigade
    - Soissonnais Regiment (2 battalions)
    - Saintonge Regiment (2 battalions)
- Maj. Gen. Marquis de St. Simon's Division
  - Agenois Brigade
    - Agenois Regiment (2 battalions)
    - Gatinois Regiment (2 battalions)
- Touraine Brigade
  - Touraine Regiment (2 battalions)
- Brig. Marquis de Choisy's Detachment at Gloucester, Virginia
  - 1st Legion of Foreign Volunteers of the Navy (4 companies)
  - Lauzun's Legion (2 squadrons)
  - Royal Marine Corps

== Sources ==
- Greene, Jerome A. (2005). The Guns of Independence: The Siege of Yorktown, 1781. New York, N.Y.: Savas Beatie. ISBN 1-932714-05-7.
- Morrissey, Brendan (1999), Yorktown 1781: The World Turned Upside Down, Oxford, United Kingdom: Osprey Military. ISBN 1-85532-688-4
- Theodore P. Savas & J. David Dameron, The New American Revolution Handbook, New York and California: Savas Beatie, 2010/2011. ISBN 978-1-932714-93-7.
- Digby Smith & Kevin F. Kiley, An Illustrated Encyclopedia of Uniforms of the American War of Independence 1775-1783, Lorenz Books. ISBN 978-0-7548-1761-1.
- Ministry of Foreign Affairs, Les Combattants Français de la Guerre Américaine 1778–1783, 1903 Paris, France.
