= Alexander Scammell =

American military officer (1747–1781)

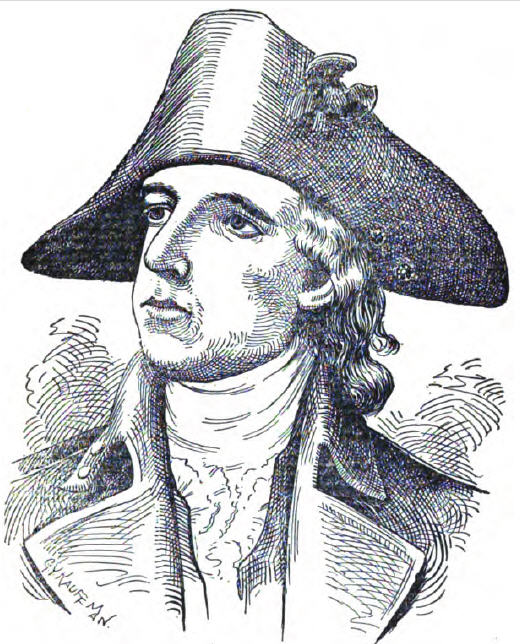
- Born: 22 March 1747; Mendon, Massachusetts, United States
- Died: 6 October 1781 (aged 34); Williamsburg, Virginia, United States
- Education: Harvard College
- Military career
- Allegiance: United Colonies; United States
- Service years: 1776 (United Colonies); 1776–1781 (United States)
- Conflicts: American Revolutionary War; Battle of Trenton; Battle of Princeton; Battle of Freeman's Farm; Battle of Bemis Heights; Siege of Yorktown

Alexander Scammell (March 22, 1747 – October 6, 1781) was an American military officer and attorney who served in the Continental Army during the American Revolutionary War. He was wounded on September 30, 1781, near Yorktown and subsequently died on October 6 in Williamsburg, Virginia, making him, a colonel, the highest ranking American officer killed during the Siege of Yorktown.

== Biography ==
Scammell was born March 22, 1747, in the part of Mendon, Massachusetts, which eventually became Milford, Massachusetts. His father, physician Samuel Leslie Scammell died in 1753 and Alexander and his older brother, Samuel (b. 1739) were placed under the care and guidance of Reverend Amariah Frost. As a young man, Alexander graduated from Harvard College in 1769, and then moved to Plymouth County where he taught school in the towns of Kingston and Plymouth and became a member of the Old Colony Club celebrating the Plymouth landing. In 1772, he moved to Portsmouth where he worked surveying and exploring the lands of the Royal Navy Timber. When not surveying, he kept a school at Berwick, was one of the proprietors of the town of Shapleigh. He also assisted Captain Samuel Holland in making surveys for his Topographical Map of New Hampshire.

Subsequently, in 1773, Scammell began to read law with John Sullivan. Scammell had a high opinion of Sullivan whom he styled, "an excellent instructor and worthy patron". Sullivan was a member of the Congress of 1774 and 1775, and the following year he was appointed a brigadier general by that Congress. Scammell was with Sullivan during the Capture of Fort William and Mary on December 14, 1774.

With the start of the American Revolution, Scammell became a major in the 2nd New Hampshire Regiment, which was in Sullivan's Brigade, and after the Siege of Boston was sent with them to reinforce the Continental Army units in the Invasion of Canada. Sullivan's force returned to Fort Ticonderoga by mid July 1776, and by August Scammell had been assigned as Aide-de-Camp to Sullvan. But in September he was ordered to Assist Col George Reid in New York City and fought at the Battle of Long Island. In October 1776 he was appointed Assistant Adjutant General for Charles Lee's Division. In November 1776, Scammell was promoted to colonel. Then on 11 December 1776 he was given command of the 3rd New Hampshire Regiment. However, as that regiment had not yet been recruited (the company officers spent the early months of 1777 recruiting), Scammell accompanied the 1st and 2nd regiments under Col John Stark south to join Washington's Army. In this capacity, Scammell crossed the Delaware with Washington and took part in the Battle of Trenton and the Battle of Princeton. In the latter, Scammell is recalled to have preceded Washington in rallying the troops who were being beaten badly. Both officers came through unscathed with earned reputations as extraordinary battlefield leaders.

The recruiting of the 3rd NH Regiment was completed in June 1777, and within two weeks of men mustering for the first time at Fort Ticonderoga did Major General Arthur St. Clair order its evacuation. Scammell commanded the regiment at Saratoga, and distinguished himself bravely in the battles of Freeman's Farm and Bemis Heights, and was possibly wounded in the latter battle (In letters to his brother he did not indicate being wounded and that bullets had passed through his clothing and hit the breech of his weapon). At this time, Henry Dearborn, and his light infantry were under his command. Just two days after Burgoyne's surrender the regiment moved to winter quarters at Valley Forge where Scammell was appointed adjutant general of the Continental Army by Gen. George Washington. Scammell served in this capacity through 1780. In October 1780, Scammell was appointed as executioner to Major John André, a duty that weighed heavily on him. The result was a letter of Nov 16, 1780 to Washington requesting permission to resign his post and take command of a regiment of the line.

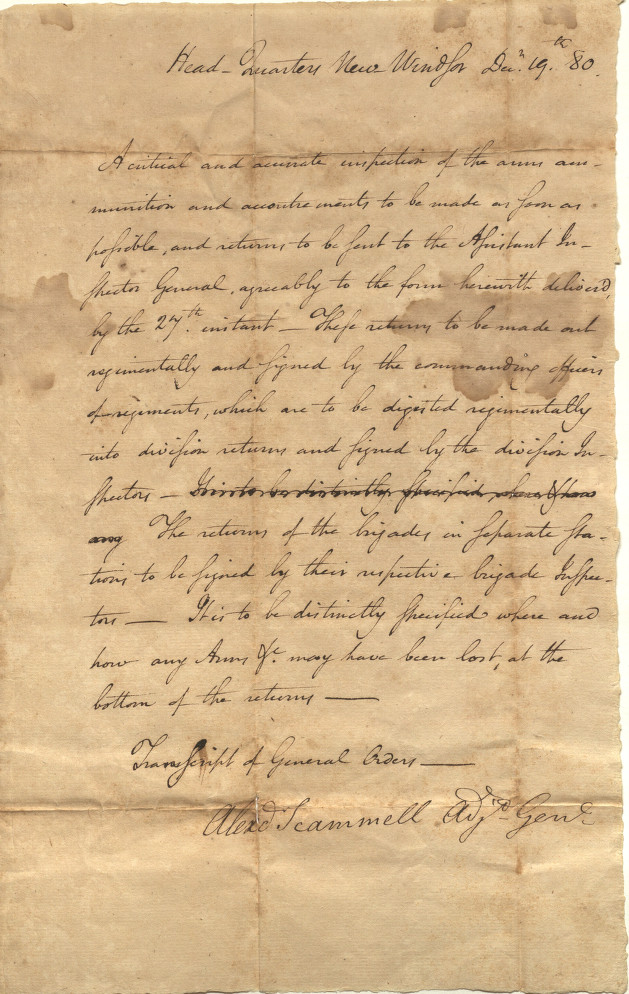
Transcript of General Orders from Colonel Alexander Scammell, 1780

He was ultimately replaced in early 1781 by Edward Hand. Scammell was reassigned as commander of the 1st NH Regiment in early 1781. However, on May 17, 1781, he was assigned command of a light infantry detachment that became known as Scammell's Light Infantry, and this regiment fought at the Battle of King's Bridge, and was the vanguard for the Army's march South to Yorktown. Once at Yorktown the regiment was organized as part of the 2nd brigade of The Light Infantry Division at Yorktown (1781).

On September 30, 1781, while serving as Field Officer-of-the-Day, Scammell was wounded while reconnoitering recently abandoned British fortifications. He had become separated from his scouting party, encountered a party of British light dragoons, and was shot in the side (accounts differ as to whether this occurred before or after he surrendered). He was taken into Yorktown, but because of the gravity of his wound he was paroled to Williamsburg, only to die on October 6.

== Legacy ==
A monument was erected in Williamsburg to Scammell but may never have been engraved the following inscription:

Alexander Scammell, Adjutant-General of the American armies, and the Colonel of the First Regiment of New Hampshire, while he commanded a chosen corps of Light Infantry at the successful siege of Yorktown, in Virginia, was in gallant performance of his duty as field officer of the day, unfortunately captured, and afterwards insidiously wounded of which wound he expired at Williamsburgh, October 1781 Anno Ætatis.

What though no friend could ward thine early fall,
Nor guardian angels turn the treacherous ball;
Bless'd shade, be soothed! Thy virtues all are known--
Thy fame shall last beyond this mouldering stone,
Which conquering armies, from their toils return,
Read to thy glory while thy fate they mourn.

The inscription was written by Scammell's friend, Col. David Humphreys of Rhode Island.

A commemorative engraving, entitled "Death of Col. Scammell at the Siege of Yorktown", by Alonzo Chappel, was published by Johnson Fry & Company, NY, in 1859.

Both Alexander Scammell Wadsworth and Henry Alexander Scammell Dearborn were named by his friends Peleg Wadsworth and Henry Dearborn in memory of him. Lieutenant Colonel Alexander Scammell Brooks, the son of Colonel John Brooks of Massachusetts, who would later become the 11th governor of that state, was born Oct 19, 1781.

Fort Scammell in Casco Bay, Maine, is named after him. Also in 1933, the Alexander Scammell Bridge over the Bellamy River near Durham, New Hampshire, was named after him and a street was named in his honor at the time of the founding of Marietta, Ohio, the first establishment in the Northwest Territory.

== As a person ==
Scammell was a tall man for the times. Accounts differ, with him described as being 6'2" to 6'5" tall with blue eyes and a fair complexion. As a member of Washington's inner circle for three years, he was known for having an easy manner and being one of the few people who could lighten the moods of and make George Washington laugh with his humorous stories and jokes. In fact Washington considered Scammell to be one of the funniest men in the army. Scammell had the rare ability to lead and inspire loyalty as evinced by one of his captains, who at the Siege of Yorktown shortly after the taking of Redoubt #10, sacrificed his own honor by threatening the life of the captured Major Campbell to avenge his favorite (Col Scammell); Alexander Hamilton, who commanded the American assault, interceded saved Major Campbell.

== See also ==
- New Hampshire Historical Marker No. 165: The Alexander Scammell Bridge over the Bellamy River

Military offices
