= John F. Hamtramck =

American military officer (1798–1858)

John Francis Hamtramck
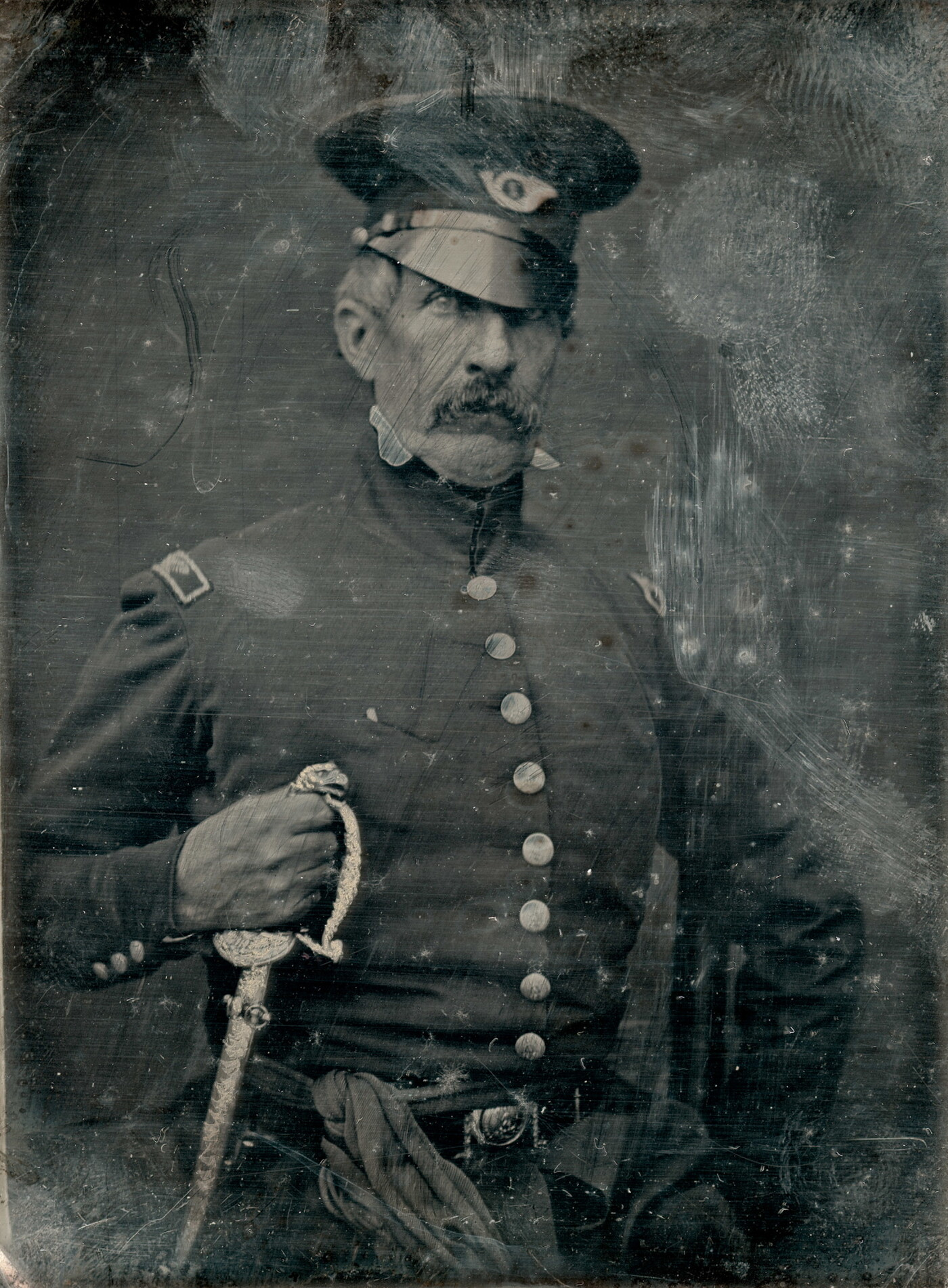
- Born: April 19, 1798; Fort Wayne, Indiana Territory
- Died: April 21, 1858 (aged 60); Shepherdstown, Virginia
- Burial place: Elmwood Cemetery, Shepherdstown
- Relatives: Jean F. Hamtramck Sr. (father); William H. Harrison (legal guardian)
- Military career
- Allegiance: United States of America
- Branch: United States Army; Virginia Militia
- Service years: 1813–1815, 1819-1822, 1846-1848
- Rank: Colonel
- Units: 1st U.S. Infantry Regiment; 3rd U.S. Artillery Regiment
- Commands: 1st Virginia Infantry Regiment
- Conflicts: War of 1812; Mexican-American War
- Other work: planter, mayor

John Francis Hamtramck Jr. (April 19, 1798 – April 21, 1858) was an American military officer who served in the War of 1812 and the Mexican-American War. He was the son of French-Canadian U.S. Army officer Jean Francois Hamtramck Sr.

== Early life ==
John Francis Hamtramck Jr. was born to Jean-François Hamtramck and his wife Rebecca MacKenzie on April 19, 1798, at Fort Wayne in the Indiana Territory. When Colonel Hamtramck died in 1803 William Henry Harrison, the territorial governor and later President of the USA, became guardian to the children. In 1806 Rebecca married a second time, her new husband being Jesse Burgess Thomas.

During the War of 1812, John Francis Hamtramck enlisted in the United States Army, becoming a Sergeant in the 1st U.S. Infantry Regiment (his father's unit). He served in Zachary Taylor's expedition up the Mississippi River. In 1815 he became a cadet at United States Military Academy in West Point, New York, appointed from Indiana. He graduated in 1819 as 11th out of a class of 26. He became a 2nd Lieutenant in the artillery and served in the 3rd U.S. Artillery Regiment when he resigned in 1822.

== Later life ==
Hamtramck then became a farmer and for several years served as an indian agent to the Osage before settling down as a farmer again, this time in Jefferson County, Virginia. There he also was active in the militia, becoming a captain, and in the Whig Party. After the Mexican-American War had begun he volunteered for service and was named Colonel of the 1st Virginia Infantry Regiment in December 1846. The United States Volunteers unit had 14 companies, including one of Grenadiers and one of Light Infantry, and was raised for the duration of the war. It's officer corps included prominent people like Major Jubal Early, Captains Kenton Harper and Montgomery D. Corse and Lieutenant David A. Weisiger. The regiment served in northern Mexico and saw little action, Hamtramck became military governor of Saltillo in early 1848. Quartermaster James L. Kemper described the Colonel as "a great stickler for the minutiae of military regulations and equipments" but added that these qualities were a necessity for the situation. The unit stayed in place till June 1848, and then was disbanded.

Hamtramck returned to Shepherdstown, continuing farming and militia duty but also became a court magistrate and, from 1850 to 1854, mayor of the town. He died on April 21, 1858.

== Sources ==
- Blanton, Nick. "John Francis Hamtramck". Historic Shepherdstown.
- Catalogue of Cadets: June 1819. West Point, New York: United States Military Academy Printing Office. 1819. p. 5.
- George W. Cullum (1868). Biographical Register of the Officers and Graduates of the United States Military Academy, Vol. I. New York: D. van Nostrand. pp. 232–233.
- Hamersly, Thomas H.S. (1881). 'Complete Regular Army Register of the United States for One Hundred Years (1779 to 1879) (2nd ed.). Washington D.C.: T.H.S. Hamersly. p. 489.
- Porter, Lorle (2005). Politics & Peril - Mount Vernon, Ohio in the Nineteenth Century. New Concord Press. p. 44. ISBN 1887932259.
- Robarts, William Hugh, ed. (1887). Mexican War veterans : a complete roster of the regular and volunteer troops in the war between the United States and Mexico, from 1846 to 1848. Brentano's. pp. 78–79.
