= Scammell's 1781 Light Infantry Regiment =

- Active: May 1781- October 1781
- Allegiance: Continental Congress of the United States
- Branch: Army
- Type: Light Infantry
- Part of: Yorktown order of battle
- Engagements: Battle of King's Bridge; Battle of Yorktown

Commanders
- Notable commanders: Colonel Alexander Scammell, John Laurens, Alexander Hamilton, Colonel William Benjamin Jr.

Most commonly referred to as Scammell's light, light corps, or detachment, this was a light infantry regiment under the new organization of the Continental Army prescribed by George Washington in his General Orders of November 1, 1780. The regiment was formed on May 17, 1781. Washington's intent for the regiment is clearly stated in a letter from him Scammell on the same date:

George Washington to Alexander Scammell

Headquarters New Windsor 17 May 1781

Dear Sir,

I have rec'd intelligence that a party of the Enemy are establishing themselves at or near Fort Lee and building a Block House or some kind of Work. If they are permitted to compleat their plan they will not only be difficult to remove but they will harass the Country from there and may be much in the way of some future operations. When I formed the Battalion which you at present command it was with the view of having Corps to execute a project of this kind which I shall propose to you, which is to endeavor to strike, by surprise, the party above mentioned. You will without loss of time see Capt. Lawrence who commands the York Levies near Dobbs Ferry and command measures with him for gaining certain intelligence of the real strength and situation of the enemy and if you find them such as Seem to give you a tolerable certainty of success you will plan your attack in such manner as shall be best in shown from your information. The sooner it is done the better, as the enemy, if they are fortifying will be every day stronger.

== Formation and Early Operations in the Highlands ==
General Washington gave command of the regiment to Alexander Scammell to honor his services as Adjutant General and to honor Scammell's wishes to command an active line unit. The men of this unit were selected from the Continental Line regiments from Connecticut, Massachusetts, and New Hampshire. Among the men under Scammell's command was Henry Dearborn who later became U.S. Secretary of War under President Thomas Jefferson.

== Prelude to Yorktown ==
The regiment was active in the subterfuge that ensured Sir Henry Clinton's forces in New York City stayed there in a defensive posture, allowing Washington's army to make their way southward to Yorktown.

== Battle of Yorktown ==
Alexander Scammell was wounded, and died a few days later in early October 1781. The regiment was divided, with companies being assigned to John Laurens and Alexander Hamilton. Some of these companies participated in the battle to take redoubt number 10 under the command of the Marquis de Lafayette.

== Bibliography ==
- Hammond, Isaac (1886). Rolls of the Soldiers in the Revolutionary War. Concord, NH: State of New Hampshire, Parson B. Cogswell, State Printer.
- Scammell, Alexander (1781). "Alexander Scammell to George Washington, Nov 16, 1780". Library of Congress.
- George, Washington (1780). "George Washington, November 1, 1780, General Orders". Library of Congress.
- George, Washington (1781). "George Washington, May 17, 1781, General Orders". Library of Congress.
- George, Washington (1781). "George Washington, May 17, 1781, Letter to Alexander Scammell". Library of Congress.
