= Jean-Joseph Sourbader de Gimat =

- Born: 1743 or 1747
- Died: Unknown
- Allegiance: Kingdom of France; United States
- Branch: Royal French Army; Continental Army
- Service years: 1761–1776, 1782–1793 (France); 1776–1782 (US)
- Rank: Lieutenant Colonel (US); Colonel (France)
- Conflicts: American Revolutionary War; Battle of Brandywine; Battle of Gloucester; Battle of Barren Hill; Battle of Monmouth; Battle of Green Spring; Siege of Yorktown

Jean-Joseph Sourbader de Gimat was a French military officer who fought in the American Revolutionary War under Marquis de Lafayette. He rose to the rank of major in the American military and fought at the Battle of Brandywine and Siege of Yorktown. After the war he served as governor of Saint Lucia.

== Early life ==
Jean-Joseph Sourbader de Gimat was born in Gascony in 1747 as the son of a French military officer. He became an ensign in the Guyenne Regiment in 1761. He did not receive promotions often and only rose to the rank of first lieutenant in 1776.

== American Revolution ==
Gimat and Louis Saint Ange Morel, chevalier de la Colombe were aides to Marquis de Lafayette. On 19 August 1777, the three men went to George Washington's headquarters north of Philadelphia. Gimat was present at the Battle of Brandywine and aided Lafayette after he was wounded during the battle. Lafayette expanded his staff to 20 French officers, including Gimat. Gimat was promoted to lieutenant colonel.

Washington ordered Lafayette on 20 February 1781 to reassemble his infantry division and capture Benedict Arnold in Virginia. Gimat was placed in charge of a battalion. Silas Deane promoted Gimat to the rank of major in the American military.

Gimat was wounded in the foot at the Siege of Yorktown. He was initially tasked with leading the assault on Redoubt 10, but Washington replaced him with Alexander Hamilton. He returned to France in 1782. He was discharged from the American military in November 1783.

== Later life ==
Due to Gimat's service in the American military he was promoted to the rank of colonel in France. He was placed in charge of a regiment in Martinique. Gimat served as the governor of Saint Lucia.

== Works cited ==
=== Books ===
- Breen, Henry (1844). St. Lucia: Historical, Statistical, and Descriptive. Longman.
- Leepson, Marc (2025). Lafayette: Lessons in Leadership from the Idealist General. University of Virginia Press. ISBN 9780813954431.
- Zucker, A. (1966). General de Kalb, Lafayette's Mentor. University of North Carolina Press. ISBN 9781469658759.

=== Web ===
- "Fix Bayonets: The Revolution's Climactic Assault at Yorktown". American Battlefield Trust. Archived from the original on 12 May 2026.
- "Lieutenant Colonel de Gimat". National Park Service. Archived from the original on 12 May 2026.
