= Bibliography of the American Revolutionary War =

The following bibliography includes notable books concerning the American Revolutionary War. These books are listed in the bibliographies of books by prominent historians as shown in the footnotes.

== General references and surveys ==
- Alden, John R. A History of the American Revolution. New York: Knopf, 1969. OCLC 35920
- Allison, David, and Larrie D. Ferreiro, eds. The American Revolution: A World War (Smithsonian, 2018)
- Allison, Robert. The American Revolution: A Concise History. New York: Oxford University Press, 2011. ISBN 978-0-19-531295-9
- Aptheker, Herbert. The American Revolution 1763–1783: An Interpretation. New York: International Publishers, 1960. ISBN 978-0-7178-0005-6. (Marxist viewpoint.)
- Asimov, Isaac. The birth of the United States, 1763–1816. Boston: Houghton Mifflin, 1974. ISBN 978-0-395-18451-6. (For juvenile audience.)
- Bailyn, Bernard. The Faces of Revolution: Personalities and Themes in the Struggle for Independence. 1980.
- Black, Jeremy. War for America. The Fight for Independence 1775–1783. New York: St. Martin's Press, 1991. ISBN 978-0-312-06713-7.
- Blanco. R.I. The American Revolution, 1775–1783: An Encyclopedia, two volumes. New York: Garland Publishing, Inc., 1993. ISBN 978-0-8240-5623-0.
- Boatner, Mark M. III The Encyclopedia of the American Revolution. New York: David McKay Co., 1994, 1966. ISBN 978-0-8117-0578-3.
- Bobrick, Benson. Angel in the Whirlwind: The Triumph of the American Revolution. New York: Simon & Schuster, 1997. ISBN 978-0-684-81060-7.
- Commager, Henry Steele and Richard B. Morris, eds. The Spirit of 'Seventy-Six': The Story of the American Revolution as told by Participants. New York: Da Capo Press, 1995. ISBN 978-0-306-80620-9. Originally published: Indianapolis: Bobbs-Merrill, 1958. online
- Conway, Stephen. The War of American Independence. London: Edward Arnold, 1995. New York E. Arnold: ISBN 978-0-340-62520-0.
- Cook, Don. The Long Fuse: How England Lost the American Colonies, 1760–1785. New York: The Atlantic Monthly Press, 1995.
- Coupland, R. The American Revolution and the British Empire. New York: Russell & Russell, 1965.
- Cumming, W.P. and Hugh Rankin. The Fate of a Nation: The American Revolution Through Contemporary Eyes. London, U.K.: Phaidon Press, 1975.
- Draper, Theodore. A Struggle for Power: The American Revolution. New York: Little, Brown & Co., 1996. ISBN 978-0-8129-2575-3.
- Dupuy, R. Ernest, Gay Hammerman, and Grace P. Hayes. The American Revolution: A Global WQar. 1977.
- Ferling, John. Almost a Miracle: The American Victory in the War of Independence. New York: Oxford University Press, 2007. ISBN 978-0-19-518121-0.
- Ferling, John. Independence: The Struggle to Set America Free. New York: Bloomsbury Press, 2011. ISBN 978-1-60819-008-9.
- Gaines, James R. For Liberty and Glory: Washington, Lafayette and Their Revolutions. New York: W.W. Norton & Company, 2007. ISBN 978-0-393-06138-3.
- Galvin, John R. The Minutemen: The First Fight: Myths and Realities of the American Revolution. 1989.
- Griffin, Patrick. America's Revolution. New York: Oxford University Press, 2012. ISBN 978-0-19-975480-9.
- Griffith II, Samuel B. The War for American Independence: From 1760 to the Surrender at Yorktown in 1781. Urbana, IL: University of Illinois Press, 2002. ISBN 978-0-252-07060-0. Originally published as In Defense of the Public Liberty. Garden City, NY: Doubleday, 1976.
- Hannings, Bud. Chronology of the American Revolution: Military and Political Actions Day by Day. Jefferson, North Carolina: McFarland & Company, Inc., 2008. ISBN 978-0-7864-2948-6.
- Harvey, Robert. "A Few Bloody Noses": The Realities and Mythologies of the American Revolution. 2001.
- Heale, M. J. The American Revolution. London: Methuen, 1986. ISBN 978-0-416-38910-4.
- Herrera, Ricardo A. "American War of Independence" Oxford Bibliographies (2017) annotated guide to major scholarly books and articles online
- Hibbert, Christopher. Redcoats and Rebels: The American Revolution Through British Eyes. New York: Norton, 1990. ISBN 978-0-393-02895-9.
- Higginbotham, Don. The War of American Independence, Military Attitudes, Policies, and Practice, 1763–87. New York: Macmillan, 1971. OCLC 142627
- Hoffman, Ronald, and Peter J. Albert, editors. Arms and Independence: The Military Character of the American Revolution. 1984.
- Ketchum, Richard M., ed. The American Heritage Book of the Revolution. New York: American Heritage, 1958. OCLC 1809644
- Lancaster, Bruce. The American Heritage History of the American Revolution. New York: American Heritage, 1975. OCLC 21423227.
- Lancaster, Bruce. The American Revolution. New York: American Heritage, 1985. ISBN 978-0-8281-0281-0.
- Lancaster, Bruce. From Lexington to Liberty: The Story of the American Revolution. Garden City, New York: Doubleday, 1955. OCLC 964459
- Langguth, A. J. Patriots: The Men Who Started the American Revolution. New York: Simon & Schuster (Touchstone), 1988. ISBN 978-0-671-67562-2. Originally published New York: Simon & Schuster, 1988.
- Leckie, Robert. George Washington's War: The Saga of the American Revolution. New York: Harper Perennial, a division of HarperCollins, 1993. ISBN 978-0-06-092215-3. First published 1992.
- Lossing, Benson J. The Pictorial Field-Book of the American Revolution. New York: Harper and Brothers, 1852.
- MacDonald, Robert (2008). "American Revolution". In Hamowy, Ronald (ed.). The Encyclopedia of Libertarianism. Thousand Oaks, CA: Sage; Cato Institute. pp. 8–10. doi:10.4135/9781412965811.n6. ISBN 978-1-4129-6580-4. LCCN 2008009151. OCLC 750831024.
- Mackesy, Piers. The War for America, 1775–1783. Bison Book Edition. Lincoln, NE: University of Nebraska Press, 1993. ISBN 978-0-8032-8192-9. Originally published: Cambridge, MA: Harvard University Press, 1964.
- McCullough, David. 1776. New York: Simon & Schuster, Inc., 2005. ISBN 978-0-7432-2671-4. (Winner of the Pulitzer Prize.)
- McNab, Chris, editor. The Improbable Victory: The Campaigns, Battles, and Soldiers of the American Revolution 1775–1783. Oxford, U.K.: Osprey Publishing, 2017. ISBN 978-1-4728-2314-4.
- Middlekauff, Robert. The Glorious Cause: The American Revolution 1763–1789. The Oxford History of the United States. New York: Oxford University Press, 1982. ISBN 978-0-19-502921-5.
- Murray, Rev. James. An Impartial History of the War in America, two volumes. Newcastle, Eng.: Printed for T. Robson, 1780.
- Namier, Lewis. England in the Age of the American Independence. 2004.
- Nester, William R. The Frontier War for American Independence. 2004.
- O'Shaughnessy, Andrew Jackson. The Men Who Lost America: British Leadership, the American Revolution, and the Fate of Empire. New Haven, CT: Yale University Press, 2013. ISBN 978-0-300-19107-3.
- Palmer, Dave R. George Washington's Military Genius. Washington, DC: Regnery Publishing, Inc., 2012. ISBN 978-1-59698-791-3.
- Parkinson, Roger. The American Revolution. The Putnam Pictorial Sources Series. New York: G. P. Putnam's Sons, 1971. OCLC 155390.
- Paul, Joel Richard. Unlikely Allies: How a Merchant, a Playwright and a Spy Saved the American Revolution. New York: Riverhead Books, 2009. ISBN 978-1-59448-883-2.
- Peckham, Howard H. The Toll of Independence: Engagements and Battle Casualties of the American Revolution. 1974.
- Peckham, Howard H. The War for Independence: A Military History. Chicago, Illinois: University of Chicago Press, 1958.
- Pearson, Michael. Those Damned Rebels: The American Revolution Through British Eyes. Cambridge, MA: Da Capo Press, 2000. ISBN 978-0-306-80983-5. Originally published New York: G. P. Putnam's Sons, 1974. OCLC 308651
- Philbrick, Nathaniel. Valiant Ambition: George Washington, Benedict Arnold, and the Fate of the American Revolution. New York: Penguin, 2016. ISBN 978-0-14-311019-4.
- Preston, John Hyde. "A Short History of the American Revolution". Wildside Press, 2023. ISBN 978-1434487872.
- Purcell, L. Edward and David F. Burg, eds. World Almanac of the American Revolution. New York: Pharos, 1992.
- Raphael, Ray. A People's History of the American Revolution: How Common People Shaped the Fight for Independence. New York: New Press, 2001.
- Robson, Eric. The American Revolution in its Political and Military Aspects, 1763–83. New York: W. W. Norton, 1966. OCLC 425602.
- Savas, Theodore P. and J. David Dameron. A Guide to the Battles of the American Revolution. New York: Savas, Beattie LLC, 2010. ISBN 978-1-932714-94-4.
- Scheer, George F. and Hugh F. Rankin. Rebels and Redcoats. Cleveland, Ohio: The World Publishing Co., 1967.
- Seymour, William. The Price of Folly: British Blunders in the War of American Independence. London, U.K.: Brassey's, 1995.
- Shy, John A People Numerous and Armed: Reflections on the Military Struggle for American Independence. Ann Arbor, Michigan: University of Michigan Press, 1990.
- Smith, Page. A New Age Now Begins: A People's History of the American Revolution. New York: McGraw Hill, 1976. ISBN 978-0-07-059097-7.
- Stember, Sol. The Bicentennial Guide to the American Revolution, two volumes. New York: E. P. Dutton & Co., Inc., 1974. ISBN 978-0-8415-0310-6.
- Stephenson, Michael. Patriot Battles: How the War of Independence Was Fought. New York: HarperCollins, 2007. ISBN 978-0-06-073261-5.
- Tonsetic, Robert L. 1781: The Decisive Year of the Revolutionary War. Philadelphia, Pennsylvania: Casemate, 2011. ISBN 978-1-61200-063-3.
- Tuchman, Barbara W. The First Salute: A View of the American Revolution. New York: Alfred A. Knopf, 1988. ISBN 978-0-394-55333-7.
- Upton, Leslie F. S. Revolutionary Versus Loyalist: The First American Civil War, 1774–84. Waltham, Mass., Blaisdell Pub. Co., 1968. OCLC 442085.
- Ward, Christopher. John Richard Alden, ed. The War of the Revolution. New York: Skyhorse Publishing, 2011. ISBN 978-1-61608-080-8. Originally published Old Saybrook, CT: Konecky & Konecky, 1952.
- Warren, Mercy Otis. History of the Rise, Progress and Termination of the American Revolution, three volumes. Boston, Massachusetts: Manning and Loring, 1805.
- Wood, Gordon S. The American Revolution: A History. New York: The Modern Library, 2002.

== Background to the war ==
- Andrews, Charles M. The Colonial Background of the American Revolution. New Haven, Connecticut: 1931. OCLC 964290.
- Archer, Richard. As If an Enemy's Country: The British Occupation of Boston and the Origins of the American Revolution. Oxford and New York: Oxford University Press, 2010. ISBN 978-0-19-538247-1.
- Beeman, Richard. Our Lives, Our Fortunes & Our Sacred Honor: The Forging of American Independence, 1774–1776. New York: Basic Books, 2013. ISBN 978-0-465-02629-6.
- Bailyn, Bernard. The Ideological Origins of the American Revolution. Enlarged Edition. Cambridge, MA: The Belknap Press of Harvard University Press, 1992. ISBN 978-0-674-44302-0. Originally published: Cambridge, MA: Harvard University Press, 1967.
- Beeman, Richard. Our Lives, Our Fortunes & Our Sacred Honor: The Forging of American Independence, 1774–1776. New York: Basic Books, 2013. ISBN 978-0-465-02629-6.
- Black, Jeremy. "Could the British Have Won the American War of Independence?." Journal of the Society for Army Historical Research. (Fall 1996), Vol. 74 Issue 299, pp 145–154. online video lecture, uses Real Player
- Carp, Benjamin L. Defiance of the Patriots: The Boston Tea Party and the Making of America. New Haven: Yale University Press, 2010. ISBN 978-0-300-11705-9.
- Decker, Malcolm. Brink of Revolution: New York in Crisis, 1765–1776. New York: Argosy Antiquarian, 1964.
- Leach, Douglas Edward. Roots of Conflict: British Armed Forces and Colonial Americans, 1677–1763. Chapel Hill, North Carolina: University of North Carolina Press, 1986.
- Maier, Pauline. From Resistance to Revolution: Colonial Radicals and the Development of American Opposition to Britain, 1765–1776. New York: Knopf, 1972. ISBN 978-0-394-46190-8.
- Nuenschwander, John A. The Middle Colonies and the Coming of the American Revolution. Port Washington: 1973. ISBN 978-0-8046-9054-6.
- Norton, Mary Beth. 1774: The Long Year of Revolution (2020) online review by Gordon S. Wood
- Phillips, Kevin. 1775: A Good Year for Revolution. New York: Viking, 2012. ISBN 978-0-670-02512-1.
- Standiford, Les. Desperate Sons: Samuel Adams, Patrick Henry, John Hancock, and the Secret Bands of Radicals Who Led the Colonies to War. New York: Harper, an imprint of HarperCollins Publishers, 2012. ISBN 978-0-06-189955-3.
- Unger, Harlow Giles. American Tempest: How the Boston Tea Party Sparked a Revolution. Cambridge, MA: Da Capo Press, 2011. ISBN 978-0-306-81962-9.

== Maps and atlases ==
- Barnes, Ian. The Historical Atlas of the American Revolution. New York: Routledge, 2000. ISBN 0-415-92243-7.
- Carrington, Henry B. Battle Maps and Charts of the American Revolution. 1974
- Guthorn, Jeter. American Maps and Map Makers of the Revolution. Monmouth, NJ: Philip Freneau Press, 1966. OCLC 1019460.
- Symonds, Craig L. A Battlefield Atlas of the American Revolution. Baltimore, Maryland: The Nautical & Aviation Publishing Company of America, Inc., 1986. ISBN 0-933852-53-3.

== Battles and campaigns ==
- Adelberg, Michael S. The American Revolution in Monmouth County: The Theatre of Spoil and Destruction. Charleston, SC: The History Press, 2010. ISBN 978-1-60949-001-0.
- Piecuch, Jim, ed. Cavalry of the American Revolution. Yardley, PA: Westholme Publishing, LLC, 2012. ISBN 978-1-59416-154-4. pp. 261–265.
- Berleth, Richard. Bloody Mohawk: The French and Indian War & American Revolution on New York's Frontier. Delmar, NY: Black Dome Press Corp., 2009, Paperback, 2010. ISBN 978-1-883789-66-4.
- Bird, Harrison. Attack on Quebec: The American Invasion of Canada, 1775–1776. New York: 1968. OCLC 440055.
- Bliven, Jr., Bruce. Battle for Manhattan. New York: Holt, 1956. OCLC 1387032.
- Bodle, Wayne. Valley Forge Winter: Civilians and Soldiers in War. University Park, Pennsylvania: Penn State University Press, 2002.
- Borkow, Richard, George Washington's Westchester Gamble: The Encampment on the Hudson & the Trapping of Cornwallis. Charleston, South Carolina: The History Press, 2011. ISBN 978-1-60949-039-3.
- Brown, Lloyd A. Loyalist Operations at New Haven, Including Capt. Patrick Ferguson's Letter with Map Dated May 27, 1779, and Capt. Nathan Hubbel's Raid on New Haven, April 19, 1781. Meriden, Connecticut: Timothy Press, 1938.
- Buchanan, John. The Road to Guilford Courthouse: The American Revolution in the Carolinas. Hoboken, NJ: John Wiley & Sons, Inc., 2004. ISBN 978-0-471-32716-5.
- Buchanan, John. The Road to Valley Forge: How Washington Built the Army That Won the Revolution. Hoboken, NJ: John Wiley & Sons, Inc., 2004. ISBN 978-0-471-44156-4.
- Carrington, Henry B. Battles of the American Revolution 1775–1781. New York: A. S. Barnes & Company, 1877. OCLC 712647.
- Chidsey, Donald Barr. The Tide Turns: An Informal History of the Campaign of 1776 in the American Revolution. New York: Crown Publishers, 1966.
- Coleman, Jr. J. Winston. The British Invasion of Kentucky: With an Account of the Capture of Ruddle's and Martin's Stations, June 1780. 1951.
- Cook, Don. The Long Fuse: How England Lost the America Colonies, 1760–1785. New York: The Atlantic Monthly Press, 1995. ISBN 978-0-87113-661-9.
- Drew, Bernard A. Henry Knox and the Revolutionary War Trail in Western Massachusetts. Jefferson, North Carolina: McFarland & Company, Inc., 2012. ISBN 978-0-7864-6276-6.
- Duncombe, Frances Riker and Dorothy Humphreys Hinitt, eds. The Burning of Bedford, July 1779: As Reported in Contemporary Documents and Eyewitness Accounts. Bedford, New York: Bedford Historical Society, 1974.
- Edgar, Walter. Partisans & Redcoats: The Southern Conflict That Turned the Tide of the American Revolution. New York: Perennial, an imprint of HarperCollins, 2003. Originally published New York: William Morrow, an imprint of HarperCollins, 2001. ISBN 978-0-380-80643-0.
- Fleming, Thomas. 1776: Year of Illusions. New York: Norton, 1975.
- Fleming, Thomas J. Forgotten Victory: The Battle of New Jersey, 1780. Pleasantville, New York: Reader's Digest Press, 1973. ISBN 978-0-88349-003-7.
- Fleming, Thomas J. Washington's Secret War: The Hidden History of Valley Forge. New York: Collins (Smithsonian Books), 2006. Originally published: New York: HarperCollins, 2005. ISBN 978-0-06-087293-9.
- French, Allen. The First Year of the Revolution. 1934.
- Galvin, John R. The Minute Men: The First Fight: Myths and Realities of the American Revolution. Dulles, VA: Potomac Books, Inc., 2006. ISBN 978-1-59797-070-9. Originally published by Hawthorne Books, Inc. 1967.
- Hayes, John T. Tomahawks and Sabres: Indians in Combat against Cavalry in the American Revolution, 1777–1781. Fort Lauderdale, Florida: Saddlebag Press, 1996.
- Kwasny, Mark V. Washington's Partisan War 1775–1783. Kent, Ohio: Kent State University Press, 1996. ISBN 0-87338-546-2.
- Lefkowitz, Arthur S. The Long Retreat: The Calamitous Defense of New Jersey, 1776. New Brunswick, NJ: Rutgers University Press, 1999. ISBN 978-0-8135-2759-8. Originally published Metuchen, New Jersey: Upland Press, 1998.
- Lewis, James A. The Final Campaign of the American Revolution: Rise and Fall of the Spanish Bahamas. 1991.
- Lumpkin, Henry. From Savannah to Yorktown: The American Revolution in the South. Paragon House, 1981.
- McBurney, Christian M. The Rhode Island Campaign: The First French and American Operation in the Revolutionary War. Yardley, PA: Westholme Publishing, LLC, 2011. ISBN 978-1-59416-134-6.
- Patterson, Alfred T. The Other Armada: The Franco–Spanish Attempt to Invade Britain in 1779. 1960.
- Reed, John F. Campaign to Valley Forge. Philadelphia, Pennsylvania: Pioneer Press, 1980. ISBN 978-0-913150-42-9.
- Schecter, Barnet. The Battle for New York: The City at the Heart of the American Revolution. New York: Penguin Books, 2003. First published by Walker Publishing Company, Inc. 2002. ISBN 978-0-14-200333-6.
- Smith, Justin H. Our Struggle for the Fourteenth Colony: Canada and the American Revolution, two volumes. New York: G.P. Putnam's Sons, 1907.
- Smith, Richard B. Ethan Allen & The Capture of Fort Ticonderoga: America's First Victory. Charleston, SC: The History Press, 2010. ISBN 978-1-59629-920-7.
- Tonsetic, Robert L. Special Operations During the American Revolution. Philadelphia, Oxford: Casemate Publishers, 2013. ISBN 978-1-61200-165-4.
- Tonsetic, Robert L. 1781: The Decisive Year of the Revolutionary War. Havertown, PA: Casemate Publishers, 2011. ISBN 978-1-61200-078-7.
- Williams, Glenn F. Year of the Hangman: George Washington's Campaign Against the Iroquois. Yardley, PA: Westholme Publishing, 2006. ISBN 978-1-59416-013-4.
- Wilson, David K. The Southern Strategy: Britain's Conquest of South Carolina and Georgia, 1775–1780. Columbia, SC: The University of South Carolina Press, 2008. Hardcover edition first published 2005. ISBN 978-1-57003-797-9.
- Wilson, Samuel M. Battle of the Blue Licks. 1927.
- Young, Bennett H. History of the Battle of Blue Licks. 1897.

=== Battles of Lexington and Concord ===
- Bell, J. L. The Road to Concord: How Four Stolen Cannon Ignited the Revolutionary War. Westholme Publishing, 2016.
- Birnbaum, Louis. Red Dawn at Lexington. Houghton Mifflin, 1986. ISBN 978-0-395-38814-3.
- Borneman, Walter R. American Spring: Lexington, Concord, and the Road to Revolution. Little, Brown, 2014.
- Daughan, George C. Lexington and Concord: The Battle Heard Round the World. W. W. Norton, 2018.
- Fischer, David Hackett. Paul Revere’s Ride. Oxford University Press, 1994. ISBN 978-0-19-509831-0.
- Forthingham, Richard. History of the Siege of Boston and the Battles of Lexington, Concord, and Bunker Hill; Also, an Account of the Bunker Hill Monument with Illustrative Documents. Scholars, 2005.
- Galvin, John R. The Minute Men: The First Fight: Myths and Realities of the American Revolution. Potomac Books, 2006.
- Greenwalt, Phillip S., and Robert Orrison. A Single Blow: The Battles of Lexington and Concord and the Beginning of the American Revolution, April 19, 1775. Savas Beatie, 2018.
- Gross, Robert A. The Minutemen and Their World. Revised and expanded ed., Picador, 2022.
- Rourtellot, Arthur Bernon. Lexington and Concord: The Beginning of the War of the American Revolution. New York: Norton, 2000.

=== Battle of Monmouth ===
- Bilby, Joseph G. and Katherine Bilby Jenkins. Monmouth Court House: The Battle that Made the American Army. Yardley, Pennsylvania: Westholme Publishing LLC, 2010. ISBN 978-1-59416-108-7.
- Morrissey, Brenden. Monmouth Courthouse 1778: The Last Great Battle in the North. Cambridge, England: Osprey, 2004. ISBN 978-1-84176-772-7.
- Smith, Samuel S. The Battle of Monmouth. Monmouth Beach, New Jersey: Philip Frenau Press, 1964. OCLC 972279.
- Smith, Samuel S. The Battle of Monmouth. Trenton, New Jersey: New Jersey Historical Commission, 1975. OCLC 2189283.
- Stryker, William S. The Battle of Monmouth. Princeton, New Jersey: 1927. OCLC 1678204.
- Thayer, Theodore. Washington and Lee at Monmouth: The Making of a Scapegoat. 1976.
- Walling, Richard. Men of Color at the Battle of Monmouth, June 28, 1778. Hightstown, N.J. : Longstreet House, 1994. ISBN 978-0-944413-29-6.

=== Battles of Trenton and Princeton ===
- Bill, Alfred Hoyt. The Campaign of Princeton, 1776–1777. Princeton, New Jersey: Princeton University Press, 1948. OCLC 301252.
- Bonk, David. Trenton and Princeton 1776–77: Washington Crosses the Delaware. Oxford, U.K.: Osprey Publishing, 2009.
- Dwyer, William M. The Day is Ours!: November 1776 – January 1777: An Inside View of the Battles of Trenton and Princeton. New York: Viking Press, 1983. ISBN 978-0-670-11446-7.
- Fischer, David Hackett. Washington's Crossing. Oxford, New York: Oxford University Press, 2006. First published 2004. ISBN 978-0-19-518159-3.
- Ketchum, Richard M. The Winter Soldiers: The Battles for Trenton and Princeton. New York: Henry Holt & Co., LLC, 1999. ISBN 978-0-8050-6098-0. Originally published: New York: Doubleday, 1973.
- Stryker, William S. The Battles of Trenton and Princeton. Boston, Massachusetts: 1898. OCLC 57406555.

=== Canadian campaign ===
- Bird, Harrison. Attack on Quebec: The American Invasion of Canada, 1775. Oxford University Press, 1968. ISBN 978-0-19-500482-3.
- Codman, John. Arnold's Expedition to Quebec. New York: MacMillan Company, 1901.
- Desjardin, Thomas A. Through A Howling Wilderness: Benedict Arnold's March to Quebec, 1775. New York, St. Martin's Griffin, 2007. ISBN 0-312-33905-4. Originally published in hard cover: New York, St. Martin's Press, 2006. ISBN 978-0-306-71932-5.
- Hatch, Robert M. Thrust for Canada: The American Attempt on Quebec in 1775–1776. Boston, Massachusetts: Houghton Mifflin, 1979. ISBN 978-0-395-27612-9.
- Lefkowitz, Arthur S. Benedict Arnold's Army: The 1775 American Invasion of Canada During the Revolutionary War. New York: Savas Beattie LLC, 2008. ISBN 978-1-932714-03-6.
- Morrissey, Brendan. Quebec, 1775: The American Invasion of Canada. Oxford, U.K.: Osprey Publishing, 2003. ISBN 978-1-84176-681-2.
- Smith, Justin H. Arnold's March from Cambridge to Quebec. New York: G.P. Putnam's Sons, 1903.
- Stanley, George F. G. Canada Invaded, 1775–1776. Toronto: Samuel Stevens Hakkert, 1973. ISBN 978-0-88866-537-9.

=== New York campaign ===
- Adams, Jr., Charles Francis. The Battle of Long Island. (reprinted from American Historical Review, Vol. I, July 1896).
- Gallagher, John J. The Battle of Brooklyn 1776. Edison, New Jersey: Castle Books, 1995. ISBN 0-7858-1663-1.
- Johnston, Henry P. The Battle of Harlem Heights. New York. 1897. ISBN 978-0-306-71932-5.
- Johnston, Henry P. The Campaign of 1776 Around New York and Brooklyn. Brooklyn, New York: Long Island Historical Society, 1878. ISBN 978-0-306-71932-5.
- Manders, Eric I. The Battle of Long Island. Monmouth Beach, New Jersey: Philip Freneau Press, 1978.
- Reno, Linda Davis. The Maryland 400 in the Battle of Long Island, 1776. Jefferson, North Carolina: McFarland & Company, Inc., 2008. ISBN 978-0-7864-3537-1.
- Schecter, Barnet. The Battle for New York: The City at the Heart of the American Revolution. New York: Penguin Books, 2003. First published by Walker Publishing Company, Inc. 2002. ISBN 978-0-14-200333-6.
- Stevenson, Charles C. and Irene H. Wilson. The Battle of Long Island, The Battle of Brooklyn. The Brooklyn Bicentennial Committee, 1975. OCLC 78539358.

=== New York City area after 1777 ===
- Dawson, Henry B. The Assault on Stoney Point by General Anthony Wayne, July 16, 1779, Prepared for the New York Historical Society and Read at Its Regular Meeting, April 1, 1862, with Some Illustrative Notes. New York: New York Historical Society, 1863. Reprinted by General Books, 2009.
- Loprieno, Don. The Enterprise in Contemplation: The Midnight Assault of Stony Point. Westminster, Maryland: Heritage, 2004.
- Schecter, Barnet. The Battle for New York: The City at the Heart of the American Revolution. New York: Penguin Books, 2003. First published by Walker Publishing Company, Inc. 2002. ISBN 978-0-14-200333-6.
- Schellhammer, Michael. George Washington and the Final British Campaign for the Hudson River, 1779. Jefferson, NC: McFarland and Co., Inc., 2012. ISBN 978-0-7864-6807-2.
- Sklarsky, I.W. The Revolution's Boldest Venture: The Story of General "Mad" Anthony Wayne's Assault on Stony Point. Poughkeepsie, New York: Kennikat, 1965.

=== Philadelphia campaign ===
- Bruce, Robert. Brandywine: The Battle at Chadds Ford and Birmingham Meeting House, in Adjoining Parts of Chester and Delaware Counties, Pennsylvania, September 11, 1777. Clinton, New York: Robert Bruce, 1922.
- Edgar, Gregory T. The Philadelphia Campaign. Bowie, Maryland: Heritage Books, Inc., 1998.
- Harris, Michael C. Brandywine: A Military History of the Battle that Lost Philadelphia but Saved America, September 11, 1777. El Dorado Hills, California: Savas Beatie LLC, 2014. ISBN 978-1-61121-162-7.
- Harris, Michael C. Germantown: A Ministry History of the Battle for Philadelphia, October 4, 1777. El Dorado Hills, California: Savas Beatie, 2020. ISBN 978-1-61121-519-9.
- Jackson, John W. Whitemarsh, 1777: Impregnable Stronghold. Historical Society of Fort Washington, 1984.
- Johnson, Virginia Spake and Nancy V. Webster. The Battle of Brandywine: 1777-1977 Chadds Ford, Pennsylvania. Brandywine Battlefield Park, 1977.
- McGuire, Thomas J. Battle of Paoli. Mechanicsburg, Pennsylvania: Stackpole Books, 2000. ISBN 978-0-8117-0198-3.
- McGuire, Thomas J. The Philadelphia Campaign: Brandywine and the Fall of Philadelphia. Volume 1. Mechanicsburg, Pennsylvania: Stackpole Books, 2006. ISBN 978-0-8117-0178-5.
- McGuire, Thomas J. The Philadelphia Campaign: Germantown and the Roads to Valley Forge. Volume 2. Mechanicsburg, Pennsylvania: Stackpole Books, 2007. ISBN 978-0-8117-0206-5.
- Martin, David G. The Philadelphia Campaign: June 1777–July 1778. Cambridge, Massachusetts: Da Capo Press, 1993. ISBN 978-0-938289-19-7.
- Mowday, Bruce E. September 11, 1777: Washington's Defeat at Brandywine Dooms Philadelphia. Shippensburg, Pennsylvania: White Mane Books, 2002. ISBN 1-57249-328-3.
- Smith, Samuel S. The Battle of Brandywine. Monmouth Beach, New Jersey: Philip Frenau Press, 1976. ISBN 978-0-912480-12-1.
- Taaffe, Stephen R. The Philadelphia Campaign: 1777–1778. Lawrence, Kansas: University of Kansas Press, 2003. ISBN 978-0-7006-1267-3.
- Townsend, Joseph. The Battle of Brandywine. 1969.

=== Saratoga Campaign ===
- Bird, Harrison. March to Saratoga: General Burgoyne and the American Campaign, 1777. New York: Oxford, 1963. OCLC 299497.
- Elting, John R. The Battle of Saratoga. Phillip Freneau Press, 1977. ISBN 9780912480138.
- Furneaux, Rupert. The Battle of Saratoga. New York: 1971. ISBN 978-0-8128-1305-0.
- Gabriel, Michael P. The Battle of Bennington: Soldiers & Civilians. Charleston, South Carolina: The History Press, 2012. ISBN 978-1-60949-515-2.
- Ketchum, Richard M. Saratoga: Turning Point of America's Revolutionary War. New York: A John Macrae/Owl Book, Henry Holt & Co., LLC, 1999. ISBN 978-0-8050-6123-9. Originally published in hard cover by Henry Holt and Company, LLC, 1997.
- Luzader, John F. Decision on the Hudson: The Battles of Saratoga. Fort Washington: 2002. OCLC 1462598.
- Luzader, John F. Documentary Research Report on the Saratoga Campaign to September 19, 1777. Saratoga National Historical Park, 1960. OCLC 32302329.
- Luzader, John F. Saratoga: A Military History of the Decisive Campaign of the American Revolution. New York: Savas Beatie, 2010. ISBN 978-1-932714-44-9.
- Mintz, Max. The Generals of Saratoga: John Burgoyne and Horatio Gates. New Haven, CT: Yale University Press, 1990. ISBN 978-0-300-04778-3.
- Morrissey, Brendan. Saratoga, 1777: Turning Point of a Revolution. 1961.
- Neilson, Charles. Burgoyne's Campaign and the Memorable Battle of Bemis Heights. Albany, New York: 1844. OCLC 166598275.
- Parks, Joseph W.P. The Battle of Bennington. 1970.
- Watt, Gavin K. Rebellion in the Mohawk Valley: The St. Leger Expedition of 1777. Toronto; Tonawanda, NY: Dundurn Press, 2002. ISBN 978-1-55002-376-3.
- Williams, John. The Battle of Hubbardton: The American Rebels Stem the Tide. Montpelier: Vermont Division of Historic Preservation, 1988. ISBN 978-0-9619912-1-0.

=== Siege of Boston ===
- Birnbaum, Louis. Red Dawn at Lexington: "If they mean to have a war, let it begin here!". Boston: Houghton Mifflin, 1986. ISBN 978-0-395-38814-3.
- Bowne, William L. Ye Cohorn Caravan: The Knox Expedition in the Winter of 1775–1776. New York: Knopf, 1955.
- Brooks, Victor. The Boston Campaign: April 1775-March 1776. Conshohocken, Pennsylvania: Combined Publishing, 1999.
- Cash, Philip. Medical Men at the Siege of Boston, April 1775–April 1776. 1973.
- Chidsey, Donald B. The Siege of Boston. New York: 1966. OCLC 890813.
- Elting, John R. The Battle of Bunker's Hill. 1975.
- Fleming, Thomas J. Now We are Enemies: The Story of Bunker Hill. New York: St. Martin's Press, 1960. OCLC 9718703.
- French, Allen. The Siege of Boston. 1911.
- Frothingham, Richard. History of the Siege of Boston and the Battles of Lexington, Concord, and Bunker Hill. New York, Da Capo Press, 1970. ISBN 978-0-306-71932-5.
- Ketchum, Richard M. Decisive Day: The Battle for Bunker Hill. New York: Henry Holt & Co., LLC, 1999. ISBN 978-0-8050-6099-7. Originally published as The Battle of Bunker Hill by Doubleday, 1962. Published as Decisive Day by Garden City, NY: Doubleday, 1974.
- Lockhart, Paul. The Whites of Their Eyes: Bunker Hill, the First American Army, and the Emergence of George Washington. New York: HarperCollins, 2011. ISBN 978-0-06-195886-1.
- Morrissey, Brendan. Boston, 1775: The Shot Heard Around the World. London, U.K.: Osprey, 1995.
- Nelson, James L. With Fire and Sword: The Battle of Bunker Hill and the Beginning of the American Revolution. New York: Thomas Dunne Books, an imprint of St. Martin's Press, 2011. ISBN 978-0-312-57644-8.
- Philbrick, Nathaniel. Bunker Hill: A City, a Siege, a Revolution. New York: Viking, 2013. ISBN 978-0-670-02544-2.
- Tourtellot, Arthur B. Lexington and Concord: The Beginning of the War of the American Revolution. New York: W. W. Norton & Co., 1963, reissued 2000. ISBN 978-0-393-32056-5. Originally published as William Diamond's Drum. Doubleday & Company, 1959.

=== Southern theater 1780–1782 ===
- Babits, Lawrence E. A Devil of a Whipping: The Battle of Cowpens. Chapel Hill: University of North Carolina Press, 1998. ISBN 978-0-8078-4926-2.
- Babits, Lawrence E., and Joshua B. Howard. Long, Obstinate, and Bloody: The Battle of Guilford Courthouse. Chapel Hill: The University of North Carolina Press, 2009. ISBN 978-0-8078-3266-0.
- Baker, Thomas E. Another Such Victory: The Story of the American Defeat at Guilford Courthouse that Helped Win the War for Independence. New York: Eastern Acorn Press, 1992. First published 1981. ISBN 978-0-89062-105-9.
- Bearss, Edwin C. Battle of Cowpens: A Documented Narrative and Troop Movement Maps. Johnson City, Tennessee: The Overmountain Press, 1996. Originally published by National Park Service, 1967. ISBN 978-1-57072-045-1.
- Borick, Carl P. A Gallant Defense: The Siege of Charleston, 1780. Columbia, South Carolina: University of South Carolina Press, 2003. Paperback edition 2012. ISBN 978-1-57003-487-9.
- Buchanan, John. The Road to Guilford Courthouse: The American Revolution in the Carolinas. New York: John Wiley & Sons, Inc., 1997.
- Dameron, J. David. Kings Mountain: The Defeat of the Loyalists. Da Capo Press, 2003.
- De Peyster, Jr. Watts. The Battle of Eutaw Springs, South Carolina: Saturday, 8, September, 1781. No publisher listed, no date listed.
- Dykeman, Wilma. The Battle of Kings Mountain 1780: With Fire and Sword. Washington, D.C.: National Park Service, 1978. OCLC 2596896.
- Gilbert, Ed and Catherine Gilbert. Cowpens 1781: Turning Point of the American Revolution. Oxford, U.K.: Osprey Publishing, 2016.
- Hairr, John. Guilford Courthouse: Nathaniel Greene's Victory in Defeat, March 15, 1781. Cambridge, Massachusetts: Da Capo Press, 2002. ISBN 978-0-85052-957-9.
- Hayes, John T. Massacre: Tarleton vs. Buford, May 29, 1780, & Lee vs. Pyle, February 23, 1781. Fort Lauderdale, Florida: Saddlebag Press, 1997.
- Konstam, Angus. Guilford Courthouse, 1781: Lord Cornwallis's Ruinous Victory. 2002.
- Landers, H.L. The Battle of Camden, S.C., August 16, 1780. Kershaw County Historical Society, 1997.
- Oller, John. The Swamp Fox: How Francis Marion Saved the American Revolution. Boston: Da Capo Press, 2016. ISBN 978-0-306-82457-9.
- Pancake, John S. This Destructive War: The British Campaign in the Carolinas, 1780–1782. Tuscaloosa, AL: University of Alabama Press, 1992. ISBN 978-0-8173-0191-0.
- Swager, Christine R. The Valiant Died: The Battle of Eutaw Springs, September 8, 1781. Westminster, Maryland: Heritage Books, Inc., 2007. ISBN 978-0-7884-4102-8.
- Weighley, Russell F. The Partisan War: The Southern Carolina Campaign of 1780–1782. Columbia, South Carolina: University of South Carolina Press, 1970.

=== Yorktown Campaign ===
- Bonsal, Stephen. When the French Were Here: A Narrative of the Yorktown Campaign. 1945.
- Davis, Burke. The Campaign That Won America: The Story of Yorktown. Conshohocken, Pennsylvania: Eastern Acorn Press, 1996. OCLC 39752924. Originally published: New York: Dial Press, 1970.
- Fleming, Thomas J. Beat the Last Drum: The Siege of Yorktown, 1781. New York: St. Martins Press, 1963. OCLC 992870.
- Greene, Jerome A. The Guns of Independence: The Siege of Yorktown, 1781. New York: Savas Beatie, LLC, 2009. ISBN 978-1-932714-68-5.
- Hallahan, William H. The Day the Revolution Ended, 19 October 1781. Hoboken, New Jersey: John Wiley and Sons, Inc., 2004.
- Johnston, Henry P. The Yorktown Campaign and the Surrender of Cornwallis 1781. New York: Harper & Brothers, 1881. OCLC 426009.
- Ketchum, Richard M. Victory at Yorktown: The Campaign that Won the Revolution. New York: Henry Holt & Co., LLC. 2004. ISBN 978-0-8050-7396-6.
- Landers, Colonel H.L. The Virginia Campaign and the Blockade and Siege of Yorktown, 1781. Washington, D.C.: U.S. Government Printing Office, 1931.
- Morrissey, Brandon. Yorktown 1781: The World Turned Upside Down. Osprey, 1997.

== Spies, intelligence and espionage ==
- CIA. Intelligence in the War of Independence (Central Intelligence Agency) (2017) online
- Crary, Catherine Snell. "The Tory and the Spy: The Double Life of James Rivington." William and Mary Quarterly (1959): 16#1 pp 61–72. online
- Harty, Jared B. "George Washington: Spymaster and General Who Saved the American Revolution" (Staff paper, No. ATZL-SWV. Army Command And General Staff College Fort Leavenworth, School Of Advanced Military Studies, 2012) online.
- Kaplan, Roger. "The Hidden War: British Intelligence Operations during the American Revolution." William and Mary Quarterly (1990) 47#1: 115–138. online
- Kilmeade, Brian, and Don Yaeger. George Washington's Secret Six: The Spy Ring that Saved the American Revolution (Penguin, 2016).
- Mahoney, Henry Thayer and Marjorie Locke Mahoney. Gallantry in Action: A Biographic Dictionary of Espionage in the American Revolutionary War.. Lanham, MD: University Press of America, Inc., 1999. ISBN 978-0-7618-1479-5.
- Misencik, Paul R. Sally Townsend, George Washington's Teenage Spy (McFarland, 2015).
- Nagy, John A. Dr. Benjamin Church, Spy: A Case of Espionage on the Eve of the American Revolution. Yardley, PA: Westholme Publishing, 2013. ISBN 978-1-59416-184-1.
- Nagy, John A. Invisible Ink – Spycraft of the American Revolution. Yardley, PA: Westholme Publishing, 2011. ISBN 1-59416-141-0. General history on espionage during the American Revolution.
- Nagy, John A. Spies in the Continental Capital: Espionage Across Pennsylvania During the American Revolution. Yardley, PA: Westholme Publishing, 2011. ISBN 1-59416-133-X.
- O'Toole, George J.A. Honorable Treachery: A History of US Intelligence, Espionage, and Covert Action from the American Revolution to the CIA (2nd ed. 2014).
- Rose, Alexander. Washington's Spies: The Story of America's First Spy Ring. (2006). ISBN 978-0-553-38329-4. Focuses on the Culper Ring.
- Van Doren, Carl. Secret History of the American Revolution. 1941.
- Weber, Ralph E., editor. Masked Dispatches: Cryptograms and Cryptology in American History, 1775–1900. National Security Agency, 1993.

=== Primary sources ===
- "Spy Letters of the American Revolution" includes letters from numerous spies including Arnold's 1779-80 letters to Clinton and André, proposing treason; from the Clements Library
- Van Doren, Carl. Secret History of the American Revolution: An Account of the Conspiracies of Benedict Arnold and Numerous Others Drawn from the Secret Service Papers of the British Headquarters in North America now for the first time examined and made public (1941) online free

== States, regions, and cities ==
- Alden, John R. The South in the Revolution, 1763–1789. 1957.
- Bliven, Bruce. Under the Guns: New York, 1775–1776. New York: Harper & Row, 1972.
- Buel, Richard. Dear Liberty: Connecticut's Mobilization for the Revolutionary War. Middleton, Connecticut: Wesleyan University Press, 1980.
- Calloway, Colin G. The American Revolution in Indian Country. 1995.
- Cashin, Edward J. and Heard Robertson. Augusta and the American Revolution. 1975.
- Caughey, John W. Bernardo de Galvez in Louisiana, 1776–1783. 1934.
- Chidsey, Donal B. The War in the South: The Carolinas and Georgia in the American Revolution. 1969.
- Coleman, Kenneth. The American Revolution in Georgia. 1985.
- Crow, Jeffrey J., and Larry E. Tise. The Southern Experience in the American Revolution. 1978.
- Daniell, Jere. Experiment in Republicanism: New Hampshire Politics and the American Revolution, 1741–1794. 1970.
- Davis, Jr. Robert S. Georgia Citizens and Soldiers of the American Revolution. 1979.
- Diamant, Lincoln. Chaining the Hudson: The Fight for the River in the American Revolution. no place listed: Carol Publishing Group, 1994.
- Dunkerly, Robert M. Redcoats on the Cape Fear: The Revolutionary War in Southeastern North Carolina, revised edition. Jefferson, North Carolina: McFarland & Company, Inc., 2012. ISBN 978-0-7864-6958-1.
- Gifford, Edward S. The American Revolution in the Delaware Valley. 1976.
- Gordon, John W. South Carolina and the American Revolution: A Battlefield History. Columbia, SC: University of South Carolina Press, 2003. ISBN 978-1-57003-480-0.
- Harper, Robert W. Old Gloucester County and the American Revolution, 1763–1778. Woodbury, New Jersey: Gloucester County Cultural and Heritage Commission, 1986. OCLC 15247102.
- Holmes, Jack D.L. The 1779 "Marcha de Galvez": Louisiana's Giant Step Forward in the American Revolution. 1974.
- Knoblock, Glenn A. "Strong and Brave Fellows": New Hampshire's Black Soldiers and Sailors of the American Revolution, 1775–1784. Jefferson, North Carolina: McFarland & Company, Inc., 2003. ISBN 978-0-7864-1548-9.
- Lumpkin, Henry. From Savannah to Yorktown: The American Revolution in the South. New York: Paragon House, 1987.
- McCowen, Jr., George S. The British Occupation of Charleston, 1780–1782. 1972.
- Nadelhart, Jerome J. The Disorders of War: The Revolution in South Carolina. Orono, Maine: University of Maine at Orono Press, 1981. ISBN 0-89101-049-1.
- O'Kelley, Patrick. Nothing but Blood and Slaughter: The Revolutionary War in the Carolinas Volume One 1771–1779. United States : Booklocker.com, Inc., 2004. ISBN 978-1-59113-458-9.
- O'Kelley, Patrick. Nothing but Blood and Slaughter: The Revolutionary War in the Carolinas Volume Two 1780. United States : Booklocker.com, Inc., 2004. ISBN 978-1-59113-588-3.
- O'Kelley, Patrick. Nothing but Blood and Slaughter: The Revolutionary War in the Carolinas Volume Three 1781. United States : Booklocker.com, Inc., 2005. ISBN 978-1-59113-700-9.
- O'Kelley, Patrick. Nothing but Blood and Slaughter: The Revolutionary War in the Carolinas Volume Four 1782. United States : Booklocker.com, Inc., 2004. ISBN 978-1-59113-823-5.
- Pancake, John S. This Destructive War: The British Campaign in the Carolinas, 1780–1782. University, Alabama: University of Alabama Press, 1985.
- Patterson, Stephen E. Political Parties in Revolutionary Massachusetts. 1973.
- Raab, James W. Spain, Britain and the American Revolution in Florida, 1763–1783. Jefferson, North Carolina: McFarland & Company, Inc., 2008. ISBN 978-0-7864-3213-4.
- Ramsey, David. The History of the Revolution in South Carolina, two volumes. 1785.
- Russell, David Lee. The American Revolution in the Southern Colonies. Jefferson, North Carolina: McFarland & Company, Inc., 2009. ISBN 978-0-7864-4339-0.
- Schecter, Barnet. The Battle for New York: The City at the Heart of the American Revolution. New York: Penguin Books, 2003. First published by Walker Publishing Company, Inc. 2002. ISBN 978-0-14-200333-6.
- Selby, John. The Revolution in Virginia, 1775–1783. 1989.
- Starr, J. Barton. The American Revolution in West Florida. 1976.
- Swisher, James K. The Revolutionary War in the Southern Back Country. Gretna, Louisiana: Pelican Publishing Co., Inc., 2008. ISBN 978-1-58980-503-3.
- Upton, Richard. Revolutionary New Hampshire. 1971.
- Whiteley, William G. The Revolutionary Soldiers of Delaware. Wilmington, Delaware: James & Webb Printers, 1875.
- Williams, Edward G. Fort Pitt and the Revolution on the Western Frontier. 1968.
- Wright, Jr., J. Leitch. Florida in the American Revolution. Gainesville, Florida: The University Presses of Florida, 1975. ISBN 0-8130-0524-8.

=== New Jersey ===
- Adelberg, Michael S. The American Revolution in Monmouth County: The Theatre of Spoil and Destruction. Charleston, South Carolina: The History Press, 2010. ISBN 978-1-60949-001-0.
- Bill, Alfred Hoyt. New Jersey and the Revolutionary War. Princeton, New Jersey: D. Van Nostrand, 1964. OCLC 341870.
- Hoffman, Robert V. The Revolutionary Scene in New Jersey. New York: American Historical Company, 1942.
- Karels, Carol, ed. The Revolutionary War in Bergen County: The Times That Tried Men's Souls. Charleston, South Carolina: History Press, 2007. ISBN 978-1-59629-358-8.
- Leiby, Adrian. The Revolutionary War in the Hackensack Valley: The Jersey Dutch and the Neutral Ground. New Brunswick, New Jersey: Rutgers University Press, 1980. OCLC 2183380. Originally published: New Brunswick, New Jersey: Rutgers University Press. 1962. Second edition: New Brunswick, NJ: Rutgers University Press, 1992. ISBN 978-0-8135-0898-6.
- Lundin, Leonard. Cockpit of the Revolution: The War of Independence in New Jersey. Lundn Press, 2007. Reprint. Originally published: Princeton, New Jersey: Princeton University Press, 1940. ISBN 978-1-4067-5923-5.
- Owen, Lewis F. The Revolutionary Struggle of New Jersey. 1975.

=== New York ===
- (prepared by the Division of Archives and History) The American Revolution in New York: Its Political, Social, and Economic Significance. Albany, New York: University of the State of New York, 1926.
- Barck, Oscar Theodore. New York City During the War for Independence. Port Washington, New York: Ira J. Friedman, 1966. Originally published New York, Columbia University Press, 1931. OCLC 477746.
- Bliven, Jr., Bruce. Under the Guns: New York, 1775–1776. New York: Harper & Row, 1972. ISBN 978-0-06-010379-8.
- Countryman, Edward. A People in Revolution: The American Revolution and Political Society in New York, 1760–1790. Baltimore, Maryland: Johns Hopkins University Press, 1981.
- Flick, Alexander C., ed. The American Revolution in New York: Its Political, Social and Economic Significance. Port Washington, New York: Ira J. Friedman, 1967. Reprint of 1926 edition. OCLC 944613.
- Flint, Martha Bockee. Long Island Before the Revolution: A Colonial Story. Port Washington, New York: Ira J. Friedman, 1967. Originally published 1896 as Early Long Island. OCLC 983352.
- Johnson, James M., Christopher Pryslopski and Andrew Villani, eds. Key to the Northern Country: The Hudson River Valley in the American Revolution. Albany, NY: State University of New York Press, 2013. ISBN 978-1-4384-4814-5.
- Jones, Thomas. History of New York During the Revolutionary War, two volumes. Cranbury, NJ: The Scholar's Bookshelf, 2006. ISBN 978-1-60105-056-4. Originally published New York: New York Historical Society, 1879.
- Ketchum, Richard M. Divided Loyalties: How the American Revolution Came to New York. New York: Holt, 2002.
- Luke, Mayron H. and Robert W. Long Island in the American Revolution. Albany, New York: New York State American Revolutionary Bicentennial Commission, 1976. OCLC 2787114
- Onderdonk, Henry. Revolutionary Incidents of Suffolk and Kings Counties. New York: Leavitt & Co., 1849. OCLC 2017113.
- Onderdonk, Henry. Revolutionary Incidents in Queens County. New York: Leavitt, Trow, 1846. OCLC 34198090.
- Pasquale, Christopher D. An Object of Great Importance: The Hudson River During the American War for Independence. Baltimore, Maryland: Publish America, 2007.
- Polf, William A. Garrison Town: The British Occupation of New York City, 1776–1783. Albany, New York: New York State American Revolution Bicentennial Commission, 1976.
- Schecter, Barnet. The Battle for New York: The City at the Heart of the American Revolution. New York: Walker & Co., 2002.
- Van Burskirk, Judith L. Generous Enemies: Patriots and Loyalists in Revolutionary New York. Philadelphia: University of Pennsylvania Press, 2002.
- Wertenbaker, Thomas Jefferson. Father Knickerbocker Rebels: New York City During the Revolution. New York: Scribners, 1948. OCLC 476634.

=== Pennsylvania ===
- Doerflinger, Thoms M. A Vigorous Spirit of Enterprise: Merchants and Economic Development in Revolutionary Philadelphia. 1986.
- Frantz, John B. and William Pencak, eds. Beyond Philadelphia: The American Revolution in the Pennsylvania Hinterland. University Park, Pennsylvania: Pennsylvania State University Press, 1998.
- Knouff, Gregory T. The Soldiers' Revolution: Pennsylvanians in Arms and the Forging of Early American Identity. University Park, Pennsylvania: Pennsylvania State University Press, 2004.
- Linn, John Blair and William H. Egle. Pennsylvania in the War of the Revolution, battalions and line. 1775–1783, two volumes. Harrisburg, Pennsylvania: Lane S. Hart, State Printer, 1880. OCLC 1850676.

== Naval ==
- Allen, Gardner W. A Naval History of the American Revolution. Reprint: Williamstown, MA: 1970. OCLC 468413389. Originally published Boston: Houghton Mifflin Co., 1913.
- Coggins, Jack. Ships and Seamen of the American Revolution. Dover Publications, 2002.
- Daughan, George C. If By Sea: The Forging of the American Navy – From the Revolution to the War of 1812. New York: Basic Books, A Member of the Perseus Books Group, 2008. ISBN 978-0-465-01607-5.
- Dull, Jonathan. The French Navy and American Independence: A Study of Arms and Diplomacy, 1774–1787. Princeton, New Jersey: Princeton University Press, 1975.
- Fowler, William M. Rebels Under Sail: The American Navy During the Revolution. 1976.
- Hearn, Cheser G. George Washington's Schooners: The First American Navy. Annapolis, Maryland: Naval Institute Press, 1995.
- Jackson, John W. The Pennsylvania Navy, 1775–1781: The Defense of the Delaware. New Brunswick, New Jersey: Rutgers University Press, 1974.
- James, William. The British Navy in Adversity: A Strategy of the War & Independence. 1926.
- Larrabee, Harold A. Decision at the Chesapeake. 1964.
- Mager, S.L., editor. Navies of the American Revolution. 1975.
- Mahan, ALfred T. The Major Operations of the Navies in the War of American Independence. Boston, Massachusetts: Little Brown 1913.
- Miller, Nathan. Sea of Glory: A Naval History of the American Revolution. New York: David McKay Company, Inc., 1974.
- Morgan, William James, ed. Naval Documents of the American Revolution, six volumes. Washington, D.C.: U.S. Department of the Navy, 1969–1972.
- Nelson, James L. Benedict Arnold's Navy: The Ragtag Fleet that Lost the Battle of Lake Champlain but Won the American Revolution. Camden, ME: International Marine/McGraw-Hill, 2006. ISBN 978-0-07-146806-0.
- Nelson, James L. George Washington's Great Gamble: And the Sea Battle That Won the American Revolution. New York: McGraw-Hill, 2010. ISBN 978-0-07-162679-8.
- Nelson, James L. George Washington's Secret Navy: How the American Revolution Went to Sea. New York: McGraw-Hill, 2008. ISBN 978-0-07-149389-5.
- Paulin, Charles O. The Navy in the American Revolution. 1971.
- Stewart, Robert Armistead. The History of the Virginia Navy of the Revolution. 1943.
- Syrett, David. The Royal Navy in American Waters, 1775–1783. Aldershot, Hants, England: Scolar Press; Brookfield, Vermont: Gower Pub. Co., 1989. ISBN 978-0-85967-806-3.
- Tilley, John A. The British Navy and the American Revolution. Columbia, South Carolina: University of South Carolina Press, 1987. ISBN 978-0-87249-517-3.

== Unit histories ==
- Katcher, Philip. Armies of the American Wars, 1755–1815. New York: Hastings House, 1975. ISBN 978-0-8038-0389-3.
- Piecuch, Jim, ed. Cavalry of the American Revolution. Yardley, Pennsylvania: Westholme Publishing, LLC, 2012. ISBN 978-1-59416-154-4.

=== British units ===
- Atwood, Rodney. The Hessians: Mercenaries from Hessen–Kassel in the American Revolution. 1980.
- Chartand, Rene. American Loyalist Troops, 1775–1784. Oxford and New York: Oxford, Osprey, 2008.
- Curtis, Edward E. The British Army in the American Revolution. Ganesvoort, New York: Corner House Historical Publications, 1998.
- Curtis, Edward E. The Organization of the British Army in the American Revolution. Cranbury, New Jersey: Scholars Bookshelf, 2005. ISBN 978-0-945726-06-7. Originally published New York: Yale University Press, 1926.
- Fortescue, Sir John. The War of Independence: The British Army in North America, 1775–1783. London: Greenhill Books, 2001. ISBN 978-1-85367-452-5.
- Katcher, Philip R. N. Encyclopedia of British, Provincial, and German Auxiliary Units 1775–1783. Harrisburg, Pennsylvania: Stackpole Books, 1973. ISBN 978-0-8117-0542-4.
- Katcher, Philip R.N. King George's Army, 1775–1783: A Handbook of British, American and German Regiments. 1973.
- Lowell, Edward J. The Hessians and Other German Auxiliaries of Great Britain in the Revolutionary War. Westminster, Maryland: Heritage Books, Inc., 2008. ISBN 978-0-7884-1614-9. Originally published New York: Harper, 1884.
- May, Robin and Gerry Embleton. The British Army in North America, 1775–1783. Cambridge, England: Osprey, 1997. ISBN 978-1-85532-735-1.
- Spring, Matthew H. With Zeal and With Bayonets Only: The British Army on Campaign in North America, 1775–1783. Norman, Oklahoma: University of Oklahoma Press, 2010. ISBN 978-0-8061-4152-7. Originally published in hard cover, 2008.
- Atkinson, C. T. Regimental History: The Royal Hampshire Regiment. Glasgow, Scotland: The University Press, 1950. OCLC 38867393.
- Atwood, R. The Hessians: Mercenaries from Hessen-Kassel in the American Revolution. Cambridge, England: Cambridge University Press, 1980. ISBN 978-0-521-22884-8.
- Baer, Friederike. Hessians: German Soldiers in the American Revolutionary War. Oxford University Press, 2022.
- Baker, A. J. The East Yorkshire Regiment (the 15th Regiment of Foot). London: Leo Cooper Ltd., 1971. ISBN 978-0-85052-057-6
- Broughton–Mainwaring, Rowland. Historical Record of the Royal Welch Fusiliers. London: Hatchards, Piccadilly, 1889. OCLC 2472553.
- Burgoyne, Bruce E. The Hesse-Cassel Mirbach Regiment in the American Revolution. Bowie, Maryland: Heritage Books, 1998.
- Cannon, Richard, ed. Historical Record of the Fifteenth, or, the Yorkshire East Riding Regiment of Foot. London: Parker, Furnivall, & Parker, 1848.OCLC 2364660.
- Cary, A. D. L. and Stouppe McCance. Regimental Records of the Royal Welsh Fusiliers. London: Royal United Service Institution, 1921. OCLC 8014359.
- Cowper, L. E. The King's Own: The Story of a Royal Regiment. Oxford: University Press, 1939. OCLC 4521045.
- Daniell, Davis Scott. Cup of Honour: The Story of the Gloucestershire Regiment (The 28th/61st Foot) 1694–1950. London: George C. Harrap & Co., 1951.OCLC 1730243.
- Everard, H. History of Thomas Farrington's Regiment subsequently designation the 29th (Worcestershire) Foot, 1694 to 1891. Worcester, England: 1891.
- Ingles, C. J. The Queen's Rangers in the Revolutionary War. [Montreal?] 1956. OCLC 10272496.
- Jones, Robert J. A History of the 15th (East Yorkshire) Regiment (The Duke of York's Own). London: National Army Museum, 1958. OCLC 6918892.
- Lee, Albert. History of the Tenth Foot: The Lincolnshire Regiment. London: Gale & Polden Ltd., 1911. OCLC 8014214.
- Lee, Albert. History of the Thirty–Third Foot: Duke of Wellington's Regiment. Norwich, United Kingdom: Jarrold & Sons, Ltd., The Empire Press, 1922. OCLC 22146915.
- Robins, Frederick B. The Queen's Rangers. London: The National Army Museum, 1954.
- Sincoe, John Graves. A History of the Operations of a Partisan Corps Called the Queen's Rangers. 1844.
- Urban, Mark. Fusiliers: The Saga of a British Redcoat Regiment in the American Revolution. New York: Walker & Company, 2007. ISBN 978-0-8027-1647-7.
- Walker, H. M. A History of the Northumberland Fusiliers 1674–1902. London: John Murray, 1919. OCLC 10611666.
- Watt, Gavin K. The King's Royal Regiment of New York. 1984.
- Webb, E.A.H. A History of the Services of the 17th (The Leicestershire) Regiment, Containing an Account of the Formation of the Regiment in 1688, and Its Subsequent Services, Revised and Continued to March 31st, 1912. London: Vacher & Sons, 1912.

=== American units ===
- Balch, Thomas, ed. Papers Relating Chiefly to the Maryland Line During the Revolution. Philadelphia: Printed for the Seventy-Six Society, 1857.
- Berg, Fred Anderson. Encyclopedia of Continental Army Units: Battalions, Regiments, and Independent Corps. Harrisburg, Pennsylvania: Stackpole Books, 1972.
- Bolton, Charles K. The Private Soldier under Washington. 1902.
- Bowman, Allen. The Morale of the American Revolutionary Army. Washington, D.C.: American Council on Public Affairs, 1943.
- Carp, E. Wayne. To Starve the Army at Pleasure: Continental Army Administration and American Political Culture, 1775–1783. 1984.
- Chadwick, Bruce. The First American Army: The Untold Story of George Washington and the Men behind America's First Fight for Freedom. Naperville, Illinois: Source Books, Inc., 2005. ISBN 978-1-4022-0506-4.
- Cubbison, Douglas R. The American Northern Theater Army in 1776: The Ruin and Reconstruction of the Continental Force. Jefferson, North Carolina: McFarland & Company, Inc., 2010. ISBN 978-0-7864-4564-6.
- Hatch, Louis Clinton. The Administration of the American Revolutionary Army. London: 1904. OCLC 1677998.
- Lesser, Charles H., ed. The Sinews of Independence: Monthly Strength Reports of the Colonial Army. Chicago, Illinois: University of Chicago Press, 1976. ISBN 978-0-226-47332-1.
- Loescher, Burt Garfield. Washington's Eyes: The Continental Light Dragoons. Fort Collins, Colorado: Old Army Press, 1977.
- Montross, Lynn. The Story of the Continental Army, 1775–1783. New York: Barnes & Noble, 1967.
- Neimeyer, Charls Patrick. America Goes to War: A Social History of the Continental Army. 1996.
- Piecuch, Jim, ed. Cavalry of the American Revolution. Yardley, PA: Westholme Publishing, LLC, 2012. ISBN 978-1-59416-154-4.
- Rosswurm, Steven: Arms, Country, and Class: The Philadelphia Militia and the "Lower Sort" during the American Revolution. New Brunswick, New Jersey: Rutgers University Press, 1989.
- Royster, Charles. A Revolutionary People at War: The Continental Army & American Character, 1775–1783. Chapel Hill, North Carolina: University of North Carolina Press, 1979.
- Selesky, Harold W. A Demographic Survey of the Continental Army That Wintered at Valley Forge, 1777–1778. New Haven Connecticut: 1987.
- Wright, Jr., Robert K. The Continental Army. Washington, D.C.: Center of Military History, United States Army, 2000, 1986. ISBN 978-0-16-001931-9.
- Billias, George A. General John Glover and His Marblehead Mariners. New York: Holt, 1960. (Shown as John Glover and His Marblehead Men in source.) OCLC 230745.
- Hayes, John T. Connecticut's Revolutionary Cavalry: Sheldon's Horse. Chester, Connecticut: Pequot Press, 1975.
- Kajencki, Francis C. The Pulaski Legion in the American Revolution. El Paso, Texas: Southwest Polonia Press, 2004.
- Kidder, Francis. History of the First New Hampshire Regiment in the War of the Revolution. Albany, New York: Joel Munsell, 1868. OCLC 1424356.
- Maurer, William C. F. Dragoon Diary: The History of the Third Continental Light Dragoons. Bloomington, Indiana: AuthorHouse, 2005.
- McKenzie, Matthew G. Barefooted, Bare Leg'd, Bare Breech'd: The Revolutionary War Service of the Massachusetts Continental Line. Boston, Massachusetts: Massachusetts Society of the Cincinnati, 1995.
- Rankin, Hugh F. The North Carolina Continentals. Chapel Hill, North Carolina: University of North Carolina Press, 1971. ISBN 978-0-8078-1154-2.
- Reno, Linda Davis. The Maryland 400 in the Battle of Long Island, 1776. Jefferson, North Carolina: McFarland & Company, Inc., 2008. ISBN 978-0-7864-3537-1.
- Stille, Charles J. Major General Anthony Wayne and the Pennsylvania Line in the Continental Army. Philadelphia, Pennsylvania: J. B. Lippincott Company, 1893. OCLC 504757713
- Trussell, John B.B. The Pennsylvania Line. Harrisburg, Pennsylvania: Commonwealth of Pennsylvania, Historical and Museum Commission, 1993.
- Walker, Anthony. So Few the Brave: Rhode Island Continentals, 1775–1783. Newport, Rhode Island: Seafield Press, 1981.
- Ward, Christopher L. The Delaware Continentals 1776–1783. Wilmington, Delaware: The Historical Society of Delaware, 1941. OCLC 2153031.
- Ward, Harry M. General William Maxwell and the New Jersey Continentals. Westport, Connecticut: Greenwood Press, 1997. ISBN 978-0-313-30432-3.
- Wilson, Joseph Lapsley. Book of the First Troop, Philadelphia City Cavalry, 1774–1914. Philadelphia, Pennsylvania: Hallowell Co., 1915.

=== French units ===
- Balck, Thomas. The French in America during the War of Independence of the United States 1773–1783, two volumes. 1972.
- Chartrand, Rene. The French Army in the American War of Independence. 1991
- Dull, Jonathan. The French Navy and American Independence: A Study of Arms and Diplomacy, 1774–1787. Princeton, New Jersey: Princeton University Press, 1975. ISBN 978-0-691-06920-3.
- Hamilton, E.P. The French Army in America. 1967
- Kennett, Lee. The French Forces in America, 1780–1783. Westport, Connecticut: Greenwood Press, 1977. ISBN 978-0-8371-9544-5.
- Rice, Howard C., and Ann S.K. Brown, editors. The American Campaigns of Rochambeau's Army. 1972.

== Uniforms and equipment ==
- Bailey, D.W. British Military Longarms, 1715–1815. 1971.
- Blackmore, H.L. British Military Firearms, 1650–1850. 1961.
- Elting, John R. Military Uniforms in America: The Era of the American Revolution, 1755–1795. San Rafael, California: Presidio Press, 1974. OCLC 7486142.
- Franklin, Carl. British Army Uniforms of the American Revolution, 1751–1783. Havertown: Pen and Sword, 2013. ISBN 978-1-84884-690-6.
- Kaufman, Henry J. The Pennsylvania–Kentucky Rifle. 1960.
- Lefferts, Charles M. Uniforms of the American, British, French, and German Armies in the War of the American Revolution. New York: New York Historical Society, 1926.
- Mollo, John. Uniforms of the American Revolution. New York: Macmillan, 1975. ISBN 978-0-02-585580-9.
- Moore, Warren. Weapons of the American Revolution. 1967.
- Neumann, George C. Battle Weapons of the American Revolution. Woonsocket, RI: Mowbray Publishers, 2011. ISBN 978-1-931464-49-9. Earlier work History of the Weapons of the American Revolution. New York: Outlet, 1975.
- Peterson, Harold L. Arms and Armor in Colonial America, 1526–1783. 1956.
- Richardson, Edward W. Standards and Colors of the American Revolution. University of Pennsylvania Press, 1989.

== Strategy, command, and supply ==
- Baker, N. Government and Contractors: The British Treasury and War Supplies. London: Athlone, 1971. ISBN 978-0-485-13130-7.
- Benninghoff II, Herman O. Valley Forge: A Genesis for Command and Control, Continental Army Style. Gettysburg, Pennsylvania: Thomas Publications, 2001.
- Bowles, R. A. Logistics and the Failure of the British Army in America, 1775–1783. Princeton, NJ: Princeton University Press, 1975. ISBN 978-0-691-04630-3.
- Carp, E. Wayne. To Starve the Army at Pleasure: Continental Army Administration and American Political Culture, 1775–83. Chapel Hill, North Carolina: University of North Carolina Press, 1984. ISBN 978-0-8078-1587-8.
- Fleming, Thomas. The Strategy of Victory: How General George Washington Won the American Revolution. New York: Da Capo Press, 2017. ISBN 978-0-306-82496-8.
- Hatch, Louis Clinton. The Administration of the American Revolutionary Army. 1904.
- Huston, James A. Logistics of Liberty: American Services of Supply in the Revolutionary War and After. Newark, Delaware: University of Delaware Press, 1991.
- Palmer, Dave Richard. The Way of the Fox: American Strategy in the War for America, 1775–1783. Westport, Connecticut: Greenwood Press, 1975.
- Risch, Erna. Supplying Washington's Army. Washington, D.C.: Center of Military History, 1981.
- Rossie, Jonathan Gregory. The Politics of Command in the American Revolution. Syracuse, New York: 1975. ISBN 978-0-8156-0112-8.
- Stoker, Donald, Kenneth J. Hagan, and Michael T. McMaster, eds. Strategy in the American War of Independence: a global approach (Routledge, 2009); essays by experts
- Svedja, Georg J. Quartering, Disciplining, and Supplying the Army at Morristown, 1779–80. 1970.

== Medical ==
- Cash, Philip. Medical Men at the Siege of Boston, April 1775–April 1776. 1973.
- Duncan, Louis C. Medical Men in the American Revolution. Jefferson, North Carolina: McFarland & Co., 1998.
- Fenn, Elizabeth A. Pox Americana: The Great Smallpox Epidemic of 1775–1782. New York: Hill & Wang, 2001.
- Gillett, Mary C. The Army Medical Department, 1775–1818. Washington, D.C.: U.S. Government Printing Office, 1995.
- Reiss, M.D., Oscar. Medicine and the American Revolution: How Diseases and Their Treatments Affected the Colonial Army. Jefferson, North Carolina: McFarland & Company, Inc., 2005. ISBN 978-0-7864-2160-2.

== Biographies ==
- Baily, J. D. Commanders at Kings Mountain. Greenville, South Carolina: A Press, Inc., 1980. OCLC 7050155.
- Bailyn, Bernard. Faces of Revolution: Personalities and Themes in the Struggle for American Independence. New York: Knopf, 1990.
- Billias, George Athan. George Washington's Generals and Opponents: Their Exploits and Leadership. 2 vol. New York Da Capo Press, 1994 (1964, 1969). ISBN 978-0-306-80560-8.
- Hannings, Bud. American Revolutionary War Leaders: A Biographical Dictionary. Jefferson, North Carolina: McFarland & Company, Inc., 2009. ISBN 978-0-7864-4379-6.
- Purcell, L. Edward. Who Was Who in the American Revolution. New York: Facts on File, 1992.
- Sabine, Lorenzo. Biographical Sketches of Loyalists of the American Revolution, two volumes. Port Washington, New York: Kennikat Press, 1966.

=== British and allies biographies ===
- Baule, Stephen M. and Stephen Gilbert. British Army Officers Who Served in the American Revolution, 1775–1783. Westminster, Maryland: Heritage, 2004.
- Ford, Worthington Chauncey. British Officers Serving in the American Revolution, 1774–1783. Brooklyn, New York: Historical Print Club, 1897.
- O'Shaughnessy, Andrew Jackson. The Men Who Lost America: British Leadership, the American Revolution, and the Fate of Empire. New Haven, CT: Yale University Press, 2013. ISBN 978-0-300-19107-3.
- Alden, John R. General Gage in America – Being Principally a History of His Role in the American Revolution. Baton Rouge: Louisiana State University Press, 1948. OCLC 181362.
- Anderson, Troyer Steele. The Command of the Howe Brothers during the American Revolution. New York: Octagon Books, 1972. ISBN 978-0-403-00816-2.
- Bailyn, Bernard. The Ordeal of Thomas Hutchinson. Cambridge, MA: Belknap Press of Harvard University Press, 1974. ISBN 978-0-674-64160-0.
- Barger, B. D. Lord Dartmouth and the American Revolution. Columbia, SC: University of South Carolina Press, 1965. OCLC 426475
- Bass, Robert D. The Green Dragoon: The Lives of Banastre Tarleton and Mary Robinson. New York: Holt, 1957. OCLC 1555678.
- Black, Jeremy. George III, America's Last King. New Haven, Connecticut: Yale University Press, 2006. ISBN 978-0-403-00816-2.
- Black, Jeremy. Pitt the Elder: The Great Commoner. Gloucestershire, England: Sutton Publishing, 1999.
- Brooke, John. King George III. London: Constable, 1972.
- Cashin, Edward J. The King's Ranger: Thomas Brown and the American Revolution on the Southern Frontier. University of Georgia Press, 1989.
- Cone, Carl B. Burke and the Nature of Politics: The Age of the American Revolution. Lexington, KY, 1957. OCLC 21252059.
- Derry, James. Charles James Fox. New York: St. Martin's Press, 1972. OCLC 329417.
- Ferling, John. The Loyalist Mind: Joseph Galloway and the American Revolution. University Park, PA: Pennsylvania State University Press, 1977. ISBN 978-0-271-00514-0.
- Gilchrist, M.M. Patrick Ferguson: A Man of Some Genius. Glasgow: NMS Enterprises Limited, 2003.
- Gruber, Ira. The Howe Brothers and the American Revolution. Chapel Hill, North Carolina: University of North Carolina Press, 1972. OCLC 333567.
- Harch, Robert M. Major John Andre. 1986.
- Hargrove, Richard J. General John Burgoyne. Newark, DE: University of Delaware Press, 1983. ISBN 978-0-87413-200-7.
- Howson, Gerald. Burgoyne of Saratoga: A Biography. New York: Times Books, 1979. ISBN 978-0-8129-0770-4.
- Huddleston, F.J. Gentleman Johnny Burgoyne. Garden City, New York: Garden City Publishing, 1927.
- Kelsay, Isabel Thompson. Joseph Brant, 1743–1807, Man of Two Worlds. 1984.
- Long, J.C. Lord Jeffrey Amherst: A Soldier of the King. 1933.
- Lunt, John. John Burgoyne of Saratoga. New York: Harcourt Brace Jovanovich, 1975. OCLC 255871724.
- Lushington, S.R. The Life and Services of General Lord Harris, 2nd edition. London: John W. Parker, 1845.
- Mayo, Laurence S. Jeffrey Amherst: A Biography. 1916.
- Mintz, Max M. The Generals of Saratoga: John Burgoyne and Horatio Gates. 1990.
- Mitchell, L. G. Charles James Fox. New York & Oxford: Oxford University Press, 1992. ISBN 978-0-19-820104-5.
- Nelson, Paul David. General Sir Guy Carleton, Lord Dorchester: Soldier-Statesman of Early British Canada. London; Cranbury, NJ: Associated University Presses, 2000. ISBN 978-0-8386-3838-5.
- Nelson, Paul David. William Tryon and the Course of Empire: A Life in British Imperial Service. Chapel Hill, NC: University of North Carolina Press, 1990. ISBN 978-0-8078-1917-3.
- Roberts, Andrew. The Last King of America: The Misunderstood Reign of George III. Viking Press, 2021. ISBN 978-1-9848-7926-4.
- Roberts, James, ed. George III and Queen Charlotte: Patronage, Collecting, and Court Taste. London: Royal Collection Enterprises, 2004.
- Roberts, Ricky and Bryan Brown. Every Insult & Indignity: The Life, Genius and Legacy of Major Patrick Ferguson. Lexington, Kentucky: self-published, 2011.
- Sargent. Winthrop and William Abbatt, eds. Life and Career of Major John Andre, Adjutant–General of the British Army in America. New York: William Abbatt, 1902. OCLC 503692075.
- Scotti, Jr., Anthony J. Brutal Virtue: The Myth and Reality of Banastre Tarleton. Bowie, Maryland: Heritage Books, 2000.
- Stone, W.L. Life of Joseph Brant – Thayendanegea, two volumes. 1838.
- Thomas, Peter D.G. Lord North. New York: St. Martin's, 1976.
- Valentine, Alan. Lord George Germain. London: Clarendon Press, 1962. OCLC 398865.
- Valentine, Alan. Lord North. Norman, Oklahoma: University of Oklahoma Press, 1967. OCLC 399779.
- Whitley, Peter S. Lord North: The Prime Minister Who Lost America. London: Hambledon Continuum, 2007. ISBN 978-1-85285-519-2.
- Wickwire, Franklin and Mary Wickwire. Cornwallis: The American Adventure. Boston, Massachusetts: Houghton Mifflin, 1970.
- Wickwire, Franklin and Mary Wickwire. Cornwallis and the War of Independence. London, Faber and Faber Ltd., 1971. ISBN 978-0-571-09677-0.
- Willcox, William B. Portrait of A General: Sir Henry Clinton in the War of Independence. New York: Knopf, 1964. OCLC 398399.

=== American biographies ===
- Billias, George. George Washington's Generals. New York: Morrow, 1964.
- Broadwater, Robert P. American Generals of the Revolutionary War: A Biographical Dictionary. Jefferson, North Carolina: McFarland & Company, Inc., 2007. ISBN 978-0-7864-6905-5.
- Ferris, Robert G. and Richard E. Morris. The Signers of the Declaration of Independence. Flagstaff, Arizona: Interpretive Publications, 1982.
- Heitman, Francis Bernard. Historical Register of Officers of the Continental Army During the War of the Revolution, April, 1775, to December, 1783. Baltimore, Maryland: Nichols, Killam & Maffitt, 1893.
- Lefkowtiz, Arthur S. George Washington's Indispensable Men: The 32 Aides-de-Camp Who Helped Win American Independence. Mechanicsburg, Pennsylvania: Stackpole Books, 2003.
- Lively, Robert A. This Glorious Cause: The Adventures of Two Company Officers in Washington's Army. 1958.
- Meister, Charles W. The Founding Fathers. Jefferson, NC: McFarland & Company, Inc., 1987. Paperback reprint. ISBN 978-0-7864-6759-4.
- Putnam, S. Waldo. Biographical Sketches of Distinguished American Naval Heroes in the War of the Revolution. 1823.
- Ward, Harry M. For Virginia and for Independence: Twenty–Eight Revolutionary War Soldiers from the Old Dominion. Jefferson, North Carolina: McFarland & Company, Inc., 2011. ISBN 978-0-7864-6130-1.
- Alden, John Richard. General Charles Lee: Traitor or Patriot?. Baton Rouge, Louisiana: Louisiana State University Press, 1951. OCLC 1106907.
- Bennett, Charles E. and Donald R. Lennon. Major General Robert Howe and the American Revolution: A Quest for Glory. Chapel Hill: University of North Carolina Press, 1991. ISBN 978-0-8078-1982-1.
- Birzer, Bradley J. American Cicero: The Life of Charles Carroll. Wilmington, DE: ISI Books, 2010. ISBN 978-1-933859-89-7.
- Blakeslee, Katherine Walton. Mordecai Gist and His American Progenitors. Baltimore, Maryland: Daughters of the American Revolution, 1923.
- Boyd, George Adams. Elias Boudinot: Patriot Statesman, 1740–1821. 1952.
- Broadwater, Jeff. George Mason: Forgotten Founder. Chapel Hill: University of North Carolina Press, 2006.ISBN 978-0-8078-3053-6.
- Brookhiser, Richard. Gentleman Revolutionary: Gouverneur Morris: The Rake Who Wrote the Constitution. New York: Free Press, a division of Simon & Schuster, Inc., 2003. ISBN 978-0-7432-5602-5.
- Callahan, North. Daniel Morgan: Ranger of the Revolution. New York: Holt, Rinehart, and Winston, 1961. OCLC 426036.
- Campbell, Marcia. Revolutionary Services and Civil Life of General William Hull; Prepared from his Manuscripts, by His Daughter Mrs. Marcia Campbell, Together with the History of the Campaign of 1812 and the Surrender of the Post of Detroit. New York: D. Appleton, 1848.
- Callo, Joseph F. John Paul Jones: America's First Sea Warrior. Annapolis, MD: Naval Institute Press, 2006. ISBN 978-1-59114-102-0.
- Champagne, Roger. Alexander McDougall and the American Revolution. Schenectaday, New York: Union College Press, 1975.
- Chernow, Ron. Alexander Hamilton. ISBN 978-0-14-303475-9. New York: Penguin Books, 2005. First published by The Penguin Press, 2004.
- Clark, William B. Captain Dauntless: The Story of Nicholas Biddle of the Continental Navy. 1949.
- Clark, William B. Gallant John Barry. 1938.
- Ditmas, Charles A. Life and Services of Major General William Alexanser. 1920.
- Duer, William Alexander. The Life of William Alexander, Earl of Stirling, with Selections from His Correspondence. New York: Wiley & Putnam, 1847.
- Eliot, Jr., Ellsworth. The Patriotism of Joseph Reed. New Haven, Connecticut: Yale University Library, 1943.
- Ellis, Joseph J. Founding Brothers: The Revolutionary Generation. New York: Vintage Books, a division of Random House, Inc., 2002. ISBN 978-0-375-70524-3. First published by New York: Alfred A. Knopf, a division of Random House, Inc., 2000.
- English, Frederick. General Hugh Mercer: Forgotten Hero of the American Revolution. Lawrenceville, New Jersey: Princeton Academic Press, 1975.
- Fisher, Sydney George. The Struggle for American Independence. Philadelphia: J.B. Lippincott Company, 1908.
- Fiske, John. The American Revolution. Boston: Houghton Mifflin Company, 1891.
- Flexner, James Thomas. The Young Hamilton: A Biography. Boston, Massachusetts: Little, Brown, 1978.
- Flower, Milton E. John Dickinson: Conservative Revolutionary. Charlottesville, VA: Published for the Friends of the John Dickinson Mansion by the University Press of Virginia, 1983. ISBN 978-0-8139-0966-0.
- Forman, Samuel A. Dr. Joseph Warren: The Boston Tea Party, Bunker Hill, and the Birth of American Liberty. Gretna, LA: Pelican Publishing, 2012. ISBN 978-1-4556-1474-5.
- Fruchtman, Jr., Jack. Thomas Paine, Apostle of Freedom. New York: Four Walls Eight Windows, 1994.
- Gerlach, Donald R. Philip Schuyler and the American Revolution in New York, 1733–77. Lincoln Nebraska: 1964. OCLC 426095.
- Golway, Terry. Washington's General: Nathanael Greene and the Triumph of the American Revolution. Henry Holt, 2005.
- Graham, James. Life of General Daniel Morgan. New York: Derby & Jackson, 1856. OCLC 339077.
- Griffin, Martin I. J. Stephen Moylan: Muster-Master General, Secretary and Aide-de-Camp to Washington, Quartermaster-General, Colonel of Fourth Pennsylvania Light Dragoons, and Brigadier-General of the War for American Independence. Philadelphia, Pennsylvania: privately published, 1909.
- Hall, Charles S. Benjamin Tallmadge: Revolutionary Soldier and American Businessman. New York: Columbia University Press, 1943.
- Haller, Stephen E. William Washington: Cavalryman of the Revolution. Bowie, MD: Heritage Books, 2001. ISBN 978-0-7884-1803-7.
- Haw, James. John and Edward Rutledge of South Carolina. Athens, GA: University of Georgia Press, 1997. ISBN 978-0-8203-1859-2.
- Heitman, Francis B. Historical Register of Officers of the Continental Army During the War of the Revolution, April 1775 to December 1783. Washington, D.C.: Rare Book Shop Pub. Co., 1914. OCLC 607142784.
- Higginbotham, Don. Daniel Morgan: Revolutionary Rifleman. Chapel Hill, NC: University of North Carolina Press, 1979. ISBN 978-0-8078-1386-7. Originally published Chapel Hill: University of North Carolina Press, 1961.
- Howe, Jr., John R. The Changing Thought of John Adams. 1966.
- Hutson, James H. John Adams and the Diplomacy of the American Revolution. 1980.
- Kajencki, Francis C. Casimir Pulaski, Cavalry Commander of the American Revolution. El Paso, Texas: Southwest Polonia Press, 2001.
- Kaminski, John P. George Clinton: Yeoman Politician of the New Republic. Madison, WI: Madison House Publishers, Inc., 1993. ISBN 978-0-945612-17-9.
- Kauffman, Bill. Forgotten Founder, Drunken Prophet: The Life of Luther Martin. Wilmington, Delaware: ISI Books, 2008. ISBN 978-1-933859-73-6.
- Mahoney, Henry Thayer and Marjorie Locke Mahoney. Gallantry in Action: A Biographic Dictionary of Espionage in the American Revolutionary War.. Lanham, Maryland: University Press of America, Inc., 1999. ISBN 978-0-7618-1479-5.
- Martyn, Charles. The Life of Artemas Ward, the First Commander-in-Chief of the American Revolution. New York: Artemas Ward, 1921.
- Mattern, David. Benjamin Lincoln and the American Revolution. Columbia, SC: University of South Carolina Press, 1998. ISBN 978-1-57003-260-8.
- Mayer, Henry. A Son of Thunder: Patrick Henry and the American Revolution. New York: Grove Press, 2001. First published in 1986 by Franklin Watts. ISBN 978-0-8021-3815-6.
- Mayers, Robert A. The War Man: The True Story of a Citizen-Soldier Who Fought from Quebec to Yorktown. Yardley, PA: Westholme Publishing LLC, 2009. ISBN 978-1-59416-082-0.
- McGrath, Tim. John Barry: An American in the Age of Sail. Yardley, PA: Westholme Publishing, LLC, 2010. ISBN 1-59416-104-6.
- McCullough, David. John Adams. ISBN 978-1-4165-7588-7. New York: Simon & Schuster Paperbacks, 2008. First published by Simon & Schuster, Inc., 2001.
- Mintz, Max M. The Generals of Saratoga: John Burgoyne and Horatio Gates. Yale University Press, 1990. ISBN 978-0300047783.
- Mitchell, Broadus. Alexander Hamilton: The Revolutionary Years. New York: Thomas Y. Crowell Company, 1970. OCLC 73548.
- Murchison, William. The Cost of Liberty: The Life of John Dickinson. Wilmington, DE: ISI Books, 2013. ISBN 978-1-933859-94-1.
- Nelson, Craig. Thomas Paine: Enlightenment, Revolution and the Birth of Modern Nations. New York: Penguin Books, 2006. ISBN 978-0-14-311238-9.
- Nelson, Paul David. General Horatio Gates: A Biography. Baton Rouge, Louisiana: Louisiana State University Press, 1976. ISBN 978-0-8071-0159-9.
- Nelson, Paul David. William Alexander, Lord Stirling. University of Alabama Press, 1987. ISBN 978-0817302832.
- Newcomb, Benjamin H. Franklin and Galloway: A Political Partnership. New Haven, Connecticut: Yale University Press, 1972.
- Norman, Jesse. Edmund Burke: The First Conservative. New York: Basic Books, 2013. ISBN 978-0-465-05897-6.
- Oberholtzer, Ellis Paxson. Robert Morris: Patriot and Financier. New York: Macmillan Company, 1903. OCLC 657137
- Oller, John. The Swamp Fox: How Francis Marion Saved the American Revolution. Boston: Da Capo Press, 2016. ISBN 978-0-306-82457-9.
- Patterson, Samuel White. Horatio Gates: Defender of American Liberties. New York: 1941. OCLC 5748493.
- Pickering, Octavius. The Life of Timothy Pickering. Boston: Little, Brown and Company, 1867.
- Posey, John Thorton. General Thomas Posey: Son of the American Revolution. East Lansing, Michigan: Michigan State University Press, 1992.
- Puls, Mark. Samuel Adams: Father of the American Revolution. New York: Palgrave Macmillan, 2006. ISBN 1-4039-7582-5.
- Randall, Willard Sterne. Ethan Allen: His Life and Times. New York: W. W. Norton Company, Inc., 2011. ISBN 978-0-393-07665-3.
- Rappleye, Charles. Robert Morris: Financier of the American Revolution. New York: Simon & Schuster, 2010. ISBN 978-1-4165-7091-2.
- Roche, John F. Joseph Reed: A Moderate in the American Revolution. New York: Columbia University Press, 1957
- Rose, Ben Z. John Stark: Maverick General. Waverley, MA: TreeLine Press, 2007. ISBN 978-0-9789123-0-7.
- Rossman, Kenneth R. Thomas Mifflin and the Politics of the American Revolution. Chapel Hill, North Carolina: University of North Carolina Press, 1952.
- Rutland, Robert A. James Madison: The Founding Father New York: Macmillan Publishing Co., 1987. ISBN 978-0-02-927601-3.
- Schaeper, Thomas J. Edward Bancroft: Scientist, Author, Spy. New Haven, London: Yale University Press, 2011. ISBN 978-0-300-11842-1.
- Schumacker, Ludwig. Earl of Sterling. 1897.
- Shaw, Peter. The Character of John Adams. 1976.
- Shelton, Hal T. General Richard Montgomery and the American Revolution: From Redcoat to Rebel. New York: New York University Press, 1996. ISBN 978-0-8147-8039-8.
- Shrere, L.G. Tench Tilghman: The Life and Times of Washington's Aide-de-Camp. Centreville, Maryland: Tidewater, 1982.
- Smith, Jean Edward. John Marshall: Definer of a Nation. New York: Henry Holt & Company, LLC, 1996. ISBN 978-0-8050-5510-8.
- Smith, Page. John Adams, two volumes. 1962.
- Smith, William Henry, ed. The Life and Public Services of Arthur St. Clair, Soldier of the Revolutionary War, President of the Continental Congress, and Governor of the Northwestern Territory: Correspondence and Others Papers, Arranged and Annotated. Cincinnati, Ohio: Robert Clarke, 1881.
- Starr, Walter. John Jay. New York: Hambledon Continuum, 2006. Copyright 2005. ISBN 978-0-8264-1879-1.
- Stephens, Karl F. Neither the Charm Nor the Luck: Major-General John Sullivan. Denver: Outskirts Press, 2009. ISBN 978-1-4327-4228-7.
- Stoll, Ira. Samuel Adams: A Life. New York: Free Press, a division of Simon & Schuster, Inc., 2008. ISBN 978-0-7432-9911-4.
- Storozynski, Alex. The Peasant Prince: Thaddeus Kosciuszko and the Age of Revolution. New York: Thomas Dunne Books, an imprint of St. Martin's Press, 2009. ISBN 978-0-312-38802-7.
- Rubin Stuart, Nancy. The Muse of the Revolution: The Secret Pen of Mercy Otis Warren and the Founding of a Nation. Boston: Beacon Press, 2008. ISBN 978-0-8070-5517-5.
- Toth, Michael C. Founding Federalist: The Life of Oliver Ellsworth. Wilmington, DE: ISI Books, 2011. ISBN 978-1-935191-16-2.
- Unger, Harlow Giles. Lafayette. Hoboken, NJ: John Wiley & Sons, Inc., 2002. ISBN 978-0-471-46885-1.
- Unger, Harlow Giles. The Last Founding Father: James Monroe and A Nation's Call to Greatness. Philadelphia: DaCapo Press, 2009. ISBN 978-0-306-81808-0.
- Upham, Charles W. Life of Timothy Pickering. Boston, Massachusetts: Little, Brown and Company, 1873. OCLC 18825503.
- Valentine. Lord Sterling. 1969.
- Van Vlack, Milton C. Silas Deane, Revolutionary War Diplomat and Politician. Jefferson, North Carolina: McFarland & Company, Inc., 2013. ISBN 978-0-7864-7252-9.
- Ward, Harry M. General William Maxwell and the New Jersey Continentals. Westport, Connecticut: Greenwood Press, 1997. ISBN 978-0-313-30432-3.
- Zucker, Adolf Eduard. General De Kalb: Lafayette's Mentor. Chapel Hill: University of North Carolina Press, 1966. OCLC 1045684.

==== Benedict Arnold ====
- Arnold, Isaac N. Life of Benedict Arnold, His Patriotism and Treason. Chicago, Illinois: Jansen, McClug & Company, 1880. OCLC 1343644.
- Boylan, Brian R. Benedict Arnold. 1973.
- Brandt, Clare. The Man in the Mirror: A Life of Benedict Arnold. New York: Random House, 1994.
- Martin, James Kirby. Benedict Arnold Revolutionary. New York: New York University Press, 1997. ISBN 978-0-8147-5560-0.
- Randall, Willard Sterne. Benedict Arnold: Patriot and Traitor. New York: Morrow, 1990. ISBN 978-1-55710-034-4.
- Sellers, Charles Coleman. Benedict Arnold: The Proud Warrior New York: Minton, Balch & Company, 1930.
- Thompson, Ray. Benedict Arnold in Philadelphia. Bicentennial Press, 1975.
- Wallace, Willard. Traitorous Hero: The Life and Fortunes of Benedict Arnold. New York: Harper & Brothers, 1954.
- Wilson, Barry K. Benedict Arnold: A Traitor in Our Midst. McGill–Queen's University, 2001.

==== Aaron Burr ====
- Hecht, Marie B. Aaron Burr, Portrait of an Ambitious Man. 1967.
- Lomask, Milton. Aaron Burr: The Years from Princeton to Vice President, 1756–1805. New York: Farrar–Straus–Giroux, 1979.
- Merwin, Henry Childs. Aaron Buur. Boston, Massachusetts: Small, Maynard & Company, 1899.
- Parton, James. The Life and Times of Aaron Burr, two volumes. 1858.
- Stewart, David O. American Emperor: Aaron Burr's Challenge to Jefferson's America. New York: Simon & Schuster, 2011. ISBN 978-1-4391-5718-3.
- Wandell, Samuel H. and Meade Minnigerode. Aaron Burr, two volumes. New York: G.P. Putnam's Sons, 1925.

==== Benjamin Franklin ====
- Allison, Andrew M. The Real Benjamin Franklin: The True Story of America's Greatest Diplomat. United States: National Center for Constitutional Studies, 2008. ISBN 978-0-88080-001-3. First published 1982. Part II Timeless Treasures from Benjamin Franklin (selections from his writings) selected by W. Cleon Skousen and Richard M. Maxfield.
- Anderson, Douglas. The Unfinished Life of Benjamin Franklin. Baltimore: The Johns Hopkins University Press, 2012. ISBN 978-1-4214-0523-0.
- Brands, H. W. The First American: The Life and Times of Benjamin Franklin. New York: Anchor Books, a Division of Random House, Inc., 2002. ISBN 978-0-385-49540-0. Originally published by New York: Doubleday, a division of Random House, Inc., 2000.
- Isaacson, Walter. Benjamin Franklin: An American Life. New York: Simon & Schuster Paperbacks, 2004. First published Simon & Schuster, Inc., 2003. ISBN 978-0-7432-5807-4.
- Van Doren, Carl. Benjamin Franklin. New York: Viking, 1938.
- Wright, Esmond. Franklin of Philadelphia. Cambridge, Massachusetts: Harvard University Press, 1997.

==== Nathanael Greene ====
- Carbone, Gerald M. Nathanael Greene: A Biography of the American Revolution. New York: Palgrave Macmillan division of St. Martin's Press, LLC, 2008. ISBN 978-0-230-60271-7.
- Golway, Terry. Washington's General: Nathanael Green and the Triumph of the American Revolution. New York: Henry Holt & Company, 2006. ISBN 978-0-8050-8005-6.
- Simms, W. Gilmore, ed. The Life of Nathanael Greene. New York: George F. Cooledge and Bros., 1849.
- Thayer, Theodore. Nathanael Greene: Strategist of the American Revolution. New York: Twayne Publishers, 1960.

==== John Hancock ====
- Fowler, Jr., William. The Baron of Beacon Hill: A Biography of John Hancock. Boston, Massachusetts: Houghton Mifflin: 1980.
- Unger, Harlow Giles. John Hancock: Merchant King and American Patriot. Edison, New Jersey: Castle Books, 2005. ISBN 978-0-7858-2026-0. Originally published Hoboken, NJ: John Wiley & Sons, Inc., 2000.

==== Thomas Jefferson ====
- Ellis, Joseph J. American Sphinx: The Character of Thomas Jefferson. New York: Vintage Books, A Division of Random House, 1998. First published in hardcover, 1996. ISBN 978-0-679-44490-9.
- Kranish, Michael. Flight from Monticello: Thomas Jefferson at War. Oxford, New York: Oxford University Press, 2010. ISBN 978-0-19-537462-9.
- Malone, Dumas. Jefferson the Virginian. Boston: Little, Brown & Co., 1948. OCLC 1823927.
- Malone, Dumas. Jefferson and the Rights of Man. Boston: Little, Brown & Co., 1951. OCLC 23987651.
- Malone, Dumas. Jefferson and the Ordeal of Liberty. Boston: Little, Brown & Co., 1962. OCLC 1856804.
- Malone, Dumas. Jefferson the President: First Term, 1801–1805. Boston: Little, Brown & Co., 1970. OCLC 4314946. ISBN 978-0-316-54467-2.
- Malone, Dumas. Jefferson the President: Second Term, 1805–1809. Boston: Little, Brown & Co., 1974. OCLC 1929523.
- Malone, Dumas. Jefferson and His Time: The Sage of Monticello. Boston: Little, Brown & Co., 1981. OCLC 7564241. ISBN 978-0-316-54463-4.
- Meacham, Jon. Thomas Jefferson: The Art of Power. New York: Random House, 2012. ISBN 978-1-4000-6766-4.
- Risjord, Norman K. (1991). Jefferson's America, 1760–1815. Madison : Madison House. ISBN 978-1-4422-0052-4.
- Risjord, Norman (1994). Thomas Jefferson. Rowman & Littlefield. ISBN 978-0-945612-39-1.

==== John Paul Jones ====
- Boudriot, Jean. John Paul Jones and the Bonhomme Richard. Naval Institute Press, 1987.
- Feld, Jonathan (2017). John Paul Jones's Locker: The Mutinous Men of the Continental Ship Ranger and the Confinement of Lieutenant Thomas Simpson, Naval History and Heritage Command, 36 pages. ISBN 978-1-943604-22-7,
- Morison, Samuel E. John Paul Jones: A Sailor's Biography. 1959.
- Thomas, Evans. John Paul Jones: Sailor, Hero, Father of the American Navy . Simon & Schuster, 2004. ISBN 978-0-7432-5804-3.

==== Henry Knox ====
- Brooks, Noah. Henry Knox: A Soldier of the Revolution. New York: G.P. Putnam's Sons, 1900.
- Callahan, North. Henry Knox: General Washington's General. South Brunswick, Maine: A.S. Barnes & Co., 1958.
- Drake, Francis S. Life and Correspondence of Henry Knox, Major-General in the American Revolutionary Army. Boston: Samuel G. Drake, 1873.
- Griffiths, Thomas Morgan. Major General Henry Knox and the Last heirs to Montpelier. Monmouth, Maine: Monmouth Press, 1965.
- Puls, Mark. Henry Knox: Visionary General of the American Revolution. New York: Palgrave Macmillan, 2008. ISBN 978-0-230-62388-0.

==== Henry Lee ====
- Hartmann, John W. The American Partisan: Henry Lee and the Struggle for Independence. Shippensburg, Pennsylvania: Burd Street Press, 2000
- Pechuch, Jim and John Beakes. Light Horse Harry Lee in the American Revolution. Charleston, South Carolina: Nautical & Aviation Publishing, 2012.
- Royster, Charles. Light Horse Harry Lee and the Legacy of the American Revolution. New York: Knopf: Distributed by Random House, 1981. ISBN 978-0-394-51337-9.

==== Francis Marion ====
- Bass, Robert D. Swamp Fox: The life and campaigns of General Francis Marion. Orangeburg, SC: Sandlapper Publishing Co., 1974. ISBN 978-0-87844-051-1. Originally published New York: Henry Holt and Company, 1959.
- Oller, John. The Swamp Fox: How Francis Marion Saved the American Revolution. Boston: Da Capo Press, 2016. ISBN 978-0-306-82457-9.
- Rankin, Hugh. Francis Marion: The Swamp Fox. New York: Crowell, 1973. ISBN 978-0-690-00097-9.
- Simms, W. Gilmore. The Life of Francis Marion. Philadelphia, Pennsylvania. G.G. Evans, Publisher, 1860. OCLC 3057684.

==== Israel Putnam ====
- Cutter, William. The Life of Israel Putnam, Major General in the Army of the American Revolution. Boston, Massachusetts: Sanborn, Carter, Bazin & Co., 1846.
- Drake, Samuel Adams. General Israel Putnam: The Commander at Bunker Hill. Boston, Massachusetts: Nichols & Hall, 1875.
- Hill, George Canning. Gen. Israel Putnam: "Old Put", a Biography. Boston, Massachusetts: E.O. Libby & Co., 1858.
- Humphreys, David. An Essay on the Life of the Honourable Major-General Isaac Putnam. Indianapolis, Indiana: Library Fund, 2000.
- Humphreys, David. The Life, Anecdotes, and Heroic Exploits of Israel Putnam. Cleveland, Ohio: M.C. Younglove & Co., 1849.
- Putnam, Alfred P. A Sketch of Israel Putnam. Salem, Massachusetts: Eben Putnam, 1893.

==== Friedrich Wilhelm von Steuben ====
- Lockhart, Paul. The Drillmaster of Valley Forge: The Baron de Steuben and the Making of the American Army. New York: HarperCollins, 2008. ISBN 978-0-06-145163-8.

==== George Washington ====
- Brookhiser, Richard. Founding Father: Rediscovering George Washington. New York: Free Press, 1996. ISBN 978-0-684-82291-4.
- Chernow, Ron. Washington: A Life. New York: The Penguin Press, 2010. ISBN 978-1-59420-266-7.
- Cunliffe, Marcus. George Washington: Man and Monument. New York: New American Library, 1958.
- Custis, George Washington Parke. Recollections and Private Memoirs of Washington. New York: Derby & Jackson, 1860.
- Ellis, Joseph J. His Excellency George Washington. New York: Alford A. Knopf, 2004. ISBN 978-1-4000-4031-5.
- Ferling, John. The First of Men: A Life of George Washington. Knoxville: University of Tennessee Press, 1988. ISBN 978-0-87049-562-5.
- Flexner, James Thomas. George Washington in the American Revolution. Boston: Little, Brown, 1968. OCLC 400924.
- Flexner, James Thomas. George Washington: The Forge of Experience, 1732–1775. Boston, Massachusetts: Little, Brown, 1965.
- Flexner, James Thomas. Washington: The Indispensable Man. New York: Back Bay Books/Little, Brown and Company, 1974. ISBN 978-0-316-28616-9. First published: Boston: Little, Brown and Company, 1969.
- Freeman, Douglas Southall. George Washington: A Biography. 7 volumes. New York: Charles Scribner's Sons, 1948–1957. OCLC 425613.
- Freeman, Douglas Southall. An Abridgement by Richard Harwell of the 7-Volume Biography. Washington. New York: Touchstone, 1995. ISBN 978-0-684-82637-0. First published by Charles Scribner's Sons, 1968.
- Frothingham, Thomas G. Washington: Commander in Chief. Boston, Massachusetts: Houghton Mifflin, 1930.
- Henriques, Peter R. Realistic Visionary: A Portrait of George Washington. Charlottesville, Virginia: University of Virginia Press, 2006. ISBN 978-0-8139-2547-9.
- Higginbotham, Don. George Washington and the American Military Tradition. Athens, Georgia: University of Georgia Press, 1985. ISBN 978-0-8203-0786-2.
- Higginbotham, Don, ed. George Washington Reconsidered. Charlottesville, VA: University of Virginia Press, 2001. ISBN 978-0-8139-2005-4.
- Higginbotham, Don. George Washington: United a Nation. Lanham, Maryland: Rowman & Littlefield Publishers, 2002.
- Hirschfield, Fritz. George Washington and Slavery. Columbia, Missouri: University of Missouri Press, 1997.
- Humphreys, David. Life of General Washington. Athens, Georgia: University of Georgia Press, 1991.
- Johnston, Elizabeth Bryant. George Washington Day by Day. New York: Baker & Taylor Co., 1895.
- Ketchum, Richard M. The World of George Washington. New York: American Heritage, 1974.
- Legnel, Edward G. General George Washington: A Military Life. New York: Random House, 2005. ISBN 978-1-4000-6081-8.
- Marshall, John. The Life of George Washington, Commander-in-Chief of the American Revolution, two volumes. Philadelphia, Pennsylvania: C.P. Wayne, 1804.
- Morgan, Edmund S. The Genius of George Washington. New York: Norton, 1977.
- Ramsay, David. Life of George Washington. Ithaca, New York: Mack, Andrus & Woodruff, 1840.
- Rasmussen, William M.S. and Robert S. Tilton. George Washington: The Man Behind the Myths. Charlottesville, Virginia: University of Virginia Press, 1999.
- Unger, Harlow Giles. The Unexpected George Washington: His Private Life. Hoboken, NJ: John Wiley & Sons, Inc., 2006. ISBN 978-0-471-74496-2.
- Wick, Wendy C. George Washington, an American Icon: The Eighteenth-Century Graphic Portraits. Washington, D.C.: Smithsonian Institution Traveling Exhibition Service and the National Portrait Gallery, 1982.

==== Anthony Wayne ====
- Moore, H.N. Life and Services of Gen. Anthony Wayne. Philadelphia, Pennsylvania: John B. Perry, 1845. OCLC 3366531.
- Nelson, Paul David. Anthony Wayne: Soldier of the Early Republic. Bloomington, Indiana: Indiana University Press, 1985. ISBN 978-0-253-30751-4.
- Stille, Charles J. Major General Anthony Wayne and the Pennsylvania Line in the Continental Army. Philadelphia: J. B. Lippincott Company, 1893. OCLC 504757713.
- Wildes, Harry Emerson. Anthony Wayne: Trouble Shooter of the American Revolution. Westport, Connecticut: Greenwood Press, 1970. OCLC 469865896.

=== French biographies ===
- Gottschalk, Louis. Lafayette and the Close of the American Revolution. Chicago: University of Chicago Press, 1942.
- Lewis, Charles Lee. Admiral de Grasse and American Independence. Annapolis, Maryland: United States Naval Institute, 1945.
- Unger, Harlow Giles. Lafayette. Hoboken, New Jersey: John Wiley & Sons, Inc., 2002. ISBN 978-0-471-46885-1.
- Vail, Jini Jones. Rochambeau: Washington's Ideal Lieutenant: A French General's Role in the American Revolution. Tarentum, Pennsylvania: Word Association Publishers, 2011. ISBN 978-1-59571-602-6.
- Whitridge, Arnold. Rochambeau. New York: Macmillan, 1965.

== Soldiers and prisoners ==
- Bolton, Charles Knowles. The Private Soldier Under Washington. Port Washington, New York: Kennikat Press, 1964.
- Borick, Carl P. Relieve Us of This Burthen: American Prisoners of War in the Revolutionary South, 1780–1782. Charleston: University of South Carolina Press, 2012. ISBN 978-1-61117-039-9.
- Bowman, Larry G. Captive Americans: Prisoners During the American Revolution. Athens, OH: Ohio University Press, 1976. ISBN 978-0-8214-0215-3.
- Burrows, Edwin G. Forgotten Patriots: The Untold Story of American Prisoners During the Revolutionary War. New York: Basic Books, 2008. ISBN 978-0-465-00835-3.
- Chartrand, Rene. The French Soldier in Colonial America. 1984.
- Frey, Silvia R. The British Soldier in America: A Social History of Military Life in the Revolutionary Period. 1981.
- Gross, Robert A. The Minutemen and Their World. 1976.
- Merlant, Joachim. Soldiers and Sailors of France in the America War for Independence. 1920.
- Metzger, Charles H. The Prisoner in the American Revolution. 1971.
- Milsop, John. Continental Infantryman of the American Revolution. 2004.
- Neimeyer, Charles Patrick. America Goes to War: A Social History of the Continental Army (1995) complete text online
- Peterson, Harold L. The Book of the Continental Soldier. Harrisburg, Pennsylvania: Stackpole Co., 1968.
- Reid, Stuart, and Marko Zlatich. Soldiers of the Revolutionary War. 2002.

== Politics ==
- Boyd, Julian P. The Articles of Confederation and Perpetual Union. 1966.
- Brown, Gerald Saxon. The American Secretary: The Colonial Policy of Lord George Germain, 1775–1778. Ann Arbor, MI: University of Michigan Press, 1963. OCLC 399107.
- Burnett, Edmund C. The Continental Congress. New York: Macmillan Co., 1941. OCLC 1467233.
- Donoughue, Bernard. British Politics and the American Revolution: The Path to War, 1773-75. London, Macmillan; New York, St. Martin's Press, 1964. OCLC 426617.
- Lefer, David. The Founding Conservatives: How a Group of Unsung Heroes Saved the American Revolution. New York: Penguin Group, 2013. ISBN 978-1-59523-069-0.
- Maier, Pauline. American Scripture: Making the Declaration of Independence. New York: Knopf, 1997.
- McDonald Forrest. E Pluribus Unum: The Formation of the American Republic, 1776–1790. 1965.
- Montross, Lynn. The Reluctant Rebels: The Story of the Continental Congress, 1774–1789. New York: Barnes & Noble, 1950.
- Ritcheson, Charles R. British Politics and the American Revolution. Westport, Connecticut: Greenwood Press, 1981.
- Rothbard, Murray, Conceived in Liberty (2011), Volume III: Advance to Revolution, 1760–1775 and Volume IV: The Revolutionary War, 1775–1784. ISBN 978-1-933550-98-5, OCLC 810280385
- Patterson, Stephen E. Political Parties in Revolutionary Massachusetts. 1973.
- Shmizzi, Ernest and Gregory. The Staten Island Peace Conference, September 11, 1776. Albany, New York: New York State Bicentennial Commission, 1976. OCLC 2843025.

=== Diplomacy ===
- Bemis, Samuel Flagg. The Diplomacy of the American Revolution. New York: 1935. OCLC 491725. Several reprintings.
- Corwin, Edward S. French Policy and the American Alliance of 1778. New York: 1916. OCLC 187156641.
- Dull, Jonathan. A Diplomatic History of the American Revolution. New Haven, CT: 1983. ISBN 978-0-300-03419-6.
- Wharton, Francis. Revolutionary Diplomatic Correspondence of the United States, six volumes. Washington, D.C.: 1882. OCLC 493244.

== Women, minorities, and religious groups ==
- Blumenthal, Walter Hart. Women Camp Followers of the American Revolution. Philadelphia: George S. MacManus Co., 1952.
- Booth, Sally Smith. The Women of '76. New York: Hastings House, 1984. ISBN 978-0-8038-8066-5.
- Cuckley, Gail. American Patriots: The Story of Blacks in the Military from the Revolution to Desert Storm. New York: Random House, 2001.
- Buel, Joy Day and Richard, Jr. The Way of Duty: A Woman and Her Family in Revolutionary American. New York: W. W. Norton, 1984. ISBN 978-0-393-01767-0.
- Cleary, Patricia. Elizabeth Murray: A Woman's Pursuit of Independence in Eighteenth-Century America. Amherst, MA: University of Massachusetts Press, 2000. ISBN 978-1-55849-263-9.
- Diamant, Lincoln. Revolutionary Women in the War for American Independence. Westport, Connecticut: Praeger, 1998.
- Ellet, Elizabeth F. The Women of the American Revolution, three volumes. Philadelphia, Pennsylvania: George W. Jacobs & Co., 1900.
- Evans, Elizabeth. Weathering the Storm: Women of the American Revolution. New York: Scribners, 1975. ISBN 978-0-684-13953-1.
- Foner, Philip. Blacks in the American Revolution. Westport, CT: Greenwood Press, 1976. ISBN 978-0-8371-8946-8.
- Frey, Silvia R. Water from the Rock: Black Resistance in the Revolutionary Age. 1991.
- Gilbert, Alan. Black Patriots and Loyalists: Fighting for Emancipation in the War for Independence. (U of Chicago Press, 2012). ISBN 978-0-226-29307-3.
- Graymont, Barbara. The Iroquois in the American Revolution. 1972.
- Hartgrove, W. B. "The Negro Soldier in the American Revolution" Journal of Negro History 1#2 (1916) pp. 110–131 online
- Kerber, Linda K. Women of the Republic: Intellect and Ideology in Revolutionary America (New York: W.W. Norton, 1986) ISBN 978-0393303452
- Knoblock, Glenn A. "Strong and Brave Fellows": New Hampshire's Black Soldiers and Sailors of the American Revolution, 1775–1784. (McFarland, 2003). ISBN 978-0-7864-1548-9.
- McKeel, Arthur J. The Relation of the Quakers to the American Revolution. Washington, D.C.: University Press of America, Inc., 1979. ISBN 978-0-8191-0792-3.
- Merritt, Jane T. "Native Peoples in the Revolutionary War" in The Oxford Handbook of the American Revolution ed. by Jane Kamensky and Edward G. Gray (2012) doi:10.1093/oxfordhb/9780199746705.013.0014
- O'Donnell III, James H. Southern Indians in the American Revolution. 1973.
- Pearsall, Sarah M. S. "Women in the American Revolutionary War" in The Oxford Handbook of the American Revolution ed. by Jane Kamensky and Edward G. Gray. (2012) doi:10.1093/oxfordhb/9780199746705.013.0016
- Pingeon, Francis D. Blacks in the Revolutionary Era. Trenton, New Jersey: New Jersey Historical Commission, 1975. OCLC 2202420.
- Quarles, Benjamin. The Negro in the Revolution. Chapel Hill, North Carolina: University of North Carolina Press, 1961. ISBN 978-0-8078-0833-7.
- Walling, Richard. Men of Color at the Battle of Monmouth, June 28, 1778. Highstown, New Jersey: Longstreet House, 1994. ISBN 978-0-944413-29-6.

=== Books For Children ===
- Brennan, Linda Crotta. The Black Regiment of the American Revolution. North Kingstown, R.I.: Moon Mountain Publishing, 2004. ISBN 1-931659-06-0
- Roberts, Cookie. Founding Mothers: Remembering the Ladies. New York: Harper, 2014. ISBN 978-0-06-078002-9
- Wallner, Alexandra. Betsy Ross. New York: Holiday House, 1994. ISBN 0-8234-1071-4

== Loyalists ==
- Brown, Wallace. The Good Americans: The Loyalists in the American Revolution. 1969.
- Brown, Wallace and Hereward Senior. Victorious in Defeat: The American Loyalists in Exile. 1984.
- Calhoon. Robert McCluer. The Loyalists in Revolutionary America, 1760–1781. 1973.
- Jasanoff, Maya. Liberty's Exiles: American Loyalists in the Revolutionary World. New York: Knopf, 2011. ISBN 978-1-4000-4168-8.
- Ranlet, Philip. The New York Loyalists. 1986.
- Ryan, Dennis P. New Jersey's Loyalists. Trenton, New Jersey: New Jersey Historical Commission, 1975. OCLC 2202545.

== Primary sources ==
- Albion, Robert Greenhalgh and Leonidas Dodson, eds. Philip Vickers Fithian: Journal, 1775–1776, Written on the Virginia-Pennsylvania Frontier and in the Army Around New York. Princeton University Press, 1934.
- Balderston, Marion, and David Syrett, editors. The Lost War: Letters from British Officers during the American Revolution. 1975.
- Barnes, James and Patience Barnes, eds. The American Revolution Through British Eyes: A Documentary Collection. Kent, OH: Kent State University Press, 2012. ISBN 978-1-60635-111-6.
- Bolton, Charles Knowles, ed. The Letters of Hugh Earl Percy from Boston to New York: 1774–1776. Boston, Massachusetts: Gregg Press, 1972.
- Boyle, Joseph Lee. Writings from the Valley Forge Encampment of the Continental Army: December 19, 1777 –June 19, 1778, two volumes. Bowie, Maryland: Heritage Books, Inc., 2001.
- Bray, Robert C., and Paul E. Bushnell, editors. Diary of a Common Soldier in the American Revolution, 1775–1783: An Annotated Edition of the Military Journal of Jereiah Greenman. 1978.
- Burgoyne, Bruce E. Ansbach–Bayreuth Diaries from the American Revolution. Bowie, Maryland: Heritage Books, Inc., 1999.
- Burgoyne, Bruce E. Enemy Views: The American Revolutionary War as Recorded by the Hessian Participants. Bowie, Maryland: Heritage Books, Inc., 1996.
- Carpenter, Dorr Bradley, ed. Stephen R. Bradley: Letters of a Revolutionary War Patriot and Vermont Senator. Jefferson, North Carolina: McFarland & Company, Inc., 2009. ISBN 978-0-7864-3358-2.
- Commager, Henry Steele and Richard B. Morris, eds. The Spirit of 'Seventy-Six': The Story of the American Revolution as told by Participants. New York: Da Capo Press, 1995. ISBN 978-0-306-80620-9. Originally published: Indianapolis: Bobbs-Merrill, 1958. online
- Corner, George W., ed. The Autobiography of Benjamin Rush: His Travels Through Life, Together with His 'Commonplace Book' for 1789–1813. Westport, Connecticut: Greenwood Press, 1970.
- Crary, Catherine S. The Price of Loyalty: Tory Writings from the Revolutionary Era. New York: McGraw-Hill, 1973.
- Dann, John C., ed. The Revolution Remembered: Eyewitness Accounts of the War for Independence. University of Chicago Press, 1980.
- Ewald, Johann. Diary of the American War: A Hessian Journal, Captain Johann Ewald, Field Jaeger Corps. New Haven, Connecticut: Yale University Press, 1979.
- Gruber, Ira D., ed. John Peebles' American War: The Diary of a Scottish Grenadier, 1776–1782. Mechanicsburg, Pennsylvania: Stackpole Books, 1998.
- Hammond, Otis G., ed. Letter and Papers of Major–General John Sullivan, Continental Army. Concord, New Hampshire: New Hampshire Historical Society, 1930.
- Hayes, John T., editor. A Gentleman of Fortune: The Diary of Baylor Hill, First Continental Light Dragoons, 1777–1781, three volumes. Fort Lauderdale, Florida: Saddlebag Press, 1995.
- Kemble, Stephen. Journals of Lieut. Col. Stephen Kemble. (Gregg Press, 1972).
- Kipplin, Ernest and Samuel Stelle Smith, translators. At General Howe's Side 1776–1778: The diary of General William Howe's Aide de Camp, Captain Friederich von Muenchhausen. Monmouth Beach: Philip Freneau Press, 1974.
- Quinch, Josiah, ed. The Journals of Major Samuel Shaw. Boston, Massachusetts: Wm. Crosby and H. P. Nichols, 1847.
- Rhodehamel, John, ed. The American Revolution: Writings from the War of Independence 1775–1783. New York: Library of America, 2001.
- Saberton, Ian, editor. The Cornwallis Papers: The Campaigns of 1780 and 1781 in the Southern Theatre of the American Revolutionary War, six volumes. Uckfield, East Sussex, U.K.: Naval & Military Press, 2010.
- Sabine, W.H.W., ed. The New York Diary of Lieutenant Jabez Fitch of the 17th (Connecticut) Regiment from August 2, 1776, to December 15, 1777. New York: Colvurn & Tegg, 1954.
- Scheer, George F. and Hugh F. Rankin. Rebels and Redcoats: The American Revolution through the Eyes of Those Who Fought and Lived It. Cleveland, Ohio: World Publishing, 1957. New York: Da Capo, 1987. ISBN 978-0-306-80307-9.
- Showman, Richard K., ed. The Papers of General Nathanael Greene. Chapel Hill, North Carolina: University of North Carolina Press, 1980, 1998.
- Willard, Margaret Wheeler, ed. Letters on the American Revolution, 1774–1776. Boston, Massachusetts: Houghton Mifflin, 1925.

=== Memoirs ===
- Frazer, Persifor. General Persifor Frazer, A Memoir. Philadelphia, Pennsylvania: no publisher listed, 1907. OCLC 51721794.
- Lee, Henryl Memoirs of the War in the Southern Department of the United States. Philadelphia: Bradford and Inskeep, 1812.
- Martin, Joseph Plumb. A Narrative of Some of the Adventures, Dangers and Sufferings of a Revolutionary Soldier. Hallowell, Maine: 1830. Reprinted: New York, Arno Press, 1967. OCLC 472514340.
- Purdon, H. G. Memoirs of the Services of the 64th Regiment (Second Straffordshire). Strafford, England: W. H. Allen & Co., 1882. OCLC 4079098.
- Sizer, Theodore, ed. The Autobiography of Colonel John Trumbull. New York: Da Capo Press, 1970.

== Other ==
- Boatner, Mark M. Encyclopedia of the American Revolution. 1966.
- Boatner, Mark M. Landmarks of the American Revolution. 1973.
- Bodle, Wayne K. The Valley Forge Winter: Civilians and Soldiers in War. 2002.
- Chartrand, Rene. Forts of the American Revolution 1775–83. Oxford, U.K.: Osprey Publishing, 2016. ISBN 978-1-4728-1445-6.
- Collins, Varnum Lansing, ed. A Brief Narrative of the Ravages of the British and Hessians at Princeton, 1776–1777. Princeton, New Jersey: University Library, 1999.
- Cox, Caroline. A Proper Sense of Honor: Service and Sacrifice in George Washington's Army. Chapel Hill, North Carolina: University of North Carolina Press, 2004.
- Decker, Malcolm. Ten Days of Infamy. 1969.
- Farrier, George H., ed. Memorial of the Centennial Celebration of the Battle of Paulus Hook, August 19th, 1879, with a History of the Early Settlement and Present Condition of Jersey City, NJ. Jersey City: M. Mullone, 1879.
- Fischer, David Hackett. Paul Revere's Ride. New York: Oxford University Press, 1994.
- Gelbert, Doug. American Revolutionary War Sites, Memorials, Museums and Library Collections: A State-by-State Guidebook to Places Open to the Public. Jefferson, North Carolina: McFarland & Company, Inc., 2003. ISBN 978-0-7864-1696-7.
- Gould Dudley C. Times of Brother Jonathan: What He Ate, Drank, Wore, Believed In, and Used for Medicine During the War of Independence. 2001.
- Knollenberg, Bernhard. Washington and the Revolution, a Reappraisal: Gates, Conway, and the Continental Congress. New York: Macmillan, 1941. OCLC 747978.
- Kranish, Michael. Flight from Monticello: Thomas Jefferson at War. New York: Oxford University Press, 2010. ISBN 978-0-19-537462-9.
- Mayer, Holly A. Belonging to the Army: Camp Followers and Community during the American Revolution. Columbia, South Carolina: University of South Carolina Press, 1996.
- Mitchell, Joseph B. Discipline and Bayonets: The Armies and Leaders in the War of the American Revolution. 1967.
- Morris, Richard B. The Peacemakers: The Great Powers and American Independence. New York: Harper & Row, 1970. OCLC 221905807.
- Neumann, George C. and Frank J. Dravid. Collector's Illustrated Encyclopedia of the American Revolution. 1975.
- Norton, Mary Beth. The British–Americans: The Loyalists in England. Boston, Massachusetts: 1972. ISBN 978-0-316-61250-0.
- Perkins, James B. France in the American Revolution. 1970.
- Piecuch, Jim, editor. Cavalry of the American Revolution. Yardley, Pennsylvania: Westholm Publishing, 2012. ISBN 978-1-59416-154-4.
- Reich, Jerome R. British Friends of the American Revolution. Armonk, New York: M.E. Sharpe, 1998.
- Rhoden, Nancy L. and Ian K. Steele, eds. The Human Tradition in the American Revolution. Wilmington, Delaware: Scholarly Resources, 2000.
- Royster, Charles. A Revolutionary People at War: The Continental Army & American Character, 1775–1783. Chapel Hill, NC: The University of North Carolina Press, 1979. ISBN 978-0-8078-4606-3.
- Sabine, William H.W. Murder, 1776, and Washington's Policy of Silence. New York: Theo. Gaus' Sons, Inc., 1973.
- Salinger, Sharon V. Taverns and Drinking in Early America. Baltimore: Johns Hopkins University Press, 2002. ISBN 978-0-8018-7899-2.
- Smith, Gregg. Beer in America: The Early Years – 1587–1840: Beer's Role in the Settling of America and the Birth of a Nation. Boulder, CO: Siris Books, 1998. ISBN 978-0-937381-65-6.
- Steuben, Baron von. Baron von Stueben's Revolutionary War Drill Manual: A Facsimile Reprint of the 1794 Edition. New York: Dover, 1985.
- Thomson, Buchannon Parker. Spain: Forgotten Ally of the American Revolution. The Christopher Publishing House, 1976.

== See also ==
- List of bibliographies on American history
- Bibliography of George Washington
- Bibliography of Thomas Jefferson
- Bibliography of the War of 1812
