= Don Higginbotham =

American historian (1931–2008)

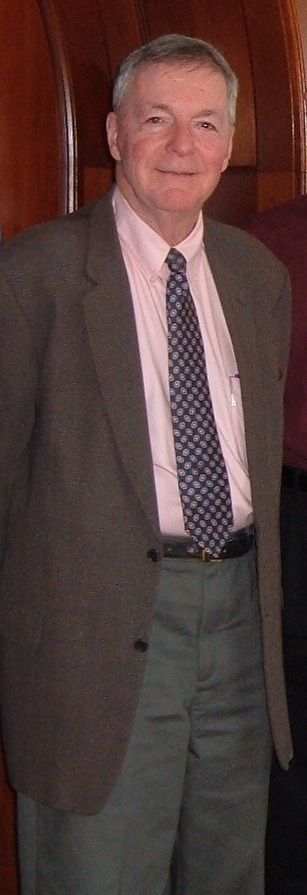
- Don Higginbotham in March 2007
- Born: May 22, 1931
- Died: June 22, 2008 (aged 77); Chapel Hill, North Carolina, USA
- Occupation: Professor
- Genre: History

Don Higginbotham (May 22, 1931 – June 22, 2008) was an American historian and Dowd Professor of History and Peace, War, and Defense at the University of North Carolina at Chapel Hill. A leading scholar of George Washington, he was a pioneering practitioner of the “new” military history and an expert on colonial and revolutionary America and the early national United States. He served twice (1975–76 and 1998–99) as visiting professor of history at the United States Military Academy.

== Background ==
A native of Malden, Missouri, Higginbotham attended Washington University in St. Louis, where he received his A.B. and M.A. degrees. He enrolled as a doctoral student at the University of Nebraska but in 1955 followed Professor John R. Alden, his adviser, to Duke University. In 1958, upon the completion of his dissertation on Brigadier General Daniel Morgan, Duke awarded him his Ph.D. He taught at Longwood College, the College of William and Mary, and Louisiana State University prior to joining the faculty at Chapel Hill where, for 41 years, he taught undergraduate and graduate students.

== Achievements ==
Higginbotham spent five years at the helm of UNC’s history department and served as president of the Southern Historical Association (1990–1991) and the Society for Historians of the Early American Republic (1992–1993). He published numerous essays in collected volumes as well as articles in journals such as the William and Mary Quarterly, the American Historical Review, the Journal of Military History, the Journal of Southern History, and the Journal of the Early Republic. He authored or edited many books, including Daniel Morgan, Revolutionary Rifleman (1961); The Atlas of the American Revolution (1974); The Papers of James Iredell (2 vols., 1976); Reconsiderations on the Revolutionary War (1978); George Washington and the American Military Tradition (1985); War and Society in Revolutionary America: The Wider Dimensions of Conflict (1988); George Washington Reconsidered (2001); George Washington: Uniting a Nation (2002); and Revolution in America: Considerations and Comparisons (2005). His 1971 book, The War of American Independence: Military Attitudes, Policies, and Practice, was nominated for the Pulitzer Prize and remains the standard account of the war and its effects on society. At the time of his death he remained at work on a book manuscript tentatively titled George Washington, Revolutionary—a study of Washington’s leadership as Continental Army commander-in-chief, head of the Constitutional Convention, and first U.S. president.
