= James R. Gaines =

American historian (born 1947)

James R. Gaines (born August 11, 1947) is an American journalist and historian, the author of several books and the former editor of several magazines at Time Incorporated, including People (1987-1990), Life (1990-1993), and Time (1994-1997). He left Time Inc. as Corporate Editor in 1998. Between 2011 and 2015 he was at Reuters in various capacities: as global editor-at-large, as editor in charge of the Americas, as editor in charge of global photography and as global editor for ethics and standards.

Between Time Inc. and Reuters, he was a consultant on magazine startups, acquisitions and digital initiatives for publishers including Conde Nast International and American Express Publishing. In 2007 he became the editor-in-chief of FLYP, a biweekly multimedia publication online that produced interactive material for the web sites of Fortune, Sports Illustrated, Entertainment Weekly, Scientific American and ProPublica. He also served as managing editor of The Daily, News Corp’s “newspaper” for tablets.

He is the author of For Liberty and Glory: Washington, Lafayette and Their Revolutions (W. W. Norton, 2007); Evening in the Palace of Reason: Bach Meets Frederick the Great in the Age of Enlightenment (HarperCollins, 2005) Wit’s End: Days and Nights of the Algonquin Round Table (Harcourt Brace Jovanovich, 1977) and The Fifties: An Underground History (Simon & Schuster, 2022).

Gaines began his career at Saturday Review, before moving on to Newsweek, where he was a National Affairs writer.

A graduate of the University of Michigan, Gaines has been a member of the Council on Foreign Relations, the American Historical Association, the American Society for Eighteenth-Century Studies, and the Overseas Press Club.

== Bibliography ==
- Wit’s End: Days and Nights of the Algonquin Round Table (1977)
- The Lives of the Piano (1981) editor
- Evening in the Palace of Reason: Bach Meets Frederick the Great in the Age of Enlightenment. HarperCollins. 2005. ISBN 9780007156580.
- For Liberty and Glory: Washington, Lafayette and Their Revolutions (2007)
- The Fifties: An Underground History (Simon & Schuster, 2022)
