= Harlow Giles Unger =

American author and historian (1931–2025)

- Born: August 3, 1931
- Died: September 23, 2025 (aged 94)
- Education: Taft School
- Alma mater: Yale University; California State University
- Occupation: Historian
- Children: Richard

Harlow Giles Unger (/ˈʌŋɡər/; August 3, 1931 – September 23, 2025) was an American author and historian, as well as a journalist, broadcaster and educator. He was the author of many books, including the three-volume Encyclopedia of American Education.

== Early life ==
Unger was born on August 3, 1931. He was educated at the Taft School, graduating in 1949. He graduated from Yale College, where he earned a bachelor of arts degree in 1953, and he earned a master's degree from California State University.

== Career ==
Unger was a journalist for the New York Herald Tribune Overseas News Service in Paris, and later worked as a free-lance news and features writer for newspapers and magazines in Britain, Canada, and other countries. To his work in newspaper and magazine journalism, he added writing for radio and academics, becoming an on-air commentator in New York for the Canadian Broadcasting Corporation and an adjunct associate professor of English and journalism at two New York-area colleges.

Unger was a former Distinguished Visiting Fellow in American History at Mount Vernon (2008), and as of 2020 he had written twenty-seven books, including ten biographies of America's founding fathers as well as a biography of statesman Henry Clay.

== Personal life and death ==
Unger formerly resided in Paris, France. He resided in New York City. An avid skier and horseman, he had secondary homes in Chamonix, France, and Jackson Hole, Wyoming. He had one son, Richard C. Unger.

Unger died on September 23, 2025, at the age of 94.

== Bibliography ==
History

- Unger, Harlow Giles (1998). Noah Webster: The Life and Times of an American Patriot. New York, NY: John Wiley & Sons, Inc. 1998. ISBN 978-0-471-33209-1
- Unger, Harlow Giles (2000). John Hancock: Merchant King and American Patriot. Hoboken, NJ: John Wiley & Sons, Inc. 2000. ISBN 978-0-471-33209-1
- Unger, Harlow Giles (2002). Lafayette. Hoboken, NJ: John Wiley & Sons, Inc. 2002. ISBN 978-0-471-46885-1 8]87*64 Tennessee
- Unger, Harlow Giles (2005). The French War Against America: How a Trusted Ally Betrayed Washington and the Founding Fathers. Hoboken, NJ: John Wiley & Sons, Inc. 2005. ISBN 978-0-471-65113-0
- Unger, Harlow Giles (2006). The Unexpected George Washington: His Private Life. Hoboken, NJ: John Wiley & Sons, Inc. 2006. ISBN 978-0-471-74496-2
- Unger, Harlow Giles (2007). America's Second Revolution: How George Washington Defeated Patrick Henry and Saved the Nation. Hoboken, NJ: John Wiley & Sons, Inc. 2007. ISBN 978-0-470-10751-5
- Unger, Harlow Giles (2009). The Last Founding Father: James Monroe and A Nation's Call to Greatness. Boston: Da Capo Press, 2009. ISBN 978-0-306-81808-0
- Unger, Harlow Giles (2010). Lion of Liberty: Patrick Henry and the Call to a New Nation. Boston: Da Capo Press, 2010. ISBN 978-0-306-82046-5
- Unger, Harlow Giles (2011). American Tempest: How the Boston Tea Party Sparked a Revolution. Boston: Da Capo Press, 2011. ISBN 978-0-306-81962-9
- Unger, Harlow Giles (2011). Improbable Patriot: The Secret History of Monsieur de Beaumarchais, the French Playwright Who Saved the American Revolution. Hanover, NH: University Press of New England, 2011. ISBN 978-1-58465-925-9.
- Unger, Harlow Giles (2012). John Quincy Adams. Boston: Da Capo Press, 2012 ISBN 978-0-306-82129-5
- Unger, Harlow Giles (2013). "Mr. President": George Washington and the Making of the Nation's Highest Office. Boston: Da Capo Press, 2013. ISBN 978-0-306-81961-2
- Unger, Harlow Giles (2014). John Marshall: The Chief Justice who Saved the Nation. Boston: Da Capo Press, 2014. ISBN 978-0-306-82220-9
- Unger, Harlow Giles (2015). Henry Clay: America's Greatest Statesman. Boston: Da Capo Press, 2015. ISBN 978-0-306-82391-6
- Unger, Harlow Giles (2017). First Founding Father: Richard Henry Lee and the Call to Independence. Boston: Da Capo Press, 2017. ISBN 978-0-306-82561-3
- Unger, Harlow Giles (2018). Dr. Benjamin Rush: The Founding Father Who Healed a Wounded Nation. Boston: Da Capo Press, 2018. ISBN 978-0-306-82432-6
- Unger, Harlow Giles (2019). Thomas Paine and the Clarion Call for American Independence. Boston: Da Capo Press, 2019. ISBN 978-0306921933

Education

- Unger, Harlow Giles (1986). A Student's Guide to College Admissions: Everything Your Guidance Counselor Has No Time to Tell You. New York, NY: Facts on File Publications
- Unger, Harlow Giles (1991). What Did You Learn in School Today?: A Parent's Guide for Evaluating Your Child's School. New York, NY: Facts on File Publications
- Unger, Harlow Giles (1992). But What If I Don't Want to Go to College?: A Guide to Success Through Alternative Education. New York, NY: Facts on File Publications
- Unger, Harlow Giles (1993). How To Pick a Perfect Private School. New York, NY: Facts on File Publications
- Unger, Harlow Giles (1994). Teachers and Educators. New York, NY: Facts on File Publications
- Unger, Harlow Giles (1996). Encyclopedia of American Education. 3 vols. New York, NY: Facts on File Publications
- Unger, Harlow Giles (1998). The Learning Disabilities Trap: How to Save Your Child from the Perils of Special Education. Lincolnwood, IL: Contemporary Books
- Unger, Harlow Giles (1999). School Choice: How to Select the Best Schools for Your Children. New York, NY: Facts on File Publications
