= John A. Nagy =

John Allan Nagy (1946 – April 1, 2016), was a nonfiction writer on the American Revolution with an expertise in the field of espionage and mutinies.

Nagy was born in Perth Amboy, New Jersey and graduated from Perth Amboy High School in 1964. In 1968 he graduated from Saint Francis University, Loretto, Pennsylvania. He later attended Stevens Institute of Technology, Hoboken, New Jersey, and graduated in 1979 with a master's degree in Management Science. He lived in Mount Laurel, New Jersey. Nagy died at his home in New Jersey on April 1, 2016.

== Work ==
He was a Scholar in Residence at Saint Francis University, Loretto, Pennsylvania and has been a consultant for Colonial Williamsburg, Fred W. Smith National Library for the Study of George Washington at George Washington's Mount Vernon, and the William L. Clements Library of the University of Michigan in Ann Arbor, Michigan on espionage. He has appeared on C-SPAN, the History Channel, and been interviewed twice in hour-long programs for Pennsylvania Cable Network. He also appeared in "The President's Inner Circle" episode of Brad Meltzer's Decoded.

In 2003 he was the speaker representing the French Government with a talk on the French Spies in the American Revolution at the Franco-American Alliance Celebration on the 225th anniversary of the Treaties signed in Paris on 6 February 1778 held on February 6, 2003, at Carpenter's Hall, Philadelphia, Pennsylvania.

In April 2015, he was a research fellow at the Robert H. Smith International Center for Jefferson Studies at Thomas Jefferson's Monticello in Charlottesville, Virginia.

He completed his 5th book on the American Revolution, George Washington's Secret Spy War: The Making of America's First Spymaster, in early 2016 before his death in April. It was released posthumously in September 2016.

== Awards ==
2007 American Revolution Round Table of Philadelphia best book published in 2007 on the American Revolution Era.

== Bibliography ==
- 2007 Rebellion in the Ranks, Mutinies of the American Revolution 978-1594160554
- 2010 Invisible Ink, Spycraft of the American Revolution 978-15944160974 and 978-1594161414
- 2011 Spies in the Continental Capital, Espionage Across Pennsylvania During the American Revolution 978-1594161339
- 2013 Dr. Benjamin Church Spy, A Case of Espionage on the Eve of the American Revolution 978-1594161841
- 2016 George Washington's Secret Spy War: The Making of America's First Spymaster 978-1250096814

== Chapters ==
- 2012 Chapter 20 George Washington Spymaster, pages 344–357 in A Companion to George Washington edited by Edward G. Lengel 978-1-4443-3103-5
- 2014 Chapter on Allen McLane's espionage activities in Allen McLane : patriot, soldier, spy, port collector by Thomas Welch and Michael Lloyd. OCLC number 897363610
- 2015 Chapter "The British Spy Plot to Capture Fort Ticonderoga" pages 179–183 in the "Journal of the American Revolution Annual Volume 2015" edited by Todd Andrlik 978-1-59416-228-2

== Video and podcasts ==
- Video on YouTube of his talk at the American Revolution Round Table of North Jersey on October 13, 2012
- Scientific American Magazine Website Invisible Ink and More: The Science of Spying in the Revolutionary War by Steve Mirsky on April 20, 2010, podcast
- An audio podcast at the New York Military Affairs Symposium at New York University Graduate School on Rebellion in the Ranks: Mutinies of the American Revolution recorded April 18, 2008. Download it to play.
- Public Broadcasting Service television show A Taste of History season six (2015) episodes 2 and 4.

== Articles about John A. Nagy ==
- About restoring the Thomas Budd House in Mount Holly, New Jersey Philadelphia Inquirer December 27, 1987
- Article in The Star Ledger about a lecture he gave on the book "Rebellion in the Ranks: Mutinies of the American Revolution." It was given at the Washington Association's 135th annual meeting on February 16, 2009, at the Madison Hotel. Article is available at http://www.nj.com/news/index.ssf/2009/02/george_washington_was_the_cele.html
- Referenced in an article on Slate on July 1, 2010. Ghost Writers, Were the Russian spies using the same invisible ink you can buy at toy stores? by Christopher Beam. Article at http://www.slate.com/articles/news_and_politics/explainer/2010/07/ghost_writers.html
- Scientific American Magazine Website Invisible Ink and More: The Science of Spying in the Revolutionary War by Steve Mirsky on April 20, 2010, and podcast
