= Catherine Crary =

American historian

Catherine Snell Crary
- Born: 12 February 1909; Rochester, New York
- Died: 11 March 1974 (aged 65); New York City
- Education: Mount Holyoke College (B.A.); Radcliffe College (Ph.D)
- Occupation: Historian
- Spouse: Calvert Crary
- Awards: American Revolution Bicentennial Roundtable Award

Catherine Crary, née Conrad (12 February 1909 – 11 March 1974), was an American historian of the American Revolution.

== Life and work ==
Catherine Snell Crary was born in Rochester, New York on 12 February 1909. Privately educated, she graduated from Mount Holyoke College in 1930 with a B.A. Two year later, she married Calvert Crary and received her Ph.D. from Radcliffe College in 1933. She taught history at Brearley School in New York City before becoming a lecturer in history at Barnard College. Crary was an adjunct professor of history at Finch College in 1957–59. That latter year, she found a presumed-lost holograph draft of the Federalist Papers No. 64 in the John Jay papers at Columbia University. She also had an article in the William and Mary Quarterly that year that showed that James Rivington, a New York City newspaper editor during the British occupation of the city, fed information to an American agent. Crary published Dear Belle: Letters from a Cadet and Officer to His Sweetheart, 1858–1865 in 1965 and The Price of Loyalty: Tory Writings from the Revolutionary Era in 1973. The latter book was honored with the American Revolution Bicentennial Roundtable Award the following year. She died in New York City on 11 March 1974.
