= Nancy Rubin Stuart =

American author and journalist (born 1944)

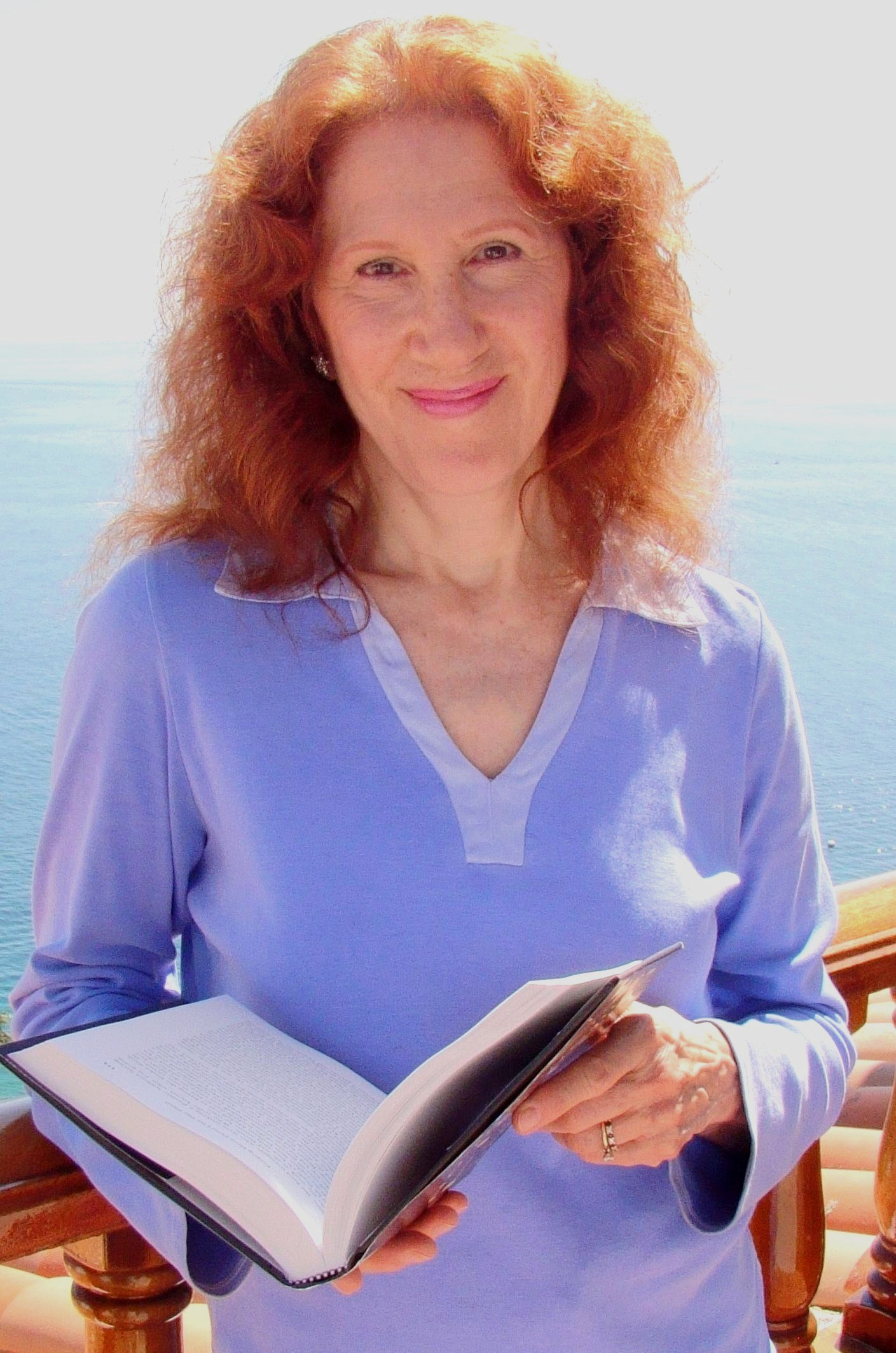
- Nancy Rubin Stuart
- Born: Nancy R. Zimman; November 25, 1944 (age 81)
- Other name: Nancy Rubin
- Education: Tufts University School of Arts and Sciences (Jackson College for Women) (B.A., 1966); Brown University (M.A.T., 1967)
- Occupations: author, journalist, TV writer-producer
- Known for: author specializing in women's history
- Website: www.nancyrubinstuart.com

Nancy Rubin Stuart (née Nancy R. Zimman; b.1944), formerly known as Nancy Rubin, is an American author and journalist.

Stuart has served as Executive Director of the Cape Cod Writers Center since 2009.

She is the author of eight traditionally-published nonfiction books about women and social history.

Stuart has contributed to the Journal of the American Revolution, The Saturday Evening Post, The New England Quarterly, The Huffington Post and many pre-digital magazines.

== Education and career ==
Stuart is a 1966 graduate of Jackson College of Tufts University. She received her Master of Arts in Teaching from Brown University in 1967.

Stuart was a contributor to the New York Times from 1977-2001 in the Westchester, Long Island, Travel, National Career Survey, Education Life and News in Review sections under the byline of Nancy Rubin.

Stuart was a Time Inc. Fellow at the Bread Loaf Writers' Conference in 1979 and a 1981 Fellow at the MacDowell Colony. Stuart won the American Society of Journalists and Authors' 1992 Author of the Year for her book Isabella of Castile.

Mount Vernon College (now part of George Washington University) conferred a Doctor of Humane Letters upon Stuart in 1995 for her biography of Marjorie Merriweather Post, American Empress.

Stuart served as a writer for Cinetel Productions in A&E Network's America's Castles between 1996-1998, for which she won an Excellence in Writing Telly Award. From 1999-2001 she served as a writer-producer for Scripps Production's Restore America series for HGTV and received two additional Telly Awards. She also serves as co-ambassador for the Boston chapter of The Author’s Guild and is president of the Mercy Otis Warren Society Inc.

== Bibliography ==
=== Books ===
- Rubin, Nancy (1982). The New Suburban Woman: Beyond Myth and Motherhood. New York: Coward, McCann & Geoghegan. ISBN 0-698-11133-8
- Rubin, Nancy (1984). The Mother Mirror: How A Generation of Women Is Changing Motherhood in America. New York: G.P.Putnam's Sons. ISBN 0-399-12981-2
- Rubin, Nancy (1991). Isabella of Castile: The First Renaissance Queen. New York: St. Martin's Press. ISBN 0-312-05878-0
- Rubin, Nancy (1995). American Empress: The Life and Times of Marjorie Merriweather Post. New York: Villard Books. ISBN 0-679-41347-2
- Stuart, Nancy Rubin (2005). The Reluctant Spiritualist: The Life of Maggie Fox. New York: Harcourt, Inc. ISBN 0-15-101013-7
- Stuart, Nancy Rubin (2008). The Muse of the Revolution: The Secret Pen of Mercy Otis Warren and the Founding of a Nation. Boston: Beacon Press ISBN 978-0-8070-5516-8
- Stuart, Nancy Rubin (2013). Defiant Brides: The Untold Story of Two Revolutionary Era Women and the Radical Men They Married. Boston: Beacon Press ISBN 978-0-8070-0117-2
- Stuart, Nancy Rubin (2022). Poor Richard's Women: Deborah Read Franklin and the Other Women Behind the Founding Father. Boston: Beacon Press ISBN 978-0-8070-1130-0
