= Benedict Arnold =

British military officer (1741–1801)

Brigadier-General Benedict Arnold
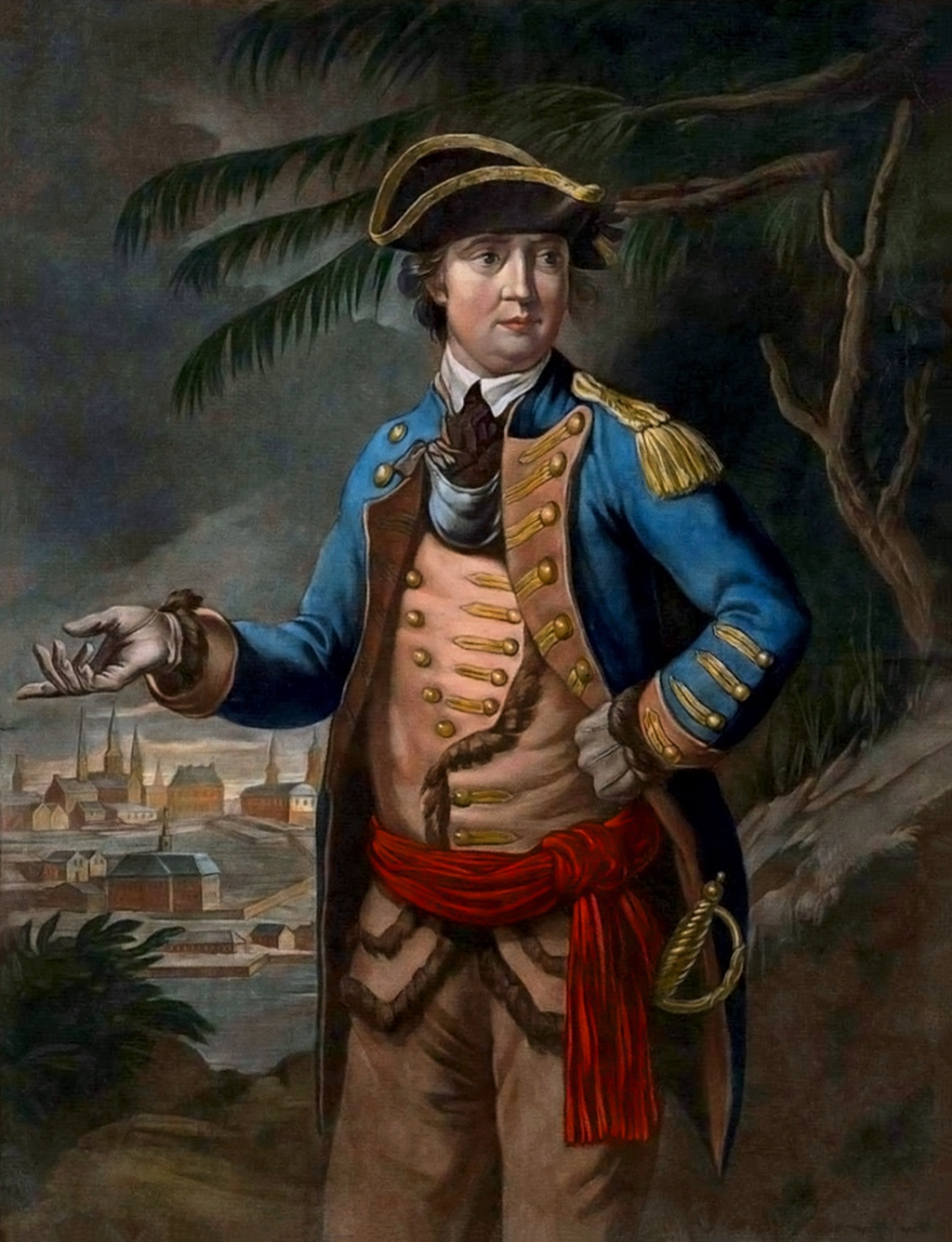
- Portrait, c. 1776
- Born: January 14, 1741; Norwich, Connecticut, British America
- Died: June 14, 1801 (aged 60); London, England
- Burial place: St. Mary's Church, Battersea; 51°28′36″N 0°10′32″W
- Spouses: Margaret Mansfield (m. 1767; died 1775); Peggy Shippen (m. 1779)
- Children: 8
- Relatives: Hannah Arnold (mother); Benedict Arnold (great-grandfather); William Arnold (great-great-grandfather)
- Military career
- Allegiance: New York; Connecticut; Massachusetts; United States; Great Britain
- Branch: New York Provincial Forces; Connecticut Militia; Massachusetts Militia; Continental Army; British Army
- Service years: 1760, 1775 (colonial forces); 1775–1780 (Continental Army); 1780–1781 (British Army)
- Rank: Major General (Continental Army); Brigadier General (British Army)
- Commands: Fort Ticonderoga (June 1775); Quebec City (January–April 1776); Montreal (April–June 1776); Lake Champlain (August–October 1776); Philadelphia (June 1778–April 1780); Fort Arnold (August–September 1780); American Legion (October 1780–1783)
- Conflicts: French and Indian War; American Revolutionary War; American service; Capture of Fort Ticonderoga; Battle of Quebec (WIA); Battle of the Cedars; Battle of Valcour Island; Battle of Ridgefield (WIA); Siege of Fort Stanwix; Battles of Saratoga (WIA); British service; Raid on Richmond; Battle of Blandford; Battle of Groton Heights
- Memorials: Boot Monument
- Other work: Apothecary; merchant

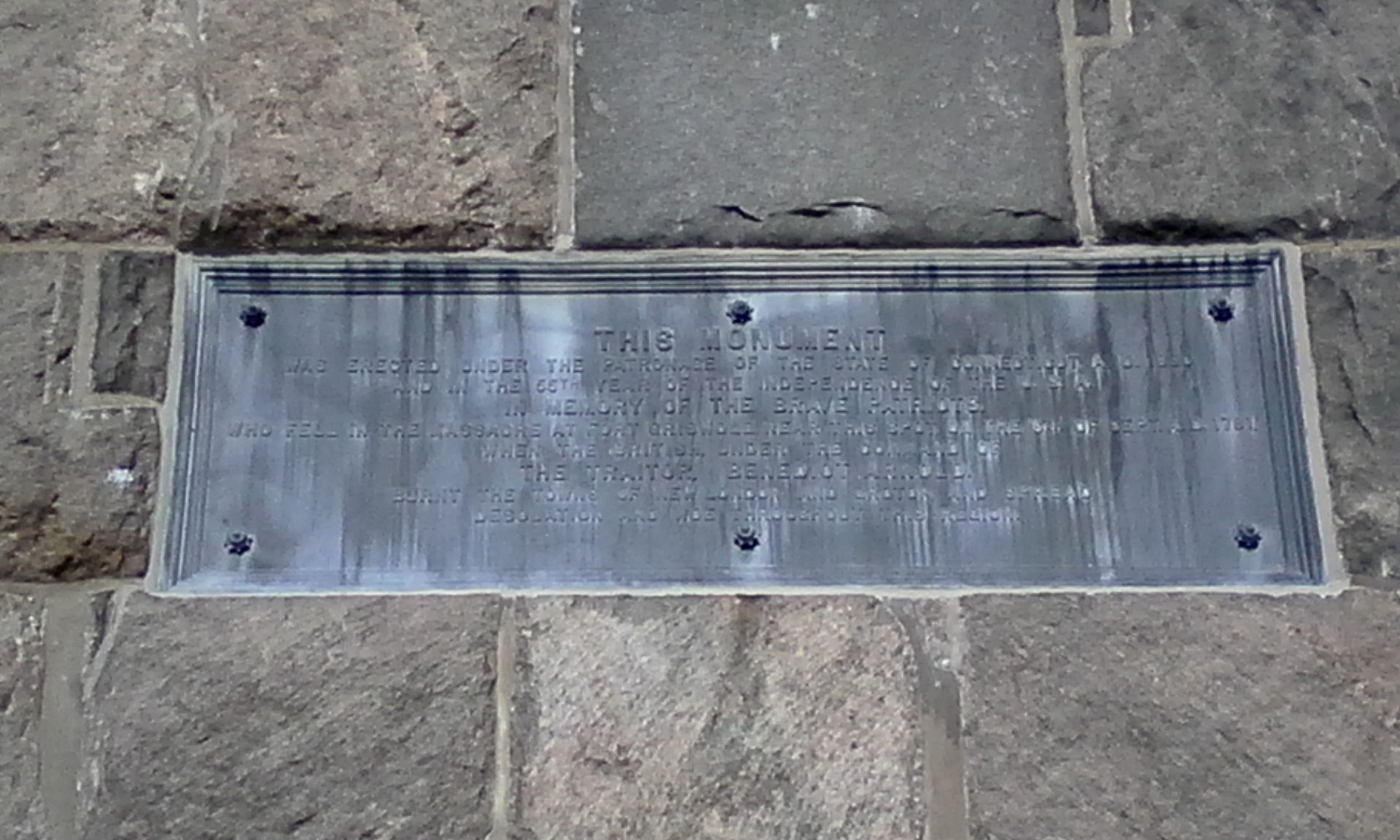
Dedication plaque on Groton Monument in Groton, Connecticut, to victims of Arnold's slaughter following the Battle of Groton Heights: This monument was erected under the patronage of the State of Connecticut in the 55th year of the Independence of the U.S.A. in memory of the brave patriots massacred at Fort Griswold near this spot on the 6th of Sept. AD 1781, when the British, under the command of the Traitor Benedict Arnold, burnt the towns of New London and Groton and spread desolation and woe throughout the region.

Benedict Arnold (January 14, 1741 [O.S. January 3, 1740] (Note: Arnold's birth records indicate that he was born January 3, 1740 (Vital Records of Norwich (1913)). His date of birth is recorded in the Gregorian calendar as January 14, 1741, because of the change from Julian to Gregorian calendar and the change of the beginning of the year from March 25 to January 1.) – June 14, 1801) was an American-born British military officer who served during the American Revolutionary War. He fought with distinction for the American Continental Army and rose to the rank of major general before defecting to the British in 1780. General George Washington had given him his fullest trust and had placed him in command of West Point in New York. Arnold was planning to surrender the fort to British forces, but the plot was discovered in September 1780, whereupon he fled to the British lines. In the later part of the war, Arnold was commissioned as a brigadier general in the British Army and placed in command of the American Legion. He led British forces in battle against the army which he had once commanded, and his name became synonymous with treason and betrayal in the United States.

Born in Connecticut, Arnold was a merchant operating ships in the Atlantic when the war began. He joined the growing American army outside of Boston and distinguished himself by acts that demonstrated intelligence and bravery: In 1775, he captured Fort Ticonderoga. In 1776, he employed defensive and delaying tactics at the Battle of Valcour Island on Lake Champlain that gave American forces time to prepare New York's defenses. His performance in the Battle of Ridgefield in Connecticut prompted his promotion to major general. He conducted operations that provided the Americans with relief during the Siege of Fort Stanwix, and key actions during the pivotal 1777 Battles of Saratoga in which he sustained leg injuries that put him out of combat for several years.

Arnold repeatedly claimed that he was being passed over for promotion by the Second Continental Congress, and that other officers were being given credit for some of his accomplishments. Some in his military and political circles charged him with corruption. After formal inquiries, he was acquitted of all but two minor charges, but Congress investigated his finances and determined that he was indebted to Congress and that he had borrowed money heavily to maintain a lavish lifestyle.

Arnold mingled with Loyalist sympathizers in Philadelphia and married into the Loyalist family of Peggy Shippen. She was a close friend of British Major John André and kept in contact with him when he became head of the British espionage system in New York. Many historians see her as having facilitated Arnold's plans to switch sides; he opened secret negotiations with André, and she relayed their messages to each other. The British promised £20,000 (equivalent to £3,104,000 in 2025) for the capture of West Point, a major American stronghold. Washington greatly admired Arnold and gave him command of that fort in July 1780. Arnold planned to surrender the fort to the British, but it was exposed in September 1780 when American militiamen captured André carrying papers which revealed the plot. Arnold escaped, and André was hanged.

Arnold received a commission as a brigadier general in the British Army, an annual pension of £360 (equivalent to £56,000 in 2025) and a lump sum of over £6,000 (equivalent to £931,000 in 2025). He led British forces in the raid on Richmond and oversaw a raid on New London, Connecticut, which burned much of it to the ground. Arnold also commanded British forces at the Battle of Blandford and the Battle of Groton Heights, the latter taking place just a few miles downriver from the town where he had grown up. In the winter of 1782, he and Shippen moved to London. He was well received by King George III and the Tories but frowned upon by the Whigs and most British Army officers. In 1787, he moved to the colony of New Brunswick in what is now Canada to run a merchant business with his sons Richard and Henry. He was extremely unpopular there and returned to London permanently in 1791, where he died ten years later.

== Early life ==
Benedict Arnold was born the second of six children of his father Benedict Arnold III (1683–1761) and Hannah Waterman King in Norwich, Connecticut Colony, on January 14, 1741. Arnold was the fourth member of his family named after his great-grandfather Benedict Arnold I, an early governor of the Colony of Rhode Island; his grandfather (Benedict Arnold II) and father, as well as an older brother who died in infancy, were also named for the colonial governor. Only he and his sister Hannah survived to adulthood; his other siblings died from yellow fever in childhood. Arnold's siblings were, in order of birth: Benedict (1738–1739), Hannah (1742–1803), Mary (1745–1753), Absolom (1747–1750) and Elizabeth (1749–1755). Through his maternal grandmother, Arnold was a descendant of John Lothropp, an ancestor of six presidents.

Arnold's father was a successful businessman, and the family moved in the upper levels of Norwich society. He was enrolled in a private school in nearby Canterbury when he was aged 10, with the expectation that he would eventually attend Yale College. However, the deaths of his siblings two years later may have contributed to a decline in the family's fortunes, since his father took up drinking. By the time Arnold was 14, there was no money for private education. His father's alcoholism and ill health kept him from training Arnold in the family mercantile business, but his mother's family connections secured an apprenticeship for him with her cousins Daniel and Joshua Lathrop, who operated a successful apothecary and general merchandise trade in Norwich. His apprenticeship with the Lathrops lasted seven years.

Arnold was very close to his mother, who died in 1759. His father's alcoholism worsened after her death, and the youth took on the responsibility of supporting his father and younger sister. The elder Arnold was arrested on several occasions for public drunkenness, was refused communion by his church, and died in 1761.

== French and Indian War ==
In 1755, Arnold was attracted by the sound of a drummer and attempted to enlist in the Connecticut provincial militia for service in the French and Indian War (known in Canada as a part of the more global Seven Years' War), but his mother refused permission. In 1757, when he was aged 16, Arnold did enlist in the Connecticut militia, which marched off toward Albany, New York, and Lake George. The French had besieged Fort William Henry in northeastern New York, and their Indian allies had committed atrocities after their victory. Word of the siege's disastrous outcome led the company to turn around, and Arnold served for only thirteen days. A commonly accepted story that he deserted from militia service in 1758 is based on uncertain documentary evidence.

== Colonial merchant ==
Arnold established himself in business in 1762 as a pharmacist and bookseller in New Haven, Connecticut, with the help of the Lathrops. He was hardworking and successful, and was able to rapidly expand his business. In 1763, he repaid money that he had borrowed from the Lathrops, repurchased the family homestead that his father had sold when deeply in debt, and resold it a year later for a substantial profit. In 1764, he formed a partnership with Adam Babcock, another young New Haven merchant. They bought three trading ships, using the profits from the sale of their homestead, and established a lucrative West Indies trade.

During this time, Arnold brought his sister Hannah to New Haven and established her in his apothecary to manage the business in his absence. He traveled extensively in the course of his business throughout New England and from Quebec to the West Indies, often in command of one of his own ships. Some sources allege that on one of his voyages he fought a duel in Honduras with a British sea captain who had called him a "damned Yankee, destitute of good manners or those of a gentleman." The captain was wounded in the first exchange of gunfire, and he apologized when Arnold threatened to aim to kill on the second. However, it is unknown whether this encounter actually happened or not, and some historians characterize the alleged duel as a fabrication.

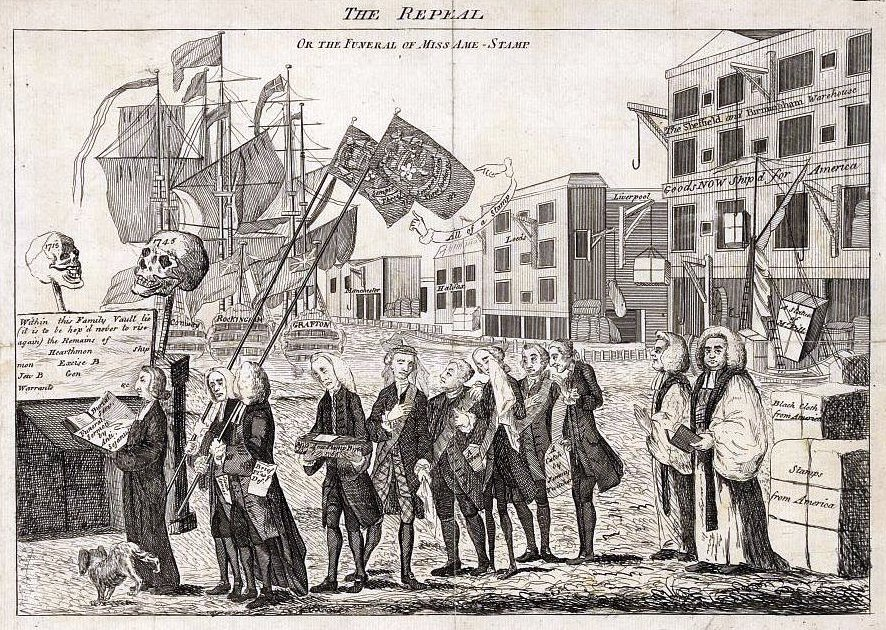
A 1766 political cartoon on the repeal of the Stamp Act

The Sugar Act 1764 and the Stamp Act 1765 severely curtailed mercantile trade in the colonies. The Stamp Act prompted Arnold to join the chorus of voices in opposition, and also led to his joining the Sons of Liberty, a secret organization which advocated resistance to those and other restrictive Parliamentary measures. Arnold initially took no part in any public demonstrations but, like many merchants, continued to do business openly in defiance of the acts, which legally amounted to smuggling. He also faced financial ruin, falling £16,000 (equivalent to £2,444,000 in 2025) in debt with creditors spreading rumors of his insolvency, to the point where he took legal action against them. On the night of January 28, 1767, Arnold and members of his crew roughed up a man suspected of attempting to inform authorities of their smuggling. He was convicted of disorderly conduct and fined the relatively small amount of 50 shillings; publicity of the case and widespread sympathy for his views probably contributed to the light sentence.

On February 22, 1767, Arnold married Margaret Mansfield, daughter of Samuel Mansfield, the sheriff of New Haven and a fellow member in the local Masonic lodge. Their son Benedict was born the following year and was followed by brothers Richard in 1769 and Henry in 1772. Margaret died on June 19, 1775, while Arnold was at Fort Ticonderoga following its capture. She is buried in the crypt of the Center Church on New Haven Green. The household was dominated by Arnold's sister Hannah, even while Margaret was alive. Arnold benefited from his relationship with Mansfield, who became a partner in his business and used his position as sheriff to shield him from creditors.

Arnold was in the West Indies when the Boston Massacre took place on March 5, 1770. He wrote that he was "very much shocked" and wondered, "Good God, are the Americans all asleep and tamely giving up their liberties, or are they all turned philosophers, that they don't take immediate vengeance on such miscreants?"

== Revolutionary War (American service) ==
=== Siege of Boston and Fort Ticonderoga ===
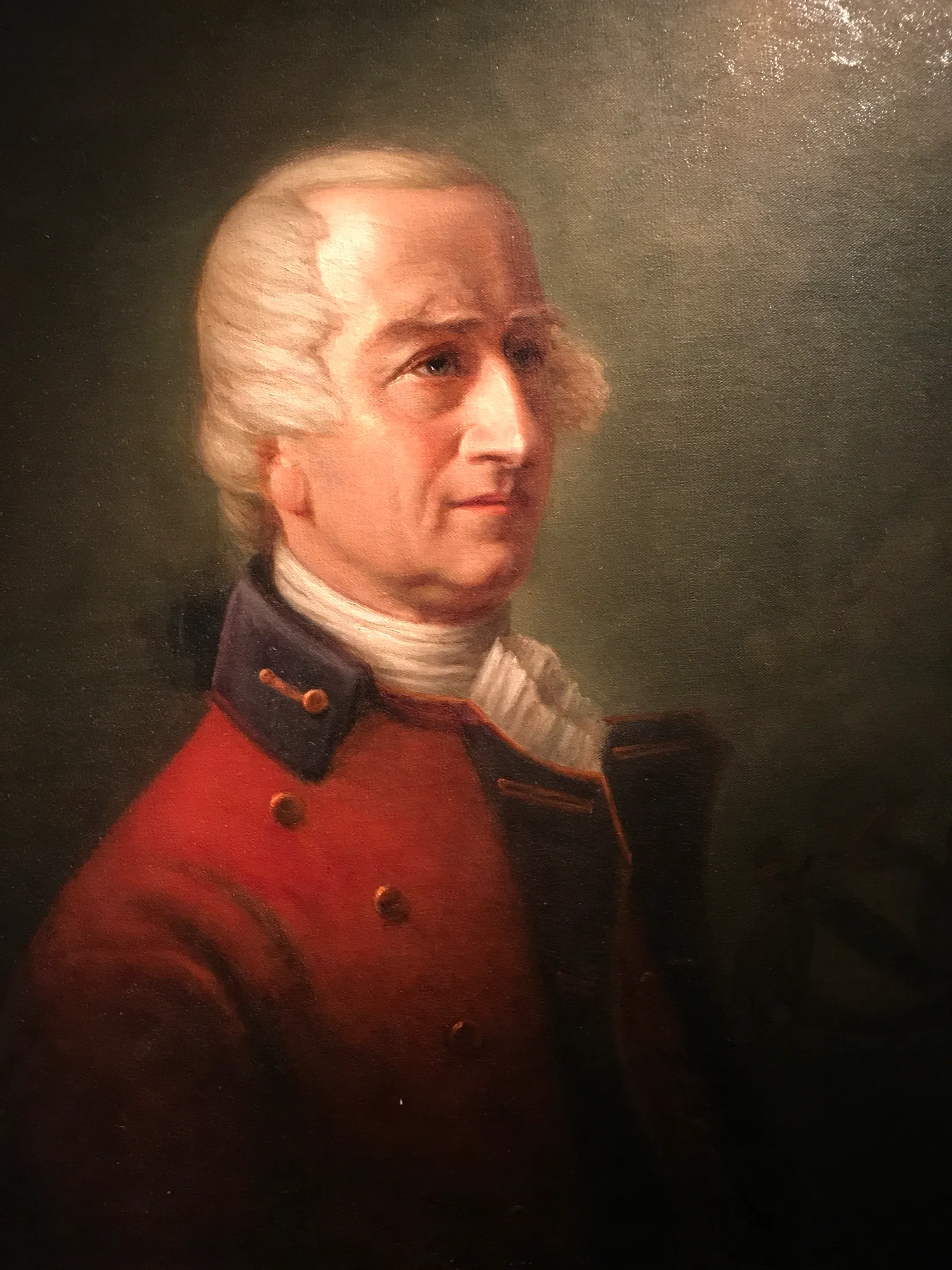
Quebec Governor Guy Carleton opposed Arnold at Quebec and Valcour Island.

Arnold began the war as a captain in the Connecticut militia, a position to which he was elected in March 1775. His company marched northeast the following month to assist in the Siege of Boston that followed the Battles of Lexington and Concord. He proposed an action to the Massachusetts Committee of Safety to seize Fort Ticonderoga in upstate New York, which he knew was poorly defended. They issued him a colonel's commission on May 3, 1775, and he immediately rode off to Castleton in the disputed New Hampshire Grants (Vermont) in time to participate with Ethan Allen and his men in the capture of Fort Ticonderoga. He followed up that action with a bold raid on Fort Saint-Jean on the Richelieu River north of Lake Champlain. A Connecticut militia force arrived at Ticonderoga in June; Arnold had a dispute with its commander over control of the fort and resigned his Massachusetts commission. He was on his way home from Ticonderoga when he learned that his wife had died earlier in June.

=== Quebec expedition ===
The Second Continental Congress authorized an invasion of Quebec, in part on the urging of Arnold, but he was passed over for command of the expedition. He then went to Cambridge, Massachusetts, and suggested to George Washington a second expedition to attack Quebec City via a wilderness route through present-day Maine. He received a colonel's commission in the Continental Army for this expedition and left Cambridge in September 1775 with 1,100 men. He arrived before Quebec City in November, after a difficult passage in which 300 men turned back and another 200 died en route. Arnold's forces were joined by Richard Montgomery's small army and participated in the December 31 assault on Quebec City in which Montgomery was killed and Arnold's leg was shattered. Arnold's chaplain, Rev. Samuel Spring, carried him to the makeshift hospital at the Hôtel Dieu. Arnold was promoted to brigadier general for his role in reaching Quebec, and he maintained an ineffectual siege of the city until he was replaced by Major General David Wooster in April 1776.

Arnold then traveled to Montreal, where he served as military commander of the city until forced to retreat by an advancing British army that had arrived at Quebec in May. He presided over the rear of the Continental Army during its retreat from Saint-Jean, where he was reported by James Wilkinson to be the last person to leave before the British arrived. He then directed the construction of a fleet to defend Lake Champlain, which was overmatched and defeated in the Battle of Valcour Island in October 1776. However, his actions at Saint-Jean and Valcour Island played a notable role in delaying the British advance against Fort Ticonderoga until 1777.

During these actions, Arnold made several friends and a larger number of enemies within the army power structure and in Congress. He had established a decent relationship with Washington, as well as Philip Schuyler and Horatio Gates, both of whom had command of the army's Northern Department during 1775 and 1776. However, an acrimonious dispute with Moses Hazen, commander of the 2nd Canadian Regiment, boiled into Hazen's court martial at Fort Ticonderoga during the summer of 1776. Only action by Arnold's superior at Ticonderoga prevented his own arrest on countercharges leveled by Hazen. Arnold also had disagreements with John Brown and James Easton, two lower-level officers with political connections that resulted in ongoing suggestions of improprieties on his part. Brown was particularly vicious, publishing a handbill which claimed of Arnold, "Money is this man's God, and to get enough of it he would sacrifice his country."

=== Rhode Island and Philadelphia ===
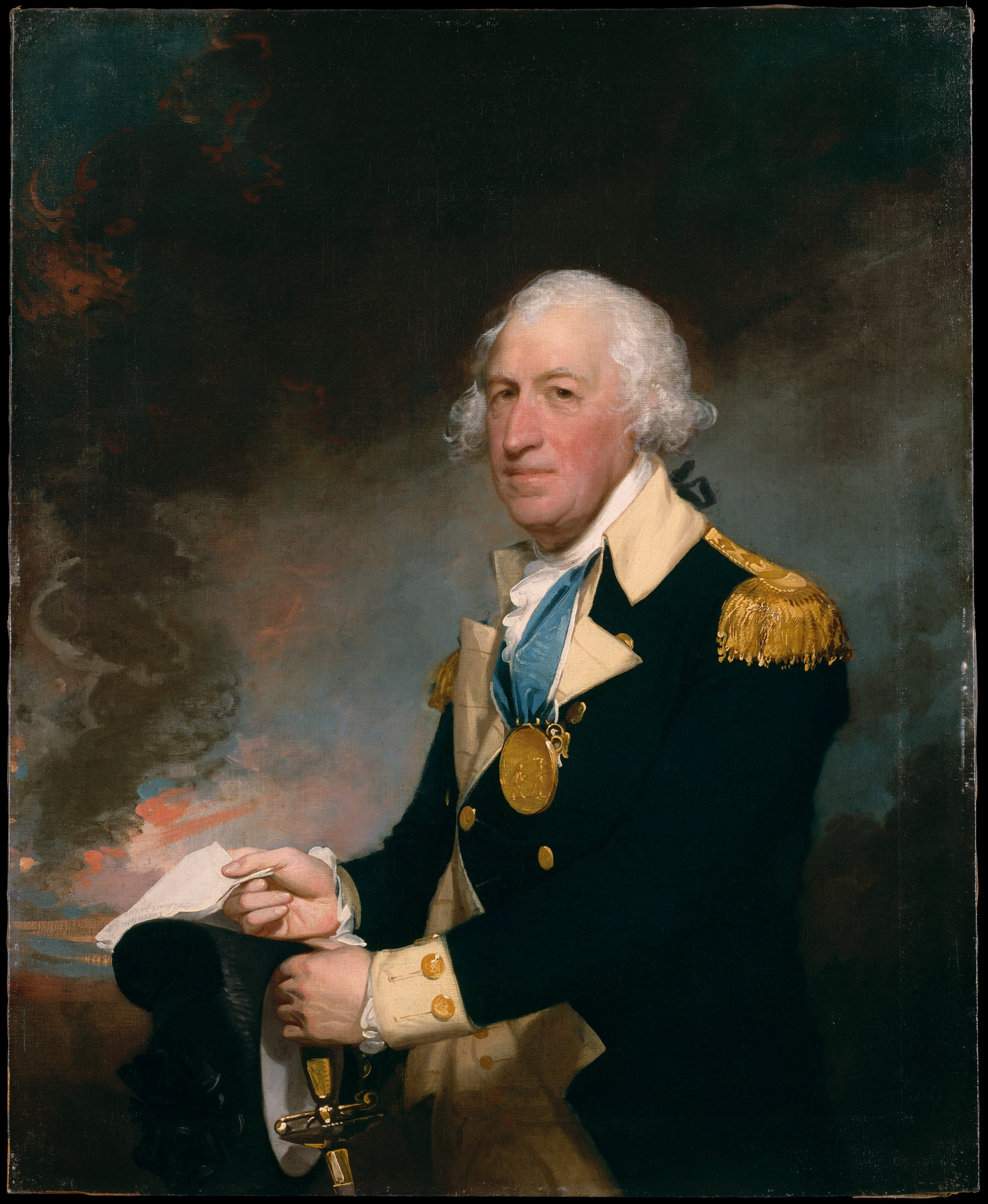
Major General Horatio Gates led the forces at Saratoga; Portrait of Horatio Gates by Gilbert Stuart, 1793–1794.

Washington assigned Arnold to the defense of Rhode Island following the British capture of Newport in December 1776, where the local militia was too poorly equipped to even consider a counterattack. He took the opportunity to visit his children while near his home in New Haven, and he spent much of the winter socializing in Boston, where he unsuccessfully courted a young belle named Betsy Deblois. In February 1777, Arnold learned that he had been passed over by Congress for promotion to major general. Washington refused his offer to resign and wrote to members of Congress in an attempt to correct this, noting that "two or three other very good officers" might be lost if they persisted in making politically motivated promotions.

Arnold was on his way to Philadelphia to discuss his future when he was alerted that a British force was marching toward a supply depot in Danbury, Connecticut. He organized the militia response, along with Wooster and Connecticut militia General Gold Selleck Silliman. He then led a small contingent of militia attempting to stop or slow the British return to the coast in the Battle of Ridgefield, and was again wounded in his left leg.

Arnold then continued to Philadelphia, where he met with members of Congress about his rank. His action at Ridgefield, coupled with the death of Wooster due to wounds sustained in the action, resulted in his promotion to major general, although his seniority was not restored over those who had been promoted before him. Amid negotiations over that issue, Arnold wrote out a letter of resignation on July 11, the same day that word arrived in Philadelphia that Fort Ticonderoga had fallen to the British. Washington refused his resignation and ordered him north to assist with the defense there.

=== Saratoga campaign ===
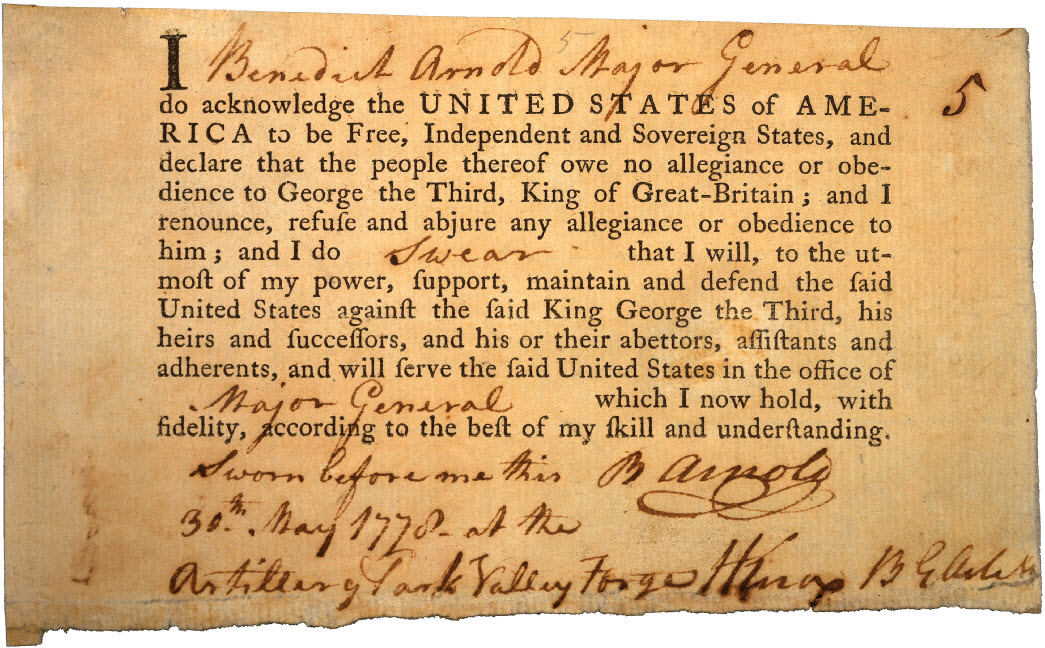
Arnold's oath of allegiance, May 30, 1778

Arnold arrived in Schuyler's camp at Fort Edward, New York, on July 24. On August 13, Schuyler dispatched him with a force of 900 to relieve the Siege of Fort Stanwix, where he succeeded in a ruse to lift the siege. Arnold sent an Indian messenger into the camp of British Brigadier-General Barry St. Leger with news that the approaching force was much larger and closer than it actually was; this convinced St. Leger's Indian allies to abandon him, forcing him to give up the effort.

Arnold returned to the Hudson River, where General Gates had taken over command of the American army after they had retreated to a camp south of Stillwater. He then distinguished himself in both Battles of Saratoga, even though Gates removed him from field command after the first battle, following a series of escalating disagreements that culminated in a shouting match. During the fighting in the second battle, Arnold disobeyed Gates' orders and took to the battlefield to lead attacks on the British defenses. He was again severely wounded in the left leg late in the fighting. Arnold later said that it would have been better had it been in the chest instead of the leg. Burgoyne surrendered ten days after the second battle on October 17, 1777. Congress restored Arnold's command seniority in response to his valor at Saratoga. However, he interpreted the manner in which they did so as an act of sympathy for his wounds, and not an apology or recognition that they were righting a wrong.

Arnold spent several months recovering from his injuries. He had his leg crudely set rather than allowing it to be amputated, leaving it 2 inches (5 cm) shorter than the right. He returned to the army at Valley Forge, Pennsylvania, in May 1778 to the applause of men who had served under him at Saratoga. There he participated in the first recorded oath of allegiance, along with many other soldiers, as a sign of loyalty to the United States.

=== Residence in Philadelphia ===
When the British withdrew from Philadelphia in June 1778, Washington appointed Arnold military commander of the city.

Arnold began planning to capitalize financially on the change in power in Philadelphia, even before the Americans reoccupied their city. He engaged in a variety of business deals designed to profit from war-related supply movements and benefiting from the protection of his authority. Such schemes were not uncommon among American officers, but Arnold's schemes were sometimes frustrated by local politicians such as Joseph Reed, who eventually amassed enough evidence to publicly air charges of corruption against him. Arnold demanded a court-martial to clear the charges, writing to Washington in May 1779: "Having become a cripple in the service of my country, I little expected to meet ungrateful returns."

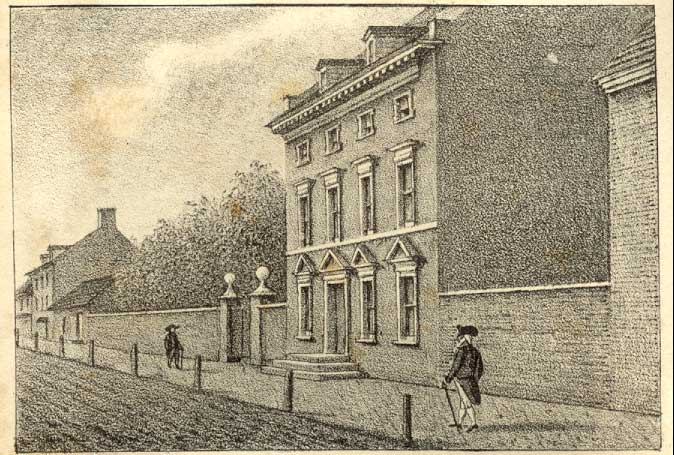
President's House in Philadelphia, where Arnold made his headquarters while he was military commander of Philadelphia; it served as the presidential mansion of George Washington and John Adams from 1790 to 1800.

Arnold lived extravagantly in Philadelphia and was a prominent figure on the social scene. During the summer of 1778 he met Peggy Shippen, the 18-year-old daughter of Judge Edward Shippen IV, a Loyalist sympathizer who had done business with the British while they occupied the city; Peggy had been courted by Major John André during the occupation. She married Arnold on April 8, 1779. Shippen and her circle of friends had found methods of staying in contact with paramours across the battle lines, despite military bans on communication with the enemy. Some of this communication was effected through the services of Joseph Stansbury, a Philadelphia merchant.

== Plotting to change sides ==
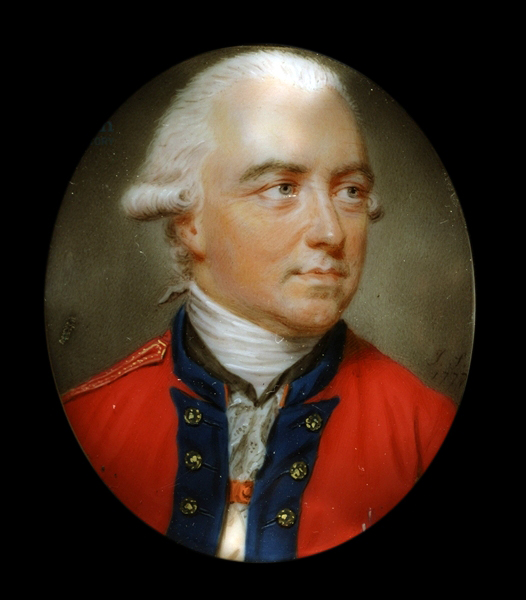
Lieutenant General Henry Clinton

Historians have identified many possible factors contributing to Arnold's treason, while some debate their relative importance. According to W. D. Wetherell, Arnold was:

[A]mong the hardest human beings to understand in American history. Did he become a traitor because of all the injustice he suffered, real and imagined, at the hands of the Continental Congress and his jealous fellow generals? Because of the constant agony of two battlefield wounds in an already gout-ridden leg? From psychological wounds received in his Connecticut childhood when his alcoholic father squandered the family's fortunes? Or was it a kind of extreme midlife crisis, swerving from radical political beliefs to reactionary ones, a change accelerated by his marriage to the very young, very pretty, very Tory Peggy Shippen?

Wetherell says that the shortest explanation for Arnold's treason is that he "married the wrong person."

Arnold had been badly wounded twice in battle and had lost his business in Connecticut, which made him profoundly bitter. He grew resentful of several rival and younger generals who had been promoted ahead of him and given honors which he thought he deserved. Especially galling was a long feud with the civil authorities in Philadelphia, which led to his court-martial. He was also convicted of two minor charges of using his authority to make a profit. Washington gave him a light reprimand, but it merely heightened Arnold's sense of betrayal; nonetheless, he had already opened negotiations with the British before his court-martial had even begun. Arnold later said in his own defense that he was loyal to his true beliefs, yet he lied at the same time by insisting that Shippen was totally innocent and ignorant of his plans.

As early as 1778, there were signs that Arnold was unhappy with his situation and pessimistic about the country's future. On November 10, 1778, Major General Nathanael Greene wrote to Brigadier General John Cadwalader, "I am told General Arnold is become very unpopular among you owing to his associating too much with the Tories." A few days later, Arnold wrote to Greene and lamented over the "deplorable" and "horrid" situation of the country at that particular moment, citing the depreciating currency, disaffection of the army and internal fighting in Congress, while predicting "impending ruin" if things did not change soon. Biographer Nathaniel Philbrick argues:

Peggy Shippen… did have a significant role in the plot. She exerted a powerful influence on her husband, who is said to have been his own man but who actually was swayed by his staff and certainly by his wife. Peggy came from a loyalist family in Philadelphia; she had many ties to the British. She… was the conduit for information to the British.

=== Secret communications ===
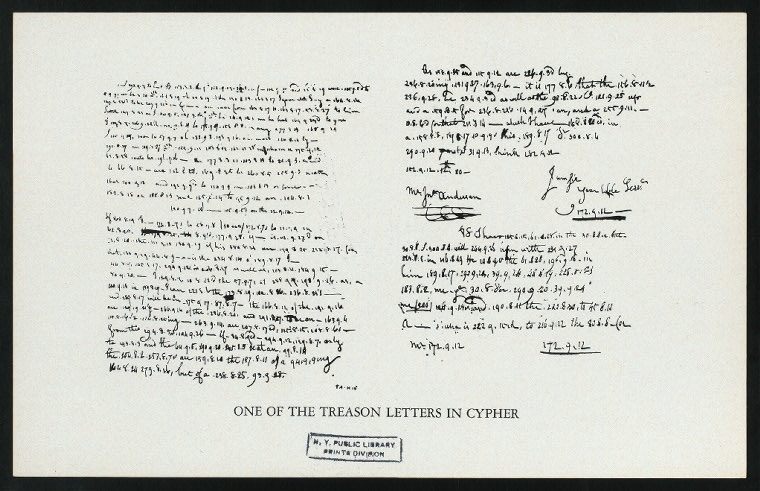
One of Arnold's coded letters. Cipher lines by Arnold are interspersed with lines by his wife, Peggy.

Early in May 1779, Arnold met with Philadelphia merchant Joseph Stansbury, (Note: Stansbury's testimony before a British commission erroneously placed his meeting with Arnold in June.) who then "went secretly to New York with a tender of [Arnold's] services to Sir Henry Clinton." Stansbury ignored instructions from Arnold to involve no one else in the plot, and he crossed the British lines and visited Jonathan Odell in New York. Odell was a Loyalist working with William Franklin, the last colonial governor of New Jersey and the son of Benjamin Franklin. On May 10, Franklin introduced Stansbury to André, who had just been named the British spy chief. This was the beginning of a secret correspondence between Arnold and André, sometimes using Shippen as a willing intermediary, which culminated more than a year later with Arnold's change of sides.

André conferred with Clinton, who gave him broad authority to pursue Arnold's offer. André then drafted instructions to Stansbury and Arnold. This initial letter opened a discussion on the types of assistance and intelligence that Arnold might provide and included instructions for how to communicate in the future. Letters were to be passed through the women's circle that Arnold's wife was a part of, but only she would be aware that some letters contained instructions that were to be passed on to André, written in invisible ink, using Stansbury as the courier. The text was encoded using a scheme now known as the Arnold Cipher, which used Commentaries on the Laws of England by William Blackstone as a cryptographic key.

By July 1779, Arnold was providing the British with troop locations and strengths, as well as the locations of supply depots, all the while negotiating over compensation. At first, he asked for indemnification of his losses and £10,000 (equivalent to £1,504,000 in 2025), an amount that Congress had given Charles Lee for his services in the Continental Army. Clinton was pursuing a campaign to gain control of the Hudson River Valley, and was interested in plans and information on the defenses of West Point and other installations on the Hudson River. He also began to insist on a face-to-face meeting and suggested to Arnold that he pursue another high-level command. By October 1779, the negotiations had ground to a halt. Furthermore, revolutionary mobs were scouring Philadelphia for Loyalists, and Arnold and the Shippen family were being threatened. Arnold was rebuffed by Congress and by local authorities in requests for security details for himself and his in-laws.

=== Court martial ===
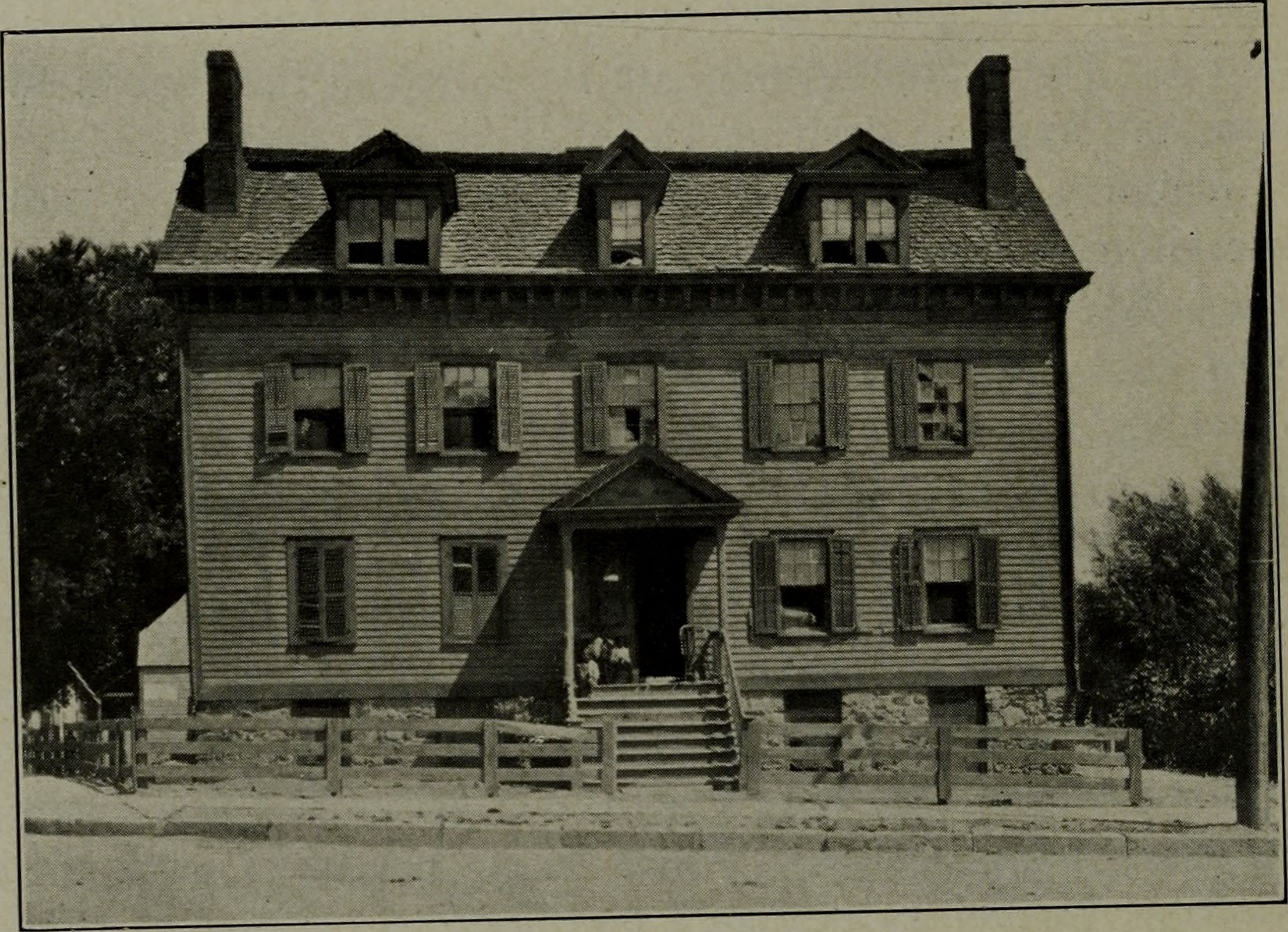
The Arnold Tavern, in Morristown, New Jersey, where the trial took place

Arnold's court-martial on charges of profiteering began meeting on June 1, 1779, but it was delayed until December by Clinton's capture of Stony Point, New York, throwing the army into a flurry of activity to react. Several members on the panel of judges were ill-disposed toward Arnold over actions and disputes earlier in the war, yet Arnold was cleared of all but two minor charges on January 26, 1780. Arnold worked over the next few months to publicize this fact; however, Washington published a formal rebuke of his behavior in early April, just one week after he had congratulated Arnold on the birth of his son, Edward Shippen Arnold, on March 19:

The Commander-in-Chief would have been much happier on an occasion of bestowing commendations on an officer who had rendered such distinguished services to his country as Major General Arnold; but in the present case, a sense of duty and a regard to candor oblige him to declare that he considers his conduct [in the convicted actions] as imprudent and improper.

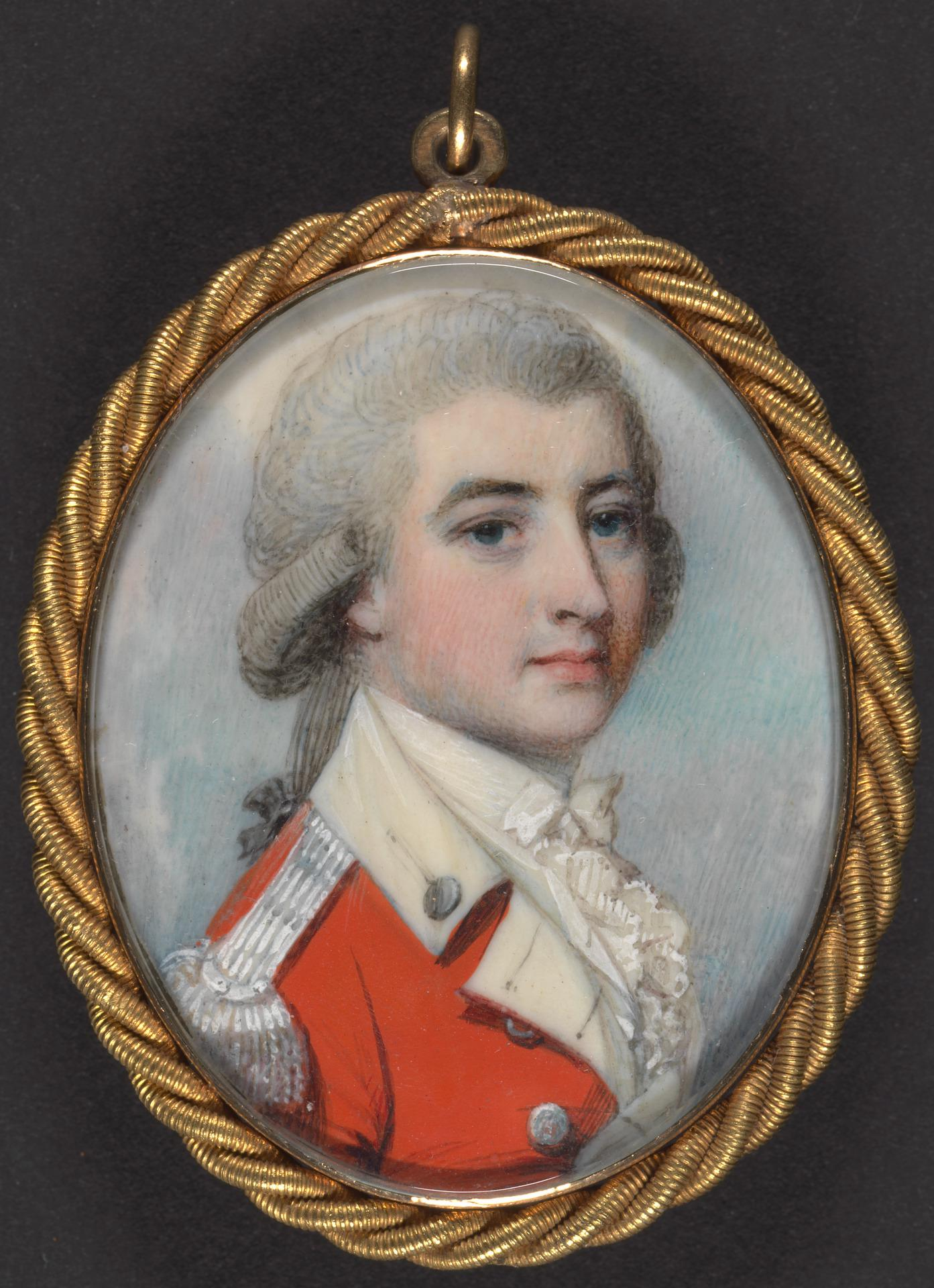
Major John André was Lieutenant General Henry Clinton's spy chief; he was captured and hanged for his role in the plot.

Shortly after Washington's rebuke, a Congressional inquiry concluded that Arnold had failed to account fully for his expenditures incurred during the Quebec invasion, and that he owed the Congress some £1,000 (equivalent to £155,000 in 2025) largely because he was unable to document them. Many of these documents had been lost during the retreat from Quebec. Angry and frustrated, Arnold resigned his military command of Philadelphia in late April.

=== Offer to surrender West Point ===
Early in April 1780, Schuyler had approached Arnold with the possibility of giving him the command at West Point. Discussions had not borne fruit between Schuyler and Washington by early June. Arnold reopened the secret channels with the British, informing them of Schuyler's proposals and including Schuyler's assessment of conditions at West Point. He also provided information on a proposed French-American invasion of Quebec that was to go up the Connecticut River (Arnold did not know that this proposed invasion was a ruse intended to divert British resources). On June 16, Arnold inspected West Point while on his way home to Connecticut to take care of personal business, and he sent a highly detailed report through the secret channel. When he reached Connecticut, Arnold arranged to sell his home there and began transferring assets to London through intermediaries in New York. By early July, he was back in Philadelphia, where he wrote another secret message to Clinton on July 7, which implied that his appointment to West Point was assured and that he might even provide a "drawing of the works ... by which you might take [West Point] without loss."

André returned victorious from the Siege of Charleston on June 18, and both he and Clinton were immediately caught up in this news. Clinton was concerned that Washington's army and the French fleet would join in Rhode Island, and he again fixed on West Point as a strategic point to capture. André had spies and informers keeping track of Arnold to verify his movements. Excited by the prospects, Clinton informed his superiors of his intelligence coup but failed to respond to Arnold's July 7 letter.

Arnold next wrote a series of letters to Clinton, even before he might have expected a response to the July 7 letter. In a July 11 letter, he complained that the British did not appear to trust him and threatened to break off negotiations unless progress was made. On July 12 he wrote again, making explicit the offer to surrender West Point, although his price rose to £20,000 (equivalent to £3,104,000 in 2025) (in addition to indemnification for his losses), with a £1,000 (equivalent to £155,000 in 2025) down payment to be delivered with the response. These letters were delivered by Samuel Wallis, another Philadelphia businessman who spied for the British, rather than by Stansbury.

=== Command at West Point ===
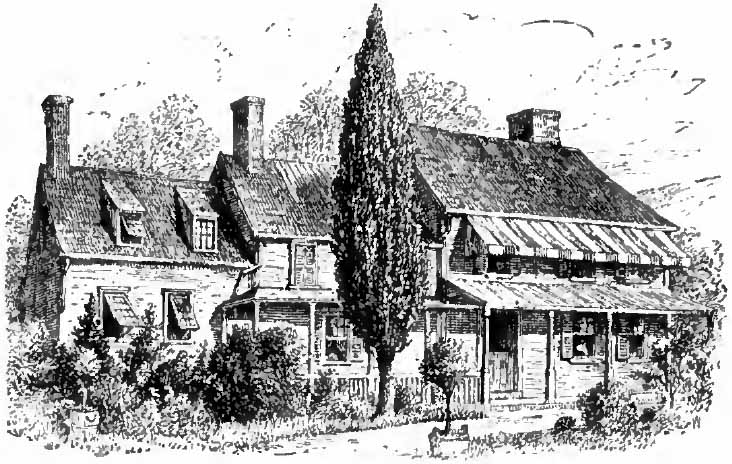
Colonel Beverley Robinson's house, Arnold's headquarters at West Point

On August 3, 1780, Arnold obtained command of West Point. On August 15, he received a coded letter from André with Clinton's final offer: £20,000 (equivalent to £3,104,000 in 2025) and no indemnification for his losses. Neither side knew for some days that the other was in agreement with that offer, due to difficulties in getting the messages across the lines. Arnold's letters continued to detail Washington's troop movements and provide information about French reinforcements that were being organized. On August 25, Shippen finally delivered to him Clinton's agreement to the terms.

Arnold's command at West Point also gave him authority over the entire American-controlled Hudson River, from Albany down to the British lines outside New York City. While en route to West Point, Arnold renewed an acquaintance with Joshua Hett Smith, who had spied for both sides and who owned a house near the western bank of the Hudson about fifteen miles south of West Point.

Once Arnold established himself at West Point, he began systematically weakening its defenses and military strength. Needed repairs of the chain across the Hudson were never ordered. Troops were liberally distributed within Arnold's command area (but only minimally at West Point itself) or furnished to Washington on request. Arnold also peppered Washington with complaints about the lack of supplies, writing, "Everything is wanting." At the same time, he tried to drain West Point's supplies so that a siege would be more likely to succeed. His subordinates, some long-time associates, grumbled about Arnold's unnecessary distribution of supplies and eventually concluded that he was selling them on the black market for personal gain.

On August 30, Arnold sent a letter accepting Clinton's terms and proposing a meeting to André through yet another intermediary: William Heron, a member of the Connecticut Assembly whom he thought he could trust. In an ironic twist, Heron went into New York unaware of the significance of the letter and offered his own services to the British as a spy. He then took the letter back to Connecticut, suspicious of Arnold's actions, where he delivered it to the head of the Connecticut militia. General Samuel Holden Parsons laid it aside, seeing a letter written as a coded business discussion. Four days later, Arnold sent a coded letter with similar content to New York through the services of the wife of a prisoner of war. Eventually, a meeting was set for September 11 near Dobbs Ferry. This meeting was thwarted when British gunboats in the river fired on Arnold's boat, not being informed of his impending arrival.

=== Plot exposed ===
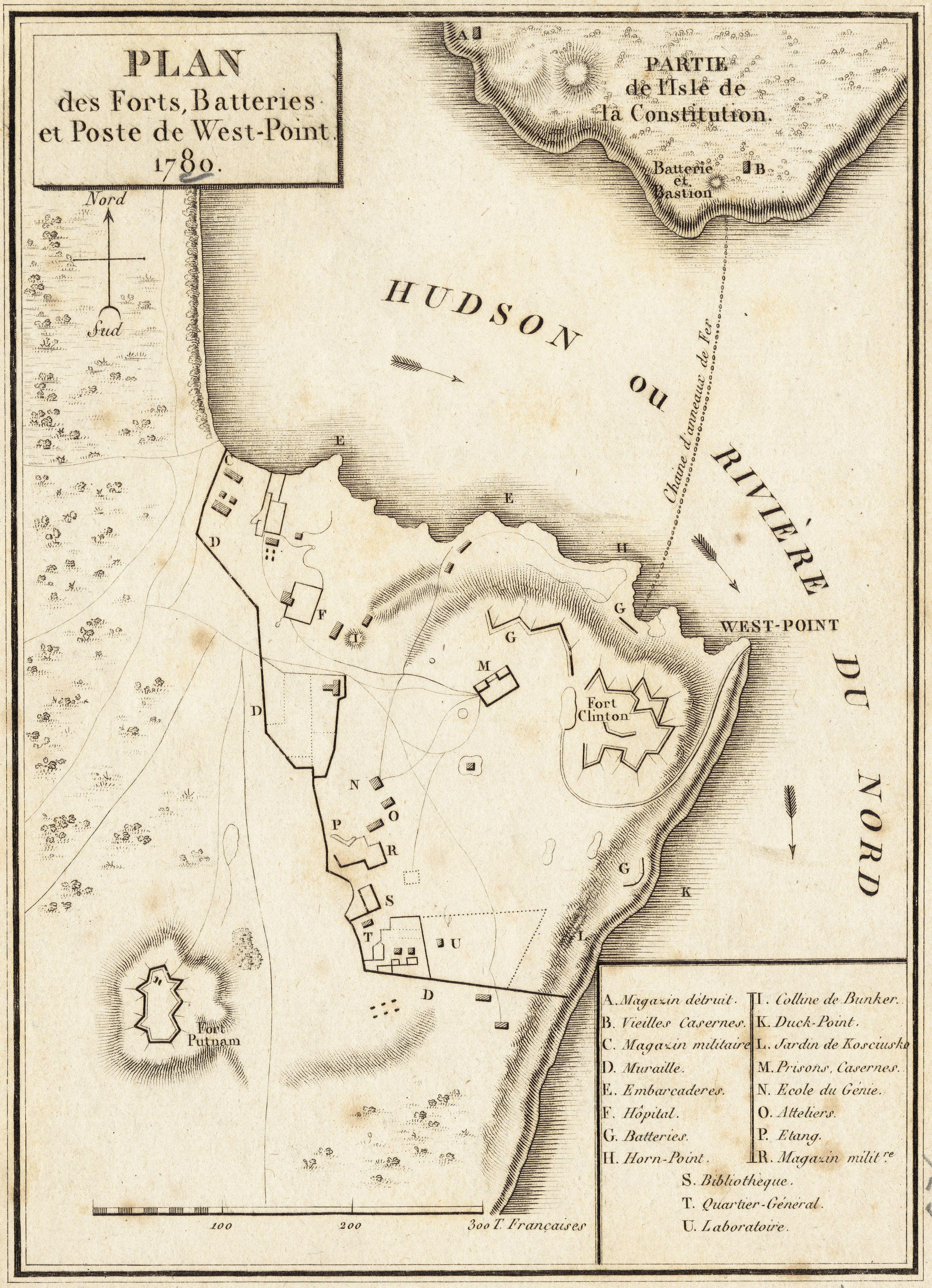
A French map of West Point in 1780

Arnold and André finally met on September 21 at the Joshua Hett Smith House. On the morning of September 22, from their position at Teller's Point, two American rebels (under the command of Colonel James Livingston), John "Jack" Peterson and Moses Sherwood, fired on HMS Vulture, the ship that was intended to carry André back to New York. This action did little damage besides giving the captain, Andrew Sutherland, a splinter in his nose—but the splinter prompted Vulture to retreat, forcing André to return to New York overland. Arnold wrote out passes for André so that he would be able to pass through the lines, and he also gave him plans for West Point.

André was captured near Tarrytown, New York, on Saturday, September 23, by three Westchester militiamen. The three men, David Williams, John Paulding, and Isaac Van Wert have largely been lost to history but were heroes in their own time, including having counties in Ohio named for them. They found the papers exposing the plot to capture West Point and passed them on to their superiors, but André convinced the unsuspecting Colonel John Jameson, to whom he was delivered, to send him back to Arnold at West Point—but he never reached his destination. Major Benjamin Tallmadge, a member of the Culper Ring and thus a senior Continental Army counterintelligence officer, insisted that Jameson order the prisoner to be intercepted and brought back. In a key move, Jameson reluctantly recalled the lieutenant who had been delivering André into Arnold's custody, but he then sent the same lieutenant as a messenger to notify Arnold of André's arrest.

Arnold learned of André's capture on the morning of September 24 while waiting for Washington, with whom he was going to have breakfast at his headquarters in British Colonel Beverley Robinson's former summer house on the east bank of the Hudson. Upon receiving Jameson's message, however, he learned that Jameson had sent Washington the papers which André was carrying. Arnold immediately hastened to the shore and ordered bargemen to row him downriver to where Vulture was anchored, fleeing on it to New York City. From the ship, he wrote a letter to Washington requesting that his wife be given safe passage to her family in Philadelphia—which Washington granted.

When Washington was presented with proof of Arnold's treason, he said, "Arnold has betrayed me. Whom can we trust now?" He remained calm when presented with the evidence, and was reportedly "the only one at West Point that day to act calmly." He did, however, investigate its extent, and suggested that he was willing to exchange André for Arnold during negotiations with Clinton concerning André's fate. Clinton refused this suggestion; after a military tribunal, André was hanged at Tappan, New York, on October 2. Washington also sent men to infiltrate New York City in an attempt to capture Arnold, which included Sergeant Major John Champe. This plan very nearly succeeded, but Arnold changed living quarters before sailing for Virginia in December and thus avoided capture. He justified his actions in an open letter titled "To the Inhabitants of America," published in newspapers in October 1780. He also wrote in the letter to Washington requesting safe passage for Shippen: "Love to my country actuates my present conduct, however it may appear inconsistent to the world, who very seldom judge right of any man's actions."

== Revolutionary War (British service) ==
=== Raids in Virginia and Connecticut colonies ===
The British gave Arnold a brigadier general's commission with an annual income of several hundred pounds, but they paid him only £6,315 (equivalent to £980,000 in 2025) plus an annual pension of £360 (equivalent to £56,000 in 2025) for his defection because his plot had failed. In December 1780, Arnold led a force of 1,600 troops into Virginia under orders from Clinton, where he captured Richmond by surprise and then went on a rampage through the colony, destroying supply houses, foundries, and mills. This activity brought out Virginia's militia led by Colonel Sampson Mathews, and Arnold eventually retreated to Portsmouth to be reinforced or to evacuate.

The pursuing American army included the Marquis de Lafayette, who was under orders from Washington to hang Arnold summarily if he was captured. British reinforcements arrived in late March, led by Major General William Phillips, who served under Burgoyne at Saratoga. Phillips led further raids across Virginia, including a defeat of Baron von Steuben at Petersburg, but he died of fever on May 12, 1781. Arnold commanded the army only until May 20, when Lieutenant General Charles Cornwallis arrived with the southern army and took over. One colonel wrote to Clinton concerning Arnold: "There are many officers who must wish some other general in command." Cornwallis ignored Arnold's advice to locate a permanent base away from the coast, advice that might have averted his surrender at Yorktown.

On his return to New York in June, Arnold made a variety of proposals for attacks on economic targets to force the Americans to end the war. Clinton was uninterested in most of his aggressive ideas, but finally authorized him to raid the port of New London, Connecticut. He led a force of more than 1,700 men, which burned most of New London to the ground on September 4, causing damage estimated at $500,000. They also attacked and captured Fort Griswold across the river in Groton, slaughtering the Americans after they surrendered following the Battle of Groton Heights—and all these deeds were done just a few miles down the Thames River from Norwich, where Arnold grew up. However, British casualties were high; nearly one quarter of the force was killed or wounded, and Clinton declared that he could ill afford any more such victories.

=== Exile in England ===
Even before Cornwallis' surrender in October, Arnold had requested permission from Clinton to go to England to give Lord George Germain his thoughts on the war in person. He renewed that request when he learned of the surrender, which Clinton then granted. On December 8, 1781, Arnold and his family left New York for England. Arnold never set foot again in the United States. In London, Arnold aligned himself with the Tories, advising Germain and King George III to renew the fight against the Americans. In the House of Commons, Edmund Burke expressed the hope that the government would not put Arnold "at the head of a part of a British army" lest "the sentiments of true honour, which every British officer [holds] dearer than life, should be afflicted." The anti-war Whigs had gained the upper hand in Parliament, and Germain was forced to resign, with the government of Lord North falling not long after.

Arnold then applied to accompany Lieutenant General Guy Carleton, who was going to New York to replace Clinton as commander-in-chief, but the request went nowhere. Other attempts by Arnold to gain positions within the government or the British East India Company all failed over the next few years, and he was forced to subsist on the reduced pay of non-wartime service. His reputation also came under criticism in the British press, especially when compared to André, who was celebrated for his patriotism. One critic said that he was a "mean mercenary, who, having adopted a cause for the sake of plunder, quits it when convicted of that charge." George Johnstone turned Arnold down for a position in the East India Company and explained: "Although I am satisfied with the purity of your conduct, the generality do not think so. While this is the case, no power in this country could suddenly place you in the situation you aim at under the East India Company."

== To New Brunswick, then back to England ==
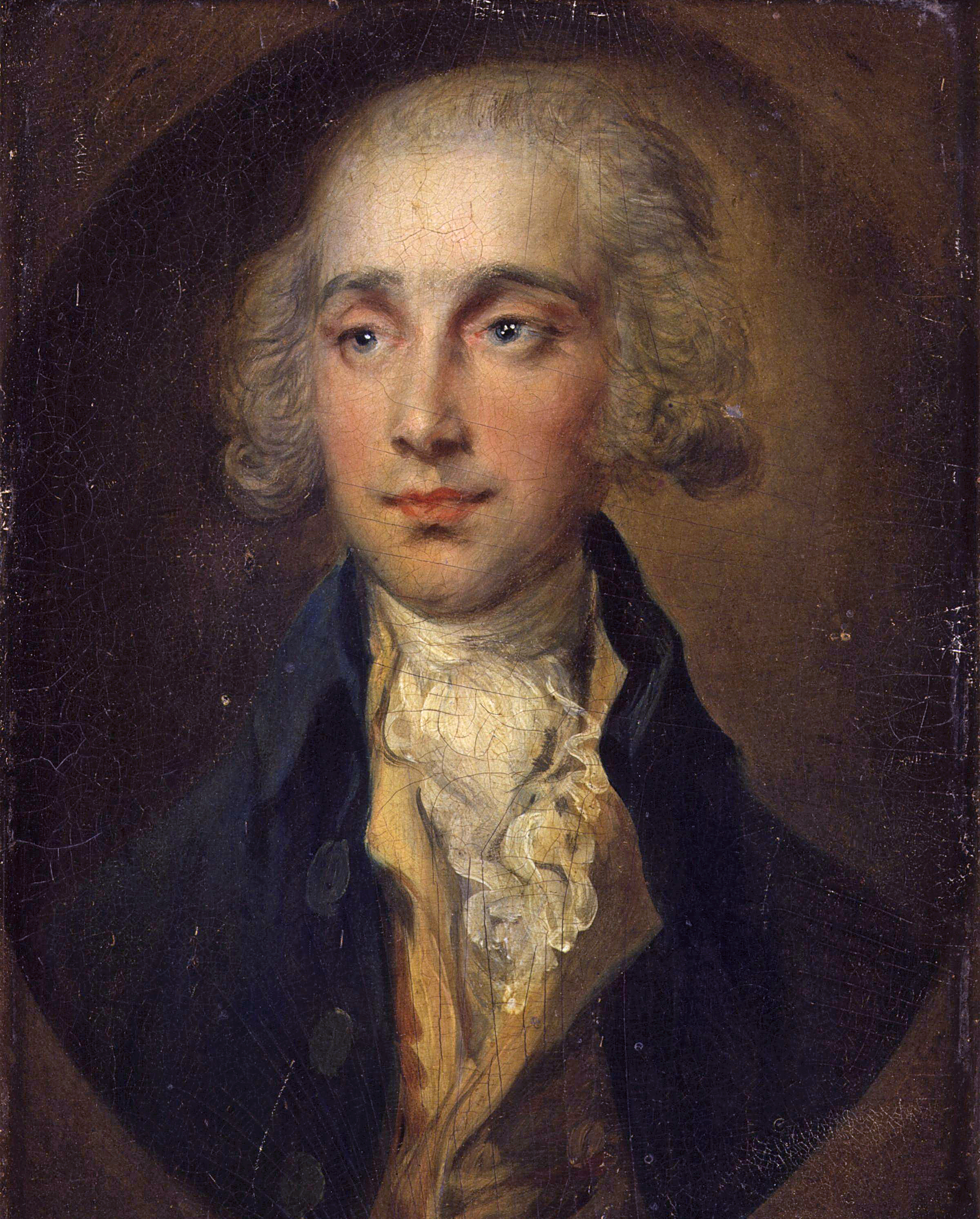
James Maitland, 8th Earl of Lauderdale, fought a duel with Arnold. Portrait by Thomas Gainsborough.

In 1785, Arnold and his son Richard moved to Saint John, New Brunswick, where they speculated in land and established a business doing trade with the West Indies. Arnold purchased large tracts of land in the Maugerville area, and acquired city lots in Saint John and Fredericton. Delivery of his first ship, the Lord Sheffield, was accompanied by accusations from the builder that Arnold had cheated him; Arnold replied that he had merely deducted the contractually agreed amount when the ship was delivered late. After her first voyage, Arnold returned to London in 1786 to bring his family to Saint John. While there, he disentangled himself from a lawsuit over an unpaid debt that Shippen had been fighting while he was away, paying £900 (equivalent to £122,000 in 2025) to settle a £12,000 (equivalent to £1,629,000 in 2025) loan that he had taken while living in Philadelphia.

The family moved to Saint John in 1787, where Arnold created an uproar with a series of bad business deals and petty lawsuits. The most serious of these was a slander suit which Arnold won against a former business partner; and following this, townspeople burned him in effigy in front of his house, as Shippen and the children watched. The family left Saint John to return to London in December 1791.

In July 1792, Arnold fought a bloodless duel with the Earl of Lauderdale after the Earl impugned his honor in the House of Lords. With the outbreak of the French Revolutionary Wars, Arnold outfitted a privateer, while continuing to do business in the West Indies, even though the hostilities increased the risk. He was imprisoned by the French colonial authorities in Guadeloupe amid accusations of spying for the British, and narrowly eluded hanging by escaping to the blockading British fleet after bribing his guards. He helped organize militia forces in the British West Indies, receiving praise from the landowners for his efforts on their behalf. Arnold hoped that this work would earn him wider respect and a new command; instead, it earned him and his sons a land-grant of 15,000 acres (6,100 ha) in Upper Canada, near present-day Renfrew, Ontario.

== Death and funeral ==
In January 1801, Arnold's health began to decline. He had suffered from gout since 1775, and the condition attacked his unwounded leg to the point where he was unable to go to sea. The other leg ached constantly, and he walked only with a cane. Physicians diagnosed Arnold as having dropsy, and a visit to the countryside only temporarily improved his condition. He died after four days of delirium on June 14, 1801, at the age of 60. Legend has it that, when he was on his deathbed, he said, "Let me die in this old uniform in which I fought my battles. May God forgive me for ever having put on another," but this story may be apocryphal. Arnold was buried at St. Mary's Church in Battersea, England. As a result of a clerical error in the parish records, his remains were removed to an unmarked mass grave during church renovations a century later. His funeral procession boasted "seven mourning coaches and four state carriages"; the funeral was without military honors.

Arnold left a small estate, reduced in size by his debts, which Shippen undertook to clear. Among his bequests were considerable gifts to one John Sage, perhaps an illegitimate son or grandson. (Note: Some historians suggested an Arnold liaison in New Brunswick, but Canadian historian Barry Wilson noted the weakness of this traditional account. Sage's gravestone indicates that he was born on April 14, 1786, a date roughly confirmed by Arnold's will, which stated that Sage was 14 when Arnold wrote it in 1800. Arnold arrived in New Brunswick in December 1785, so Sage's mother could not have been from there. Wilson believes that the explanation most consistent with the available documentation is that Sage was either the result of a liaison before Arnold left England or that he was Arnold's grandson by one of his older children.)

== Legacy ==
Benedict Arnold became permanently synonymous with "traitor" soon after his betrayal became public. Biblical themes were often invoked; one 1794 textbook stated that "Satan entered into the heart of Benedict." Benjamin Franklin wrote that "Judas sold only one man, Arnold three millions," and Alexander Scammell described Arnold's actions as "black as hell." In his hometown of Norwich, Connecticut, someone scrawled "the traitor" next to Arnold's record of birth at city hall, and all of his family's gravestones have been destroyed except his mother's.

Arnold was aware of his reputation in his home country, and French statesman Talleyrand described meeting him in Falmouth, Cornwall, in 1794:

The innkeeper at whose place I had my meals informed me that one of his lodgers was an American general. Thereupon I expressed the desire of seeing that gentleman, and, shortly after, I was introduced to him. After the usual exchange of greetings … I ventured to request from him some letters of introduction to his friends in America. "No", he replied, and after a few moments of silence, noticing my surprise, he added, "I am perhaps the only American who cannot give you letters for his own country … all the relations I had there are now broken … I must never return to the States." He dared not tell me his name. It was General Arnold.

Talleyrand continued, "I must confess that I felt much pity for him, for which political puritans will perhaps blame me, but with which I do not reproach myself, for I witnessed his agony."

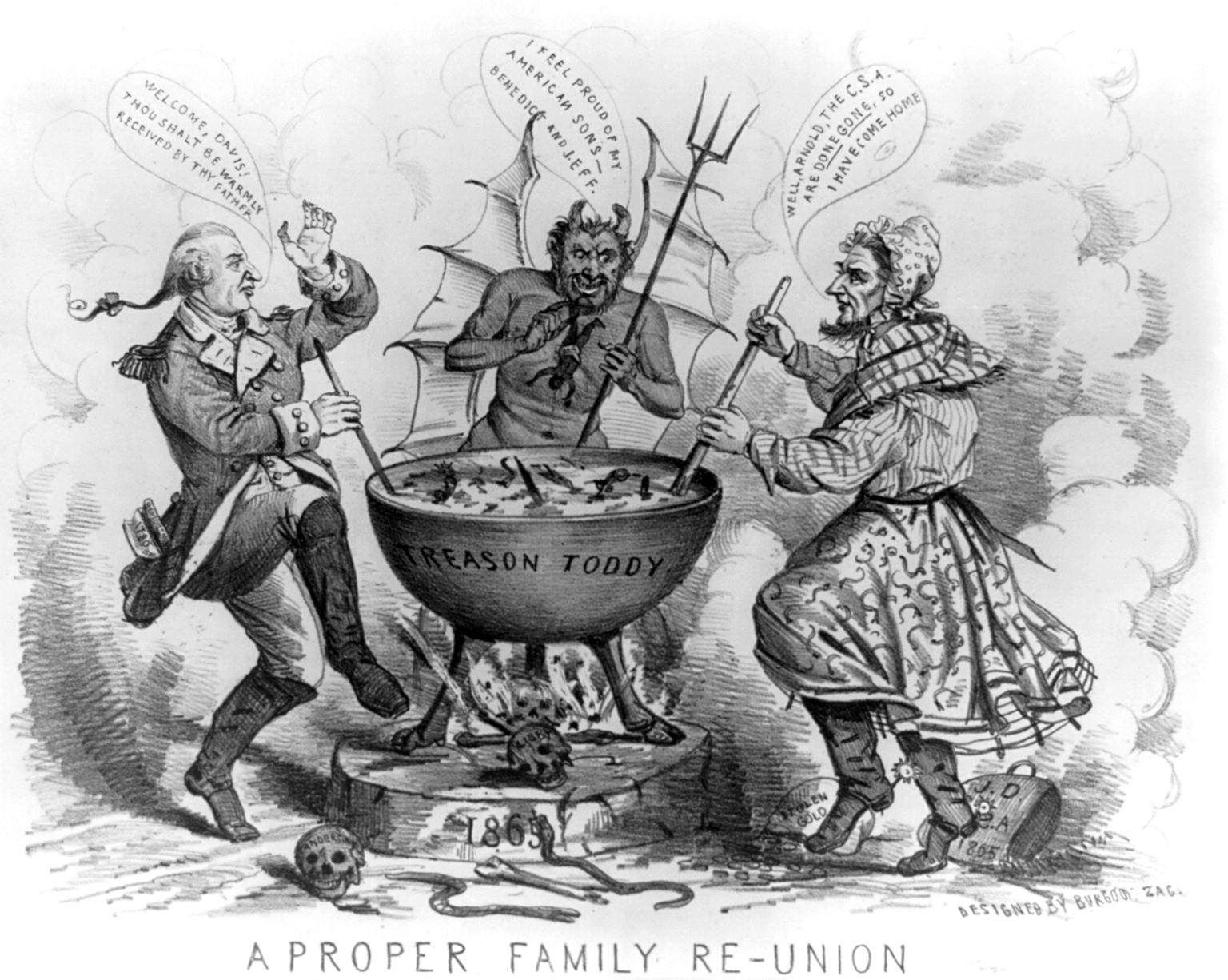
An 1865 political cartoon depicting Benedict Arnold, Jefferson Davis, and Satan in hell

Early biographers attempted to describe Arnold's entire life in terms of treacherous or morally questionable behavior. The first major biography of his life was The Life and Treason of Benedict Arnold, published in 1832 by historian Jared Sparks; it was particularly harsh in showing how Arnold's treacherous character was formed out of childhood experiences. George Canning Hill authored a series of moralistic biographies in the mid-19th century and began his 1865 biography of Arnold: "Benedict, the Traitor, was born…". Social historian Brian Carso notes that, as the 19th century progressed, the story of Arnold's betrayal was portrayed with near-mythical proportions as a part of the national history. It was invoked again as sectional conflicts increased in the years before the American Civil War. Washington Irving used it as part of an argument against dismemberment of the union in his 1857 Life of George Washington, pointing out that the unity of New England and the southern states, which led to independence, was made possible in part by holding West Point. Jefferson Davis and other southern secessionist leaders were unfavorably compared to Arnold, implicitly and explicitly likening the idea of secession to treason. Harper's Weekly published an article in 1861 describing Confederate leaders as "a few men directing this colossal treason, by whose side Benedict Arnold shines white as a saint."

Fictional invocations of Arnold's name carry strongly negative overtones. A moralistic children's tale entitled "The Cruel Boy" was widely circulated in the 19th century. It described a boy who stole eggs from birds' nests, pulled wings off insects and engaged in other sorts of wanton cruelty, who then grew up to become a traitor to his country. The boy is not identified until the end of the story, when his place of birth is given as Norwich, Connecticut, and his name is given as Benedict Arnold. However, not all depictions of Arnold were so negative. Some theatrical treatments of the 19th century explored his duplicity, seeking to understand rather than demonize it.

Canadian historians have treated Arnold as a relatively minor figure. His difficult time in New Brunswick led historians to summarize it as full of "controversy, resentment, and legal entanglements" and to conclude that he was disliked by both Americans and Loyalists living there. Historian Barry Wilson points out that Arnold's descendants established deep roots in Canada, becoming leading settlers in Upper Canada and Saskatchewan. His descendants are spread across Canada, most of all those of John Sage, who adopted the Arnold surname.

== Honors ==
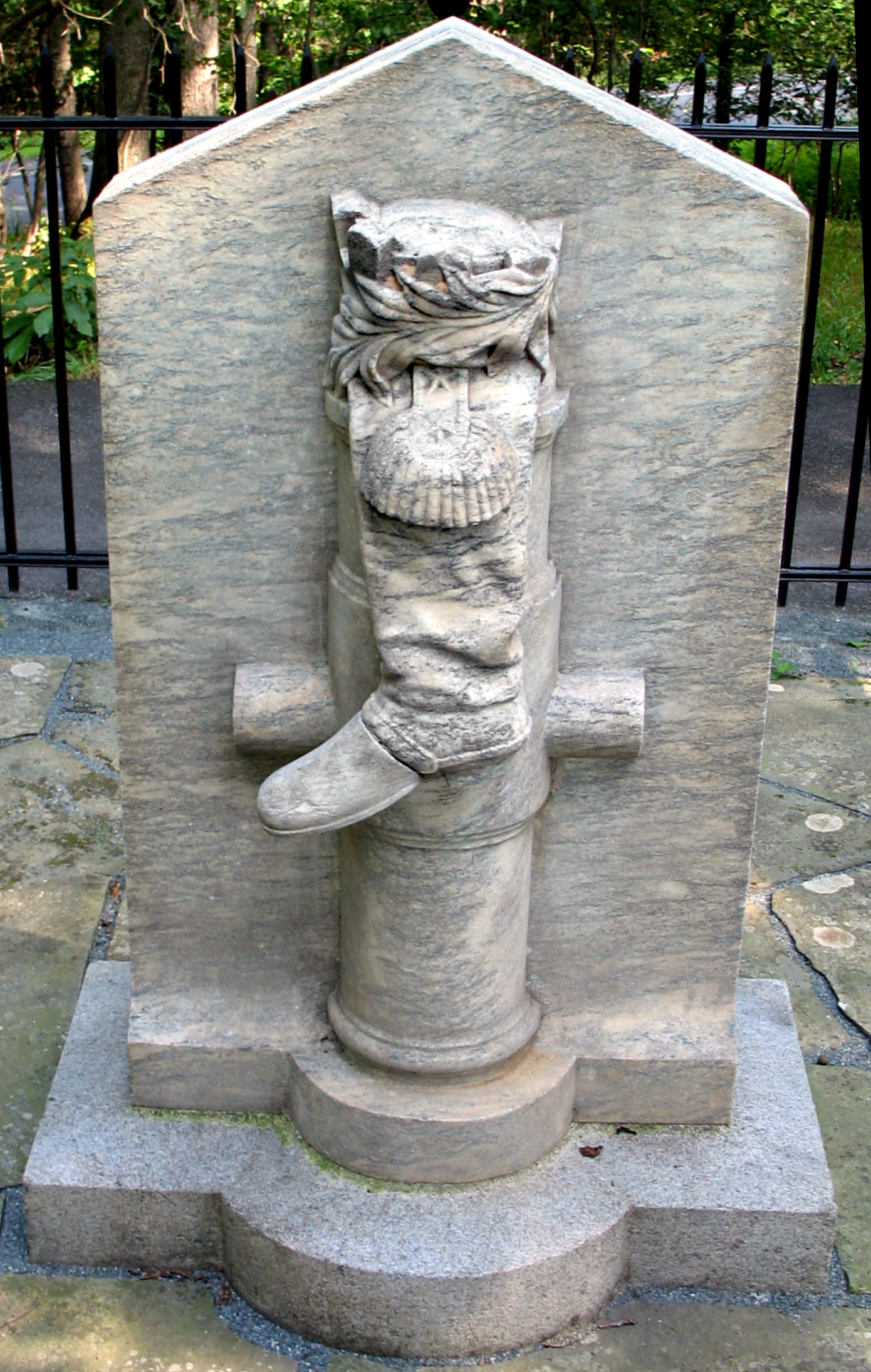
Boot Monument

The Boot Monument at Saratoga National Historical Park pays tribute to Arnold but does not mention his name. It was donated by Civil War General John Watts DePeyster, and its inscription reads: "In memory of the most brilliant soldier of the Continental army, who was desperately wounded on this spot, winning for his countrymen the decisive battle of the American Revolution, and for himself the rank of Major General." The victory monument at Saratoga has four niches, three of which are occupied by statues of Generals Gates, Schuyler and Morgan. The fourth niche is pointedly empty.

There are plaques in an old cadet chapel in the United States Military Academy at West Point commemorating all of the generals who served in the Revolution. One plaque bears only a rank and a birth year, but no name or death year: "major general… born 1740." Historical markers in Danvers, Massachusetts, and Newburyport, Massachusetts, commemorate Arnold's 1775 expedition to Quebec.

There are also historical markers bearing his name (while mentioning his treason) at Wyman Lake Rest Area on US-201 north of Moscow, Maine, on the western bank of Lake Champlain, and two in Skowhegan, Maine. A monument commemorating the Battle of Valcour Island was placed near Lake Champlain east of Peru, New York, and is the only one to bearing his name while not mentioning his treason; it was dedicated in 1928 by the members of the Saranac Chapter of the Daughters of the American Revolution.

The house where Arnold lived at 62 Gloucester Place in London bears a plaque describing him as an "American Patriot," in the sense that he "felt that what he was doing was in the interest of America." He was buried at St Mary's Church, Battersea, which has a commemorative stained glass window. The window's devices commingle the flags of the United States and the United Kingdom.

== Marriages and children ==
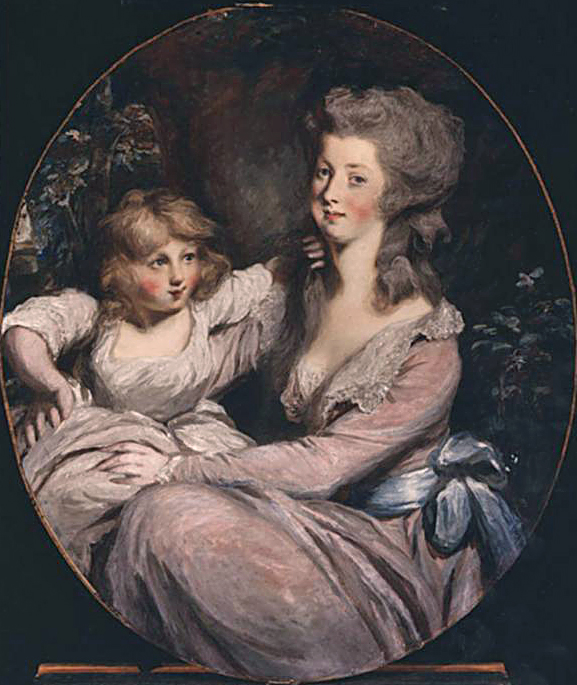
Peggy Shippen Arnold and daughter Sophia by Daniel Gardner, c. 1787

Arnold had three sons with Margaret Mansfield:

- Benedict Arnold (1768–1795) (Captain, British Army in Jamaica)
- Richard Arnold (1769–1847) (Lieutenant, American Legion cavalry)
- Henry Arnold (1772–1826) (Lieutenant, American Legion cavalry)

He had five children with Peggy Shippen:

- Edward Shippen Arnold (1780–1813) (Lieutenant, British Army in India; see Bengal Army)
- James Robertson Arnold (1781–1854) (Lieutenant General, Royal Engineers)
- George Arnold (1787–1828) (Lieutenant Colonel, 2nd (or 7th) Bengal Cavalry)
- Sophia Matilda Arnold (1785–1828)
- William Fitch Arnold (1794–1846) (Captain, 9th Queen's Royal Lancers)

Arnold left significant bequests in his will to John Sage (born 1786), who has been identified by some historians as a possible illegitimate son but may also have been a grandchild.

== Published works ==
- To the Inhabitants of America (1780)
- A Proclamation to the Officers and Soldiers of the Continental Army (1780)

== See also ==
- List of Freemasons
- List of people from Connecticut

== Works cited ==
- Arnold, Benedict (September 25, 1780). "Letter, Benedict Arnold to George Washington pleading for mercy for his wife". Library of Congress (George Washington Papers).
- Brandt, Clare (1994). The Man in the Mirror: A Life of Benedict Arnold. New York: Random House. ISBN 0-679-40106-7.
- Carso, Brian F (2006). "Whom Can We Trust Now?": the Meaning of Treason in the United States, from the Revolution Through the Civil War. Lanham, Maryland: Lexington Books. ISBN 978-0-7391-1256-4. OCLC 63692586.
- Desjardin, Thomas A (2006). Through a Howling Wilderness: Benedict Arnold's March to Quebec, 1775. New York: St. Martin's Press. ISBN 0-312-33904-6. Archived from the original on March 3, 2024.
- Fahey, Curtis (1983). "Arnold, Benedict". In Halpenny, Francess G. (ed.). Dictionary of Canadian Biography. Vol. V (1801–1820) (online ed.). University of Toronto Press.
- Flexner, James Thomas (1953). The Traitor and the Spy: Benedict Arnold and John André. New York: Harcourt Brace. OCLC 426158.
- Hill, George Canning (1865). Benedict Arnold. Philadelphia: J.B. Lippincott. p. 12. OCLC 22419760. "Benedict Arnold Hill."
- Johnson, Clifton (1915). "The Picturesque Hudson". MacMillan. Archived from the original on December 23, 2008.
- Howe, Archibald (1908). Colonel John Brown, of Pittsfield, Massachusetts, the Brave Accuser of Benedict Arnold. Boston: W. B. Clarke. Archived from the original on March 5, 2016.
- Lomask, Milton (October 1967). "Benedict Arnold: The Aftermath of Treason". American Heritage Magazine. Archived from the original on April 5, 2008.
- Lossing, Benson John (1852). The Pictorial Field-book of the Revolution. Harper & Brothers. Archived from the original on December 17, 2023.
- Martin, James Kirby (1997). Benedict Arnold: Revolutionary Hero (An American Warrior Reconsidered). New York University Press. ISBN 0-8147-5560-7. Archived from the original on March 3, 2024.
- Morrissey, Brendan (2000). Saratoga 1777: Turning Point of a Revolution. Oxford: Osprey Publishing. ISBN 978-1-85532-862-4.
- Murphy, Jim (2007). The Real Benedict Arnold. New York: Houghton Mifflin Harcourt. ISBN 978-0-395-77609-4. OCLC 85018164. Archived from the original on March 3, 2024.
- Nelson, James L. (2006). Benedict Arnold's Navy: The Ragtag Fleet that Lost the Battle of Lake Champlain But Won the American Revolution. Camden, Maine: McGraw-Hill Professional. ISBN 978-0-07-146806-0.
- New England Historic Genealogical Society (1996). The New England Register 1880. Heritage Books. ISBN 978-0-7884-0431-3. OCLC 0788404318. Archived from the original on March 3, 2024.
- Price, Richard (1984). John Lothropp: A Puritan Biography And Genealogy. Salt Lake City: R.W. Price & Associates.
- Randall, Willard Sterne (1990). Benedict Arnold: Patriot and Traitor. William Morrow and Inc. ISBN 1-55710-034-9. Archived from the original on March 3, 2024.
- Roth, Philip A. (1995) [1927]. Masonry in the Formation of Our Government 1761–1799. Kessinger Publishing. ISBN 978-1-56459-527-0. OCLC 48996481.
- Showman, Richard, ed. (1983). The Papers of General Nathanael Greene. Chapel Hill: University of North Carolina Press. ISBN 0-8078-1557-8.
- Shy, John. "Arnold, Benedict", American National Biography (1999) short scholarly biography
- Smith, Justin Harvey (1903). Arnold's March from Cambridge to Quebec. New York: G.P. Putnams Sons. OCLC 1013608. This book includes a reprint of Arnold's diary of his march.
- Smith, Justin Harvey (1975) [1907]. Our Struggle for the Fourteenth Colony: Canada, and the American Revolution. Vol. 1. New York: G.P. Putnam's Sons. ISBN 9780306706332. OCLC 259236.
- Wilson, Barry K (2001). Benedict Arnold: A Traitor in Our Midst. McGill Queens Press. ISBN 0-7735-2150-X. This book is about Arnold's time in Canada, both before and after his treachery.
- "Blue and Green Plaques". The Portman Estate. Archived from the original on October 26, 2009.
- "Edward Shippen (1729–1806)". University of Pennsylvania. Archived from the original on June 13, 2010.
- "traitor". Roget's 21st Century Thesaurus (Third ed.). Philip Lief Group. 2008.
- "Saratoga National Historical Park – Activities". National Park Service. Archived from the original on November 6, 2009.
- "Saratoga National Historical Park – Tour Stop 7". National Park Service. Archived from the original on February 28, 2009.
- Vital Records of Norwich, 1659–1848. Norwich, Connecticut: Hartford Society of Colonial Wars in the State of Connecticut. 1913. p. 153. OCLC 1850353.

Military offices
New command	Commanding Officer of the American Legion; 1780–1783	Command disbanded
