= Boot Monument =

American Revolutionary War memorial

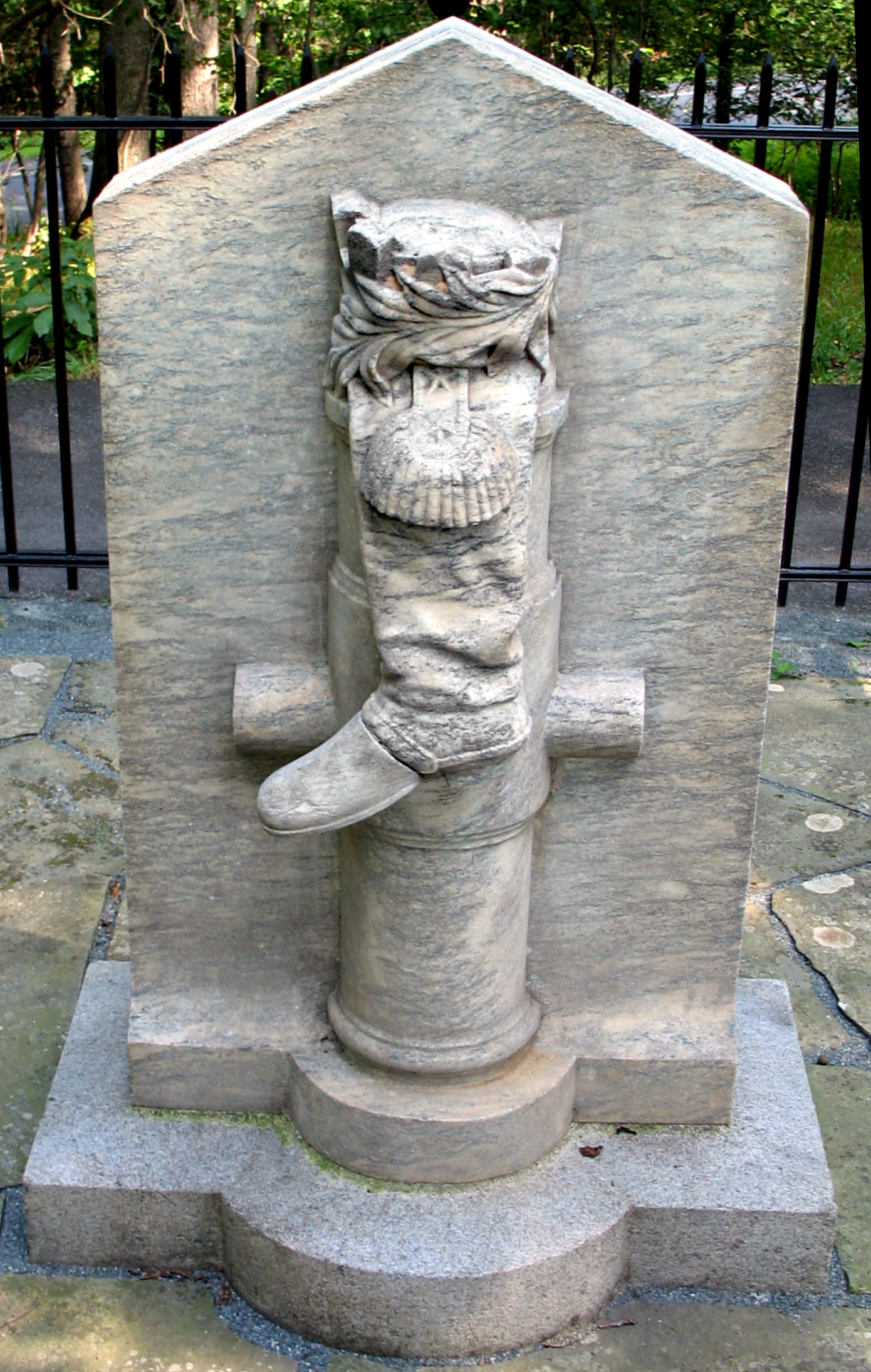
- Monument to Benedict Arnold's injured leg at Saratoga National Historical Park
- Interactive map of Boot Monument
- Location: Saratoga National Historical Park
- Coordinates: 43°0′30.2″N 73°38′21.7″W
- Designer: George Edwin Bissell
- Dedicated to: Benedict Arnold, although it does not mention his name

The Boot Monument is an American Revolutionary War memorial located in Saratoga National Historical Park, New York. Erected during 1887 by John Watts de Peyster and sculpted by George Edwin Bissell, it commemorates Major General Benedict Arnold's service at the Battles of Saratoga while in the Continental Army, but he is not named on the monument because Arnold later defected from the Americans to the British. Instead, the monument commemorates Arnold as the "most brilliant soldier of the Continental Army".

While fighting at the Battle of Bemis Heights, the second of the Saratoga engagements, Arnold was shot and severely injured in his left leg. His horse was also hit by gunfire and fell on Arnold, crushing his already injured leg. After this, Arnold continued to grow ever more bitter towards the Continental Army when he was passed over for promotion and was court-martialed. He later attempted to help the British capture the fortification of West Point but was discovered and fled to the British army.

== Background ==
American Major General Benedict Arnold contributed to both Battles of Saratoga, two crucial engagements of the American Revolutionary War that took place near Saratoga, New York. The extent of his contributions to the first battle, the Battle of Freeman's Farm, are disputed. (Note: The most accepted version of Arnold's contributions, supported by Arnold biographer James Kirby Martin, is that he led troops on the battlefield. However, former park historian John Luzader says that Arnold sent orders from headquarters.) In the second conflict, the Battle of Bemis Heights on October 7, 1777, Arnold unexpectedly joined the fighting even after disagreements between him and Major General Horatio Gates resulted in Arnold's command being removed and given to Major General Benjamin Lincoln. Gates attempted to send Arnold back to camp, but Gates's orders did not reach Arnold until the battle was over. Arnold led the American Continental Army in taking a redoubt commanded by Lord Balcarres. At the end of the conflict, Arnold's left leg and horse were shot. When the horse fell, Arnold's leg shattered. Arnold refused to have his leg amputated and instead had it faultily set.

Gates did not make much mention of Arnold's contributions in his report of the aftermath of the battle, which angered Arnold. In addition, he was further embittered by his combat wounds, by not having been promoted by Congress, and by eight court-martial charges of abusing his role as military commander of Philadelphia. These troubles, along with the fact that his wife, Peggy Shippen, came from a family of Loyalists, caused Arnold to start communicating with the British. British General Sir Henry Clinton offered Arnold £20,000 (equivalent to £3,104,000 in 2025) for the capture of West Point, a fortification that was important to the control of the Hudson River. Arnold met with British Major John André so he could pass on information on how to best attack West Point. André was captured on his way back to New York and the plans for the West Point attack were discovered. Arnold fled to New York City to join the British army and remained as a general there until the war ended in 1783.

== History ==
After years of financial problems that delayed the creation of the Saratoga Battle Monument, the Saratoga Monument Association (SMA), a group formed to discuss the creation of a monument for the Battles of Saratoga, held a meeting in July 1882. During the meeting, there was an announcement by Ellen Hardin Walworth, chairman of the Committee of Tablets, that the spot where Arnold injured his leg was marked by a stake, as a historical marker. No one at the meeting objected to the stake being placed.

John Watts de Peyster, a military historian, former major general in the Union Army, and a vice president of the SMA, wanted to commemorate Arnold's contribution to the Continental Army's victory in the battle. He was unsatisfied that the niche on the Saratoga Battle Monument where a statue of Arnold should have gone would remain empty. De Peyster considered Arnold a traitor but still recognized his contributions at Saratoga. According to Arnold biographer Jim Murphy, he wanted to "honor some of Arnold's deeds without honoring the man" but thought that simply a slab of granite to commemorate Arnold "would not do."

De Peyster decided on a boot for the monument because he had heard of a story where Arnold asked an American he met in London what the Americans thought of him, to which the American said that they would make a monument out of Arnold's leg and hang the rest of his body in effigy. The historian Michael L. Lear said that he decided on Arnold's boot as a suitable monument because "the leg was the only part of Arnold not to later turn traitor and since it was sacrificed in winning the battle of Saratoga, it should be commemorated." He commissioned George Edwin Bissell, who had designed other statues that de Peyster had erected, to sculpt a marker in white marble. The monument was then erected during 1887 in Saratoga National Historical Park. It is the only monument to Arnold in the United States and the only monument in Saratoga National Historical Park that does not show the name of its honoree.

The toe of the Boot Monument was hammered off and stolen by college boys on a visit; they kept the toe for years as a souvenir. They were only discovered when an anonymous informer (described as "a graduate of a New York State educational institution") told the battlefield official in 1931 that the toe had been stolen. The monument underwent restoration after Adolph S. Ochs, publisher of The New York Times, financed it.

The monument was originally located further to the north at the top of the hill at the Breymann Redoubt site, but after further research as to where Arnold injured his leg, the monument was moved south to where the main fortifications of the redoubt were. The time at which this happened is disputed with some sources saying 1975 while others say 1972. The monument was still at the Breymann Redoubt before the time of its move and is still at the southern end of the redoubt.

== Appearance ==
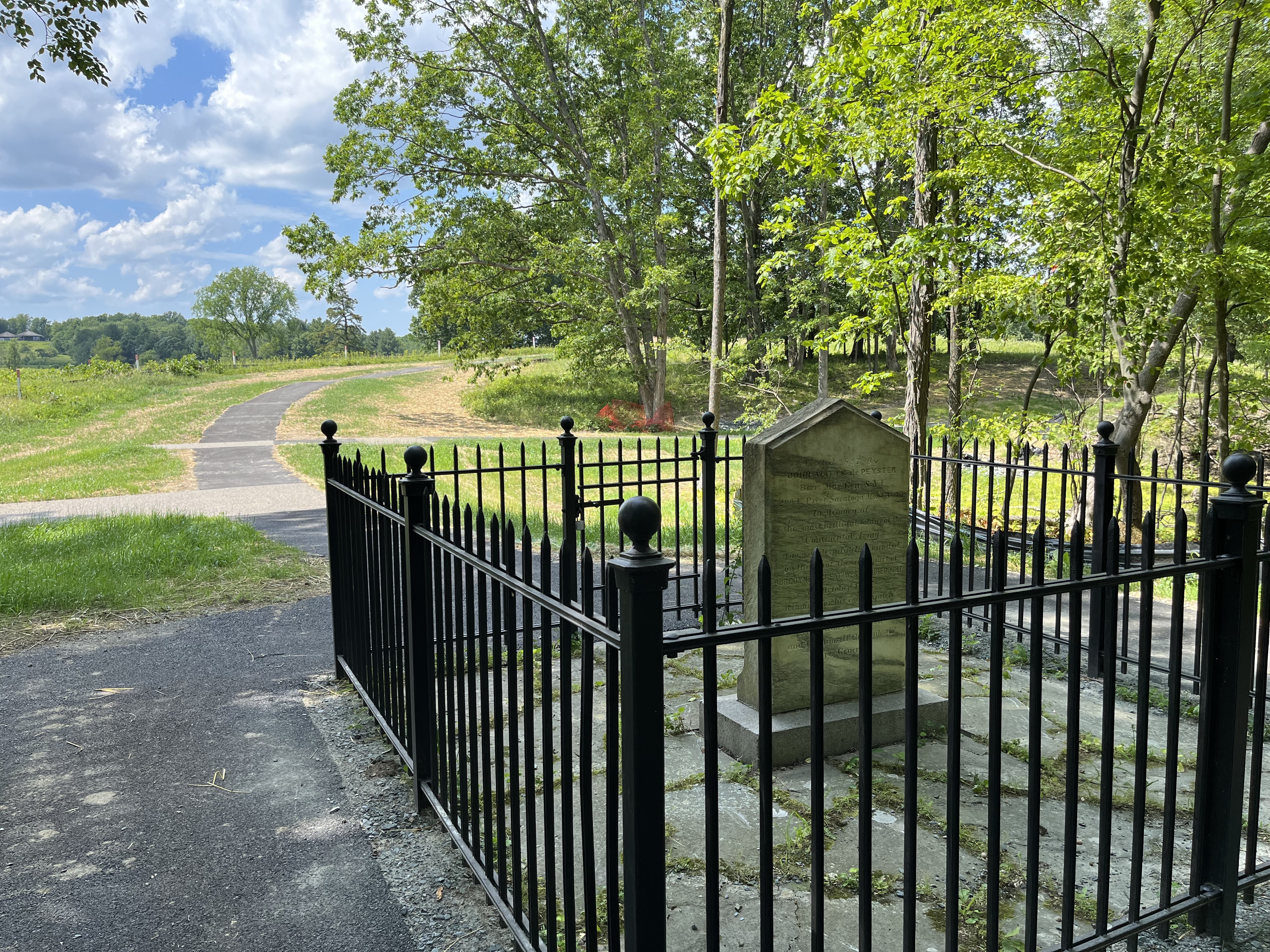
The reverse of the Boot Monument, where the inscription is written

The monument is made of white marble and is 4 feet (1.2 m) tall. Because of Arnold's defection to the British it does not mention him by name, (Note: An example of damnatio memoriae — Latin for "condemnation of memory") and De Peyster was worried that the monument would be defaced if it mentioned Arnold directly. It features a howitzer barrel with a left-footed horseman's riding boot and a two-star epaulette on top of the barrel, representing a Major General. A laurel wreath sits atop the howitzer. As a sign of dishonor, the howitzer barrel is pointed downwards. One error in the inscription is that Arnold did not earn the rank of Major General after, and because of, Saratoga, but he became more senior than the other officers who had been promoted before him. The inscription was edited after its erection to say "erected 1887 by" before De Peyster's name to make it clear that he is not the honoree of the boot. The monument faces the battlefield.

The inscription on the monument reads:

Erected 1887 By
JOHN WATTS de PEYSTER
Brev: Maj: Gen: S.N.Y.
2nd V. Pres't Saratoga Mon't Ass't'n: (Note: Brevet Major General, state of New York, second vice president of the Saratoga Monument Association)
In memory of
the "most brilliant soldier" of the
Continental Army
who was desperately wounded
on this spot the sally port of
BURGOYNES GREAT (WESTERN) REDOUBT
7th October, 1777
winning for his countrymen
the decisive battle of the
American Revolution
and for himself the rank of
Major General.

As with the absence of Arnold's name from the Boot Monument, the Saratoga Battle Monument honors Gates, General Philip Schuyler, Colonel Daniel Morgan, and Arnold, but the place where Arnold's statue should stand in the monument is an empty niche. In an old cadet chapel at West Point, Revolutionary War generals are honored with a plaque on the wall, but Arnold's plaque does not have his name and death date on it, and only says "major general… born 1740."

== See also ==
- Stonewall Jackson's arm
- Daniel Sickles's leg
- Golden Gumboot
- "To the Inhabitants of America" – letter by Benedict Arnold justifying his actions for switching sides
- Benedict Arnold's expedition to Quebec
- John Champe – Continental soldier who stayed in the British Army in a failed plan to capture Arnold

== Works cited ==
- Ayres, Thomas (2008). A Military Miscellany: From Bunker Hill to Baghdad: Important, Uncommon, and Sometimes Forgotten Facts, Lists, and Stories from America's Military History. New York, New York: Random House Publishing Group. ISBN 978-0-553-80440-9.
- Brandt, Clare (1993). The Man in the Mirror: A Life of Benedict Arnold (1st ed.). New York, New York: Random House. ISBN 978-0-679-40106-3.
- Ducharme, Lori J.; Fine, Gary Alan (June 1995). "The Construction of Nonpersonhood and Demonization: Commemorating the Traitorous Reputation of Benedict Arnold". Social Forces. 73 (4). Chapel Hill, North Carolina: 1309–1331. doi:10.2307/2580449. JSTOR 2580449. Archived from the original on May 4, 2024.
- Duling, Ennis (July 29, 2021). Thirteen Charges Against Benedict Arnold: The Accusations of Colonel John Brown Prior to the Act of Treason. Jefferson, North Carolina: McFarland & Company. ISBN 978-1-4766-4360-1. Archived from the original on March 7, 2024.
- Griswold, William A.; Linebaugh, Donald W. (2016). The Saratoga Campaign: Uncovering an Embattled Landscape. Lebanon, New Hampshire: University Press of New England. ISBN 978-1-61168-965-5. Archived from the original on March 2, 2024.
- Holmes, Timothy; Smith-Holmes, Libby (2012). Saratoga: America's Battlefield. Charleston, South Carolina: Arcadia Publishing. ISBN 978-1-61423-566-8. Archived from the original on March 3, 2024.
- Ketchum, Richard M. (1997). Saratoga: Turning Point of America's Revolutionary War. New York, New York: Henry Holt and Company. ISBN 978-0-8050-6123-9.
- Luzader, John F. (2008). Saratoga: A Military History of the Decisive Campaign of the American Revolution (1st ed.). New York, New York: Savas Beatie. ISBN 978-1-932714-44-9.
- Martin, James Kirby (1997). Benedict Arnold, Revolutionary Hero: An American Warrior Reconsidered. New York, New York: New York University Press. ISBN 0814755607.
- Murphy, Jim (2007). The Real Benedict Arnold. New York, New York: Houghton Mifflin Harcourt. ISBN 978-0-395-77609-4.
- Nickerson, Hoffman (1928). The Turning Point of the Revolution; Or, Burgoyne in America. Boston, Massachusetts and New York, New York: Houghton Mifflin. ISBN 9780598750549.
- Palmer, Dave Richard (2006). George Washington and Benedict Arnold: A Tale of Two Patriots. Washington, D.C.: Regnery Publishing. ISBN 978-1-59698-020-4.
- Philbrick, Nathaniel (2016). Valiant Ambition: George Washington, Benedict Arnold, and the Fate of the American Revolution. New York, New York: Penguin Books. ISBN 9781594139710.
- Randall, Willard Sterne (1990). Benedict Arnold: Patriot and Traitor (1st ed.). New York, New York: William Morrow and Company. ISBN 978-1-55710-034-4.
- Strange, Carolyn (April 2015). "The Battlefields of Personal and Public Memory: Commemorating the Battle of Saratoga (1777) in the Late Nineteenth Century". The Journal of the Gilded Age and Progressive Era. 14 (2). Cambridge, England: 194–221. doi:10.1017/S1537781414000796. S2CID 162888801.
- Tonsetic, Robert L. (July 19, 2013). Special Operations in the American Revolution. Haverton, Pennsylvania and Oxford, England: Casemate Publishers. ISBN 978-1-61200-165-4.
- Williams, Marie Danielle Annette (2013). The Revolutionary War in the Adirondacks: Raids in the Wilderness. Charleston, South Carolina: Arcadia Publishing. ISBN 978-1-4396-7023-1.
