= Hannah Arnold (née Waterman) =

Mother of Benedict Arnold

- Born: Hannah Waterman c. ~1705/6? Norwich, Connecticut, British America
- Died: August 15, 1758 (aged 52); Norwich, Connecticut, British America
- Burial place: Old Uptown Burying Ground, Norwich, Connecticut; 41°32′58.2″N 72°05′32.1″W
- Spouse: Captain Benedict Arnold (m. 1733)
- Children: Brigadier General Benedict Arnold (son)
- Parents: John Waterman; Elizabeth Waterman

Hannah Arnold (née Waterman; c. 1705/06? – August 15, 1758) was the mother of American-born British Brigadier General Benedict Arnold (1741–1801).

== Early life and marriages ==
Hannah Arnold was born in Norwich, Connecticut, to John Waterman and Elizabeth Lathrop. Her first husband, Absalom King, was a wealthy merchant who had settled in the area. The couple had a daughter, also named Hannah. Not long after, however, King died at sea from the smallpox. Hannah married again, this time to Captain Benedict Arnold, the descendant of Rhode Island governor Benedict Arnold. The Arnolds had six children. As was not unusual at the time, most of the couple's children died young, many within months of one another due to a yellow fever outbreak, including an older son, Benedict. A younger son, also named Benedict, was born in 1741. Shortly thereafter, market downturns caused hardships in the family finances.

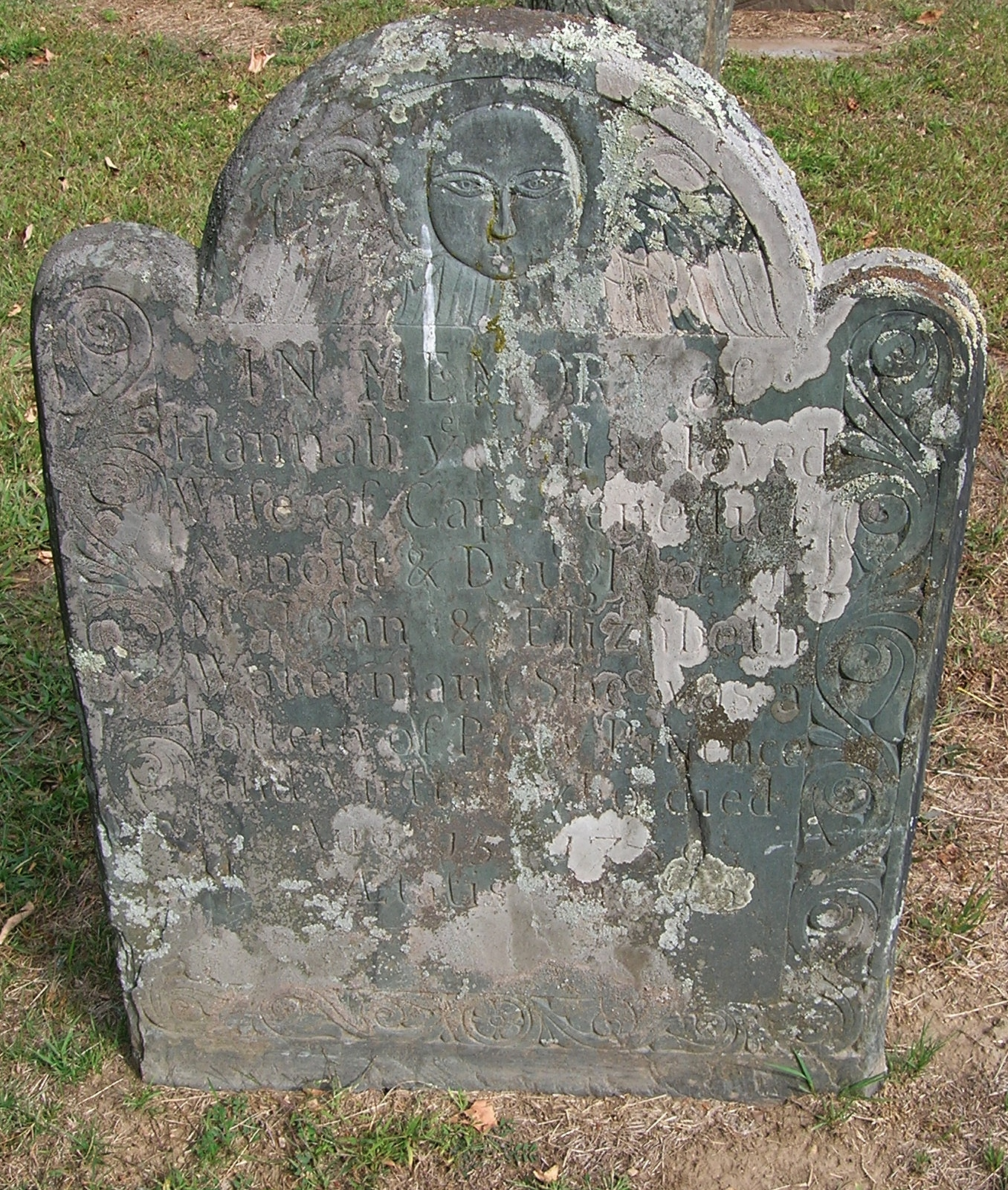
Hannah Arnold's gravestone

== Later life and death ==
Hannah Arnold died on August 15, 1758, and was buried in the Old Uptown Burying Ground, Norwich, Connecticut. Hannah's death fell hard on her widowed husband, Captain Benedict Arnold, who lingered some time and suffered with alcoholism and depression. He died in 1761.

== Historical reputation and legacy ==
Hannah Arnold is remembered in Norwich as a worthy woman and a model of "piety, patience, and virtue." Her gravestone is still visible in Norwichtown Burying Grounds, yet no one knows who paid for it.

== Children ==
Arnold had nine children:

- Benedict Arnold (1738–1739); died at age one
- Benedict Arnold (1741–1801); died at age sixty
- Hannah Arnold (1742–1803); died at age sixty-one
- Mary Arnold (1745–1753); died at age eight
- Absalom King Arnold (1747–1750); died at age three
- Elizabeth Arnold (1749–1753); died at age three

+ Absalom King Arnold (22 Oct 1750, soon died) + Mary Arnold (Sep 1753-c. 1754) + Elizabeth Arnold (Sep 1755-bef. 1765)
