= Thomas A. Desjardin =

American historian (born 1964)

Thomas Desjardin
- Born: June 10, 1964 (age 62); Lewiston, Maine, U.S.
- Education: Florida State University; University of Maine
- Known for: American Civil War historian, Maine Commissioner of Education

Thomas A. (Tom) Desjardin (born June 10, 1964) is an American historian. He has published books on the American Civil War (including two monographs on Joshua Chamberlain) and American Revolutionary War. He also was director of Maine's State Park system, and was Maine's Commissioner of the Department of Education. He was born at St. Mary's Hospital, now Saint Mary's Regional Medical Center (Maine) in Lewiston, Maine.

== Academic career ==
Desjardin earned a bachelor's degree in government and a master's degree in communication from Florida State University, where he was a member of Phi Gamma Delta fraternity. He earned a Ph.D. in U.S. History from the University of Maine and has taught at his alma mater (FSU), at Bowdoin College, and the University of Maine. He is also a former fellow at the Gilder Lehrman Institute of American History in New York City.

== Career ==
A former archivist/historian at Gettysburg National Military Park, much of his historical research has been devoted to Joshua Lawrence Chamberlain, on the mythology of the Gettysburg story, and Maine history. His work was twice nominated for the prestigious Lincoln Prize. Desjardin has appeared in nationally televised documentaries numerous times and was the historical consultant for actor Jeff Daniels in his role as Chamberlain in the 1993 movie Gettysburg. In a span of nearly two decades in Maine State Government he served as the Chief Historian for Maine's Department of Conservation and as the Director of Maine's Bureau of Parks and Lands. During his tenure as director, the state park system achieved all-time records in both visitation and revenue.

In 2014, Maine governor Paul LePage appointed Desjardin to serve as the state's Acting Commissioner of Education.

"I met Dr. Thomas A. Desjardin in 1992 when he was a graduate student at the University of Maine. It took me ten seconds to realize that Tom is a gifted, knowledgeable, yet skeptical student of the Gettysburg Campaign. Tom has also presented lectures to my Brandeis students (lending his wisdom as much to me as to them)." Dr. Jeffrey C. Hall, Winner of the 2017 Nobel Prize in Physiology or Medicine

== Books ==
- Stand Firm Ye Boys From Maine: The 20th Maine and the Gettysburg Campaign (Oxford University Press) ISBN 0-19-514082-6
- These Honored Dead: How the Story of Gettysburg Shaped American Memory (DaCapo Press) ISBN 0-306-81267-3
- Through A Howling Wilderness: Benedict Arnold's March to Quebec, 1775 (St. Martins Press) ISBN 0-312-33904-6
- Joshua L. Chamberlain: A Handbook (Greystone Communications) ISBN 1-892636-15-8
- Joshua L. Chamberlain: A Life in Letters (Osprey Publishing) ISBN 1-84908-559-5
- The Autobiography of Joshua L. Chamberlain (Down East Books) To be published 2024

== Television and film ==
1993 - Feature Film Gettysburg (1993 film). Historical advisor to actor Jeff Daniels - In 2011, Daniels said publicly of his role as Joshua Chamberlain: "For me, whatever people think that role was, it is because of Tom Desjardin."
1999, 2006, 2013 C-SPAN's Book TV
1999 - History Channel - Unknown Civil War series - on air historical consultant
2000 - History Channel - Joshua L. Chamberlain
2000 - A&E Network - Biography
2015 - The Gettysburg Address (film) - In Production.

== Seminole Trivia ==
While a student at FSU in 1984, Desjardin was the emcee at a pep rally and introduced the famous "Seminole War Chant" to FSU fans for the first time.

== Sources ==
- The Florida State Times https://news.fsu.edu/wp-content/uploads/2016/10/fstimes-2008-04-01.pdf
