= To the Inhabitants of America =

Open letter written by Benedict Arnold

- Created: October 7, 1780
- Presented: October 11, 1780
- Author: Benedict Arnold
- Subject: Loyalism

"To the Inhabitants of America" is an open letter written by former Continental Army Major General Benedict Arnold not long after his defection to the British side in the American Revolutionary War. The letter, dated October 7, 1780, was published in New York on October 11. In it, he explains his justification for his actions.

== Background ==
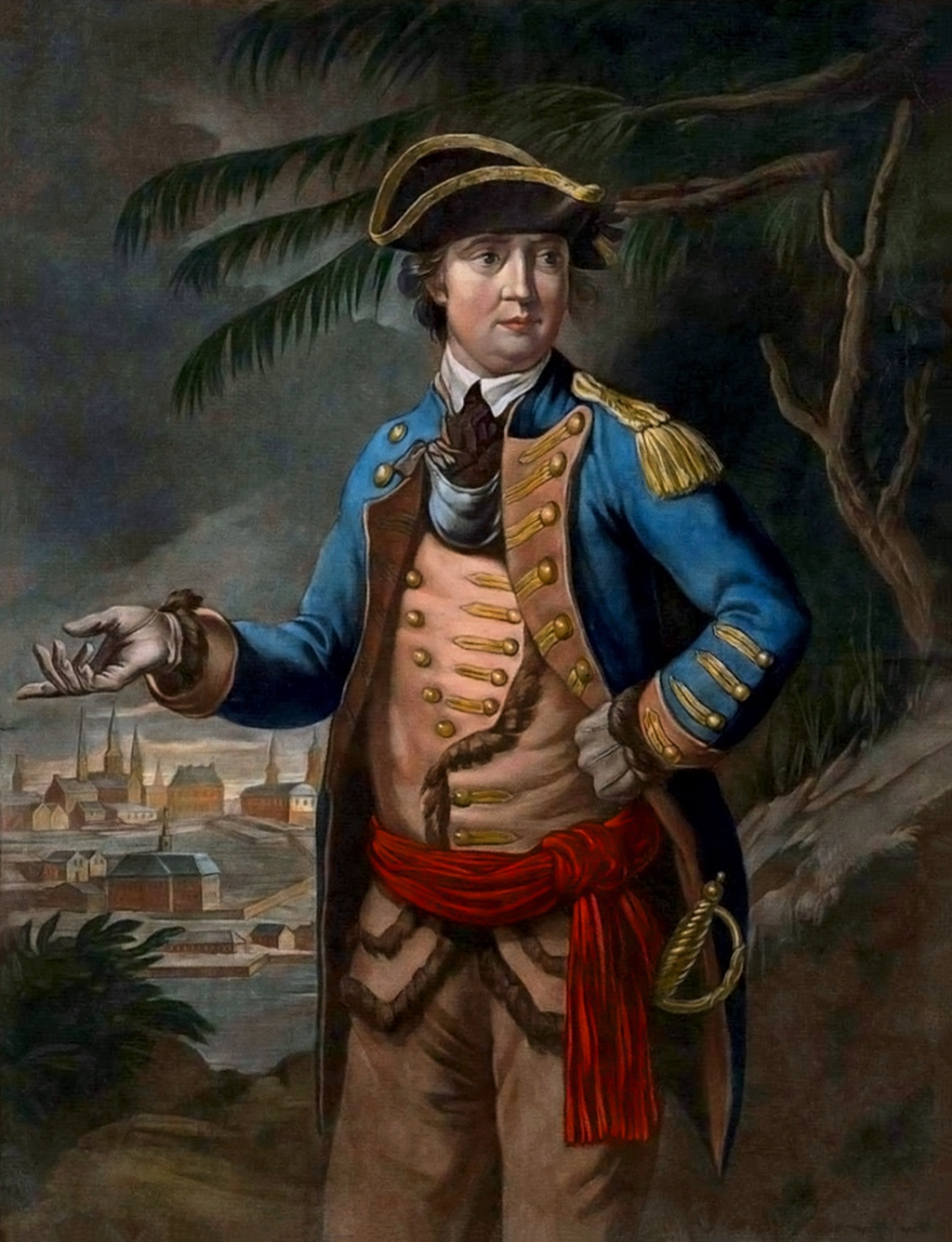
Portrait of Benedict Arnold by Thomas Hart, March 1776.

Benedict Arnold entered the American Revolution as a Patriot fighting for American independence. Arnold had many successful campaigns, and was considered by many to be the best general and most accomplished leader in the Continental Army. In September 1777, he led a division of the army commanded by Major General Horatio Gates against British Lieutenant General John Burgoyne at the Battle of Freeman's Farm. Following that battle, disagreements between Arnold and Gates boiled over, for reasons including Gates' failure to credit Arnold for his role in the battle, and Gates removed Arnold from command. In the Battle of Bemis Heights in early October, Arnold, against Gates' orders, took to the battlefield, where he played a key role in rallying the troops to attack the British position. In 1778, the American rebels formed an alliance with France, which Arnold was very much opposed to (as demonstrated by the letter). Arnold also made enemies everywhere he went, including politically well-connected military officers and members of the Second Continental Congress. Charges and countercharges between Arnold and his enemies led to multiple courts martial and investigations of Arnold's financial management of his various commands. These actions, and the influence of his second wife, Peggy Shippen, the daughter of a wealthy Philadelphia Loyalist, led Arnold to begin negotiations in 1779. On the British side, his handler was Major John André.

In July 1780, Arnold sought and obtained command of the fort at West Point. Arnold then offered to hand the fort over to the British for £20,000 and a brigadier general's commission. Arnold's plot was exposed in September 1780 when Major André was captured by American troops while carrying incriminating documents. Arnold fled to New York when he learned of André's capture; on October 2, 1780 at Tappan, the thirty-year-old André was hanged as a British spy.

== The Letter ==
To explain and justify his actions, Arnold wrote an open letter dated October 7, 1780 that was published on October 11 in New York by the Royal Gazette. This letter to "The Inhabitants of America" outlined what Arnold saw as the corruption, lies, and tyranny of the Second Continental Congress and the Patriot leadership.

Arnold said in the letter that he supported the War of Independence to get a redress of grievances. However, he argued that once Great Britain granted the redress, there was no reason to continue the war. Arnold believed this had been achieved when the British government offered terms for peace. Thus, he encouraged Americans to reject the Declaration of Independence and return to the British Empire.

Arnold also objected to the Americans' alliance with France. He thought France was too weak to establish the independence of the United States. He depicted Catholic France as "the enemy of the Protestant faith" and accused France of speaking of liberty while holding its people in bondage.

In his argument, Arnold made a plea to the "common sense" of this action. His choice of words alluded to Thomas Paine's pamphlet, Common Sense, which had been circulating in the United States since 1776.

Arnold was living in British-controlled New York when his letter was published and he had been given a commission as a British officer. The letter "To the Inhabitants of America" was the first in a series of letters directed at different groups in the United States. He followed it with "A Proclamation to the Officers and Soldiers of the Continental Army" dated October 20, 1780. These letters essentially echoed common Loyalist opinion.

== Contents ==
I should forfeit even in my own Opinion, the place I have so long held in yours, if I could be indifferent to your Approbation, and silent on the Motives which have induced me to join the King’s Arms.

A very few words, however, shall suffice upon a Subject so personal, for to the thousands who suffer under the tyranny of the Usurpers in the revolted Provinces, as well as to the great multitude who have long wished for its Subversion, this instance of my Conduct can want no Vindication, as to that class of Men who are Criminally protracting the War from Sinister Views, at the expense of the Public Interest, I prefer their Enmity to their applause. I am only, therefore, Concerned in this address to explain myself to such of my Countrymen as want Abilities or Opportunities to detect the Artifices by which they are duped.

Having fought by your side when the love of our Country animated our Arms, I shall expect from your Justice and Candor, what your deceivers, with more Art and less honesty, will find it inconsistent with their own Views to admit.

When I quitted Domestick happiness for the Perils of the Field, I conceived the rights of my Country in Danger, and that Duty and Honor called me to her Defence-a Redress of Grievances was my only Object and aim; however, I acquiesced in a step which I thought precipitate the Declaration of Independence; to Justify the measure many plausible reasons were urged, which could no longer exist, when Great Britain with the open arms of a Parent offered to embrace us as Children, and grant the wished for redress.

And now that her worst Enemies are in her own bosom, I should change my Principles, If I conspired with their Designs. Yourselves being Judges, was the war the less Just, because Fellow Subjects were considered as our Foes? You have felt the torture in which we raised our arms against a Brother-God Incline the Guilty protractors of these unnatural Dissentions, to resign their Ambition, and Cease from their Delusions, in Compassion to kindred blood.

I anticipate your question: was not the War a defensive one until the French Joined in the Combination? I answer, that I thought so. You will add, was it not afterwards necessary till the Separation of the British Empire was compleat? By no means; in Contending for the Welfare of my Country, I am free to declare my Opinion, that this End attained, all strife should have ceased.

I lamented therefore the Impolicy, tyranny, and Injustice, which with a Sovereign Contempt of the People of America, studiously neglected to take their Collective Sentiments of the British proposals of Peace, and to negotiate under a suspension of Arms, for an adjustment of differences, as a dangerous Sacrifice of the great Interest of this Country to the Partial Views of a Proud, Antient, and Crafty Foe. I had my suspicions of some imperfections in Our Councils, on Proposals prior to the Parliamentary Commission of 1778; but having then less to do in the Cabinet than the Field (I will not pronounce peremptorily as some may, and perhaps Justly, that Congress have veiled them from the Publick Eye), I continued to be guided in the negligent Confidence of a soldier. But the whole world saw, and all America confessed, the Overtures of the Second Commission exceeded our wishes and expectations. If there was any Suspicion of the National liberality, it arose from its excess.

Do any believe we were at that time really entangled by an Alliance with France? Unfortunate deception! and thus they have been duped by a virtuous Credulity, in the incautious moments of intemperate passion, to give up their fidelity to serve a Nation counting both the will and the power to protect us, and aiming at the Destruction both of the Mother Country and the Provinces. In the Plainess of Common Sense, for I pretend to no Casuistry, did the pretended Treaty with the Court of Versailles amount to more than an Overture to America? Certainly not, because no Authority had been given by the People to conclude it, nor to this very hour have they authorized its ratification-the Articles of Confederation remain still unsigned.

In the firm persuasion, therefore, that the private Judgment of any Individual Citizen of this Country is as free from all Conventional Restraints since, as before the Insidious offers of France, I preferred those from Great Britain, thinking it infinitely wiser and safer to cast my Confidence upon her Justice and Generosity, than to trust a Monarchy too feeble to establish your Independency, so Perilous to her distant Dominions; the Enemy of the Protestant Faith, and fraudulently avowing an affection for the liberties of mankind, while she holds her Native Sons in Vassalage and Chains.

I affect no disguise, and therefore Frankly declare that in these Principles, I had determined to retain my arms and Command for an opportunity to surrender them to Great Britain, and in concerting the Measures for a purpose, in my Opinion, as grateful as it would have been beneficial to my Country; I was only solicitous to accomplish an event of decisive Importance, and to prevent, as much as possible in the Execution of it, the Effusion of blood.

With the highest satisfaction I bear testimony to my old Fellow Soldiers and Citizens; that I find solid Ground to rely upon the Clemency of our Sovereign, and abundant Conviction that it is the generous Intention of Great Britain, not only to have the Rights and privileges of the Colonies unimpaired, together with their perpetual exemption from taxation, but to superadd such further benefits as may consist with the Common prosperity of the Empire. In short, I fought for much less than the Parent Country is as willing to grant to her Colonies, as they can be to receive or enjoy.

Some may think I continued in the struggle of those unhappy days too long, and others that I quitted it too soon. To the first I reply, that I did not see with their Eyes, nor perhaps had so favorable a situation to look from, and that to one Common Master I am willing to stand or fall. In behalf of the Candid among the latter, some of whom I believe serve blindly but honestly in the Ranks I have left, I pray God to give them all the lights requisite to their Own Safety before it is too late; and with respect to that kind of Censurers whose Enmity to me Originates in their hatred to the Principles, by which I am now led to devote my life to the Reunion of the British Empire, as the best and only means to dry up the streams of misery that have deluged this country, they may be assured that, Conscious of the Rectitude of my Intentions, I shall treat their Malice and Calumnies with Contempt and neglect.

NEW YORK, Oct. 7th, 1780.

== American reactions ==
Many New England newspapers published responses to Arnold's letter. The Connecticut Courant published a response by Noah Webster that answered Arnold with "patriotic ardor". The normally even-tempered Washington's reaction to Arnold's treason was very bitter; he saw Arnold as villainous, misguided, and completely evil.
