= W. D. Wetherell =

American writer

W.D. Wetherell
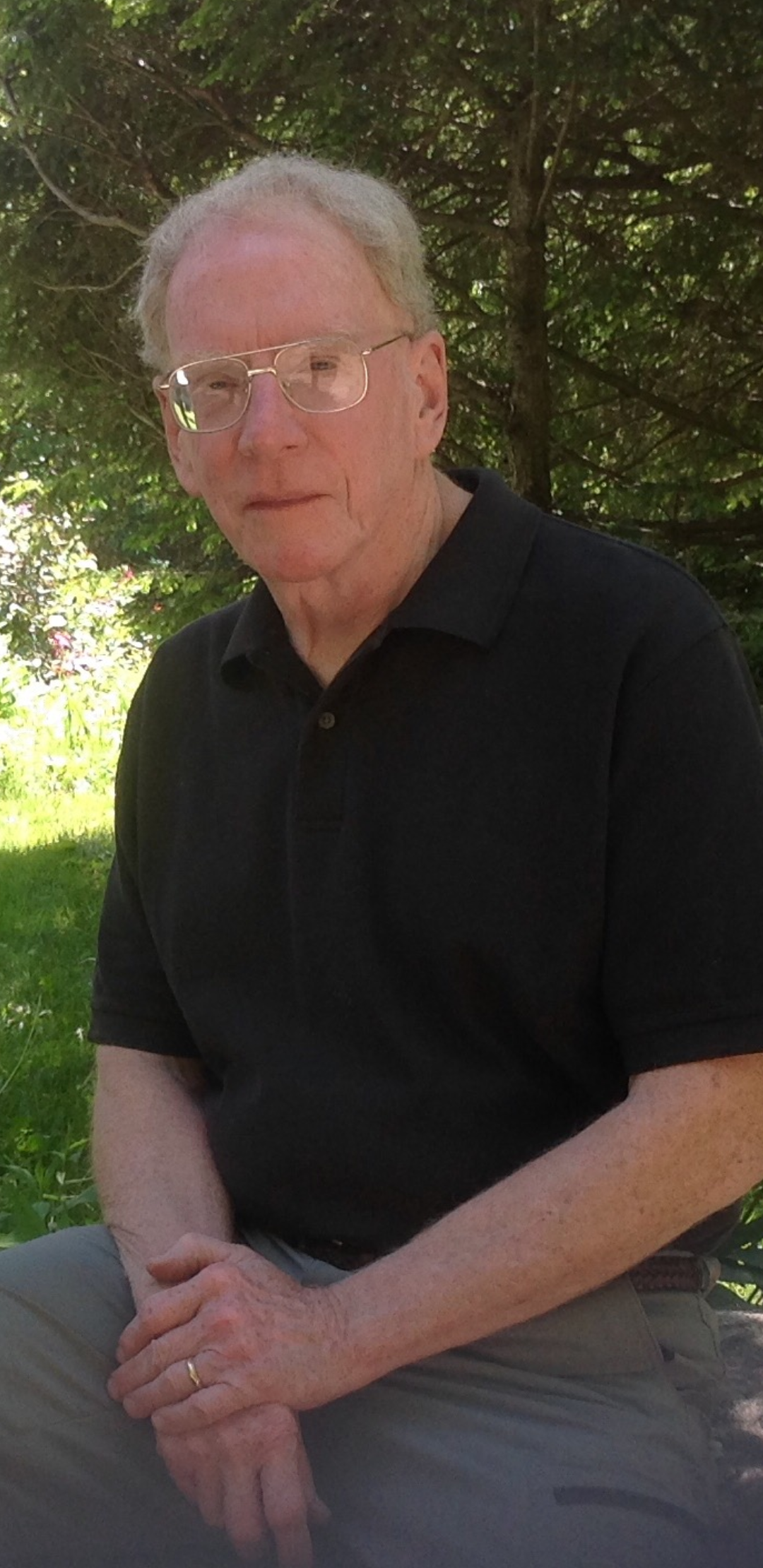
- Born: October 5, 1948 (age 78); Mineola, New York, U.S.
- Writing career
- Pen name: W.D. Wetherell
- Notable works: The Man Who Loved Levittown (1985), Chekhov's Sister (1990), A Century of November (2002), The Writing on the Wall (2012), A River Trilogy (2017)
- Website: wdwetherell.com

W.D. Wetherell (born October 5, 1948) is an American writer of over twenty-five books, novels, short story collections, memoirs, essay collections, and books on travel and history. He was born in Mineola, New York, and lives in Lyme, New Hampshire.

His essays, short stories, and articles have appeared in a wide variety of publications, including The Atlantic, The Washington Post, The Chicago Tribune, Virginia Quarterly Review, Georgia Review, Appalachia, The Boston Globe, Reader's Digest, Fly-Fisherman, and many more. For eighteen years his essays on travel appeared frequently in The New York Times. In spring 2024, he began a monthly Substack column, Wetherell on Writing, with thoughts on craft, books, and the writing life.

His autobiographical short story, "The Bass, the River, and Sheila Mant," telling the story of a fourteen-year-old boy who must choose between the girl of his dreams and the fish of his dreams, has been anthologized over twenty times, and appears in many textbooks for middle school, high school, and college English.

Wetherell's awards include two NEA Creative Writing Fellowships, three O'Henry Awards for short stories, the Drue Heinz Literature Prize, the National Magazine Award, the Arnold Gingrich Fly-Fishing Heritage Award, The "Best Short Story" of 1993 award from the Catholic Press Association, the Michigan Literary Fiction Award, the National Magazine Award, a National Book Award nomination, and a New York Times Notable Book of the Year Award in 1990. He was visiting scholar at the Rockefeller Foundation's Bellagio Center in Italy in 1993. In 1998, he received the Strauss Living Award from the American Academy of Arts and Letters allowing him to devote himself exclusively to writing for the next five years. In 1985, Wetherell was invited to read from his work at the Library of Congress.

Wetherell's recent books include Summer of the Bass and Where Wars Go to Die: the Forgotten Literature of World War One, and Small Water, a celebration of a small New England pond. Wetherell marked his 50th anniversary as a writer with two new books, the story collection Where We Live, and the audio novel, Macken in Love.

== Bibliography ==
=== Novels ===
- Souvenirs (1981)
- Chekhov's Sister (1990)
- La Soeur de Tchekhov (1992)
- The Wisest Man in America (1995)
- Morning (2002)
- A Century of November (2002)
- Un Siècle de Novembre (2006)
- The Writing on the Wall (2012)
- Macken in Love (2018)

=== Short Story Collections ===
- The Man Who Loved Levittown (1985)
- Hyannis Boat and Other Stories (1989)
- Wherever That Great Heart May Be (1996)
- Hills Like White Hills (2009)
- Where We Live (2018)

=== Essay Collections ===
- Vermont River (1984)
- Upland Stream (1998)
- One River More (1998)
- On Admiration (2010)
- Summer of the Bass (2015)
- A River Trilogy (2018)

=== Memoirs ===
- North of Now (2000)
- Yellowstone Autumn (2009)
- Soccer Dad (2008)

=== Travel and Nature ===
- The Smithsonian Guides to Natural America; Northern New England (1995)
- Small Mountains (2000)
- Small Water (2022)

=== History / Literature ===
- This American River (2002)
- Where Wars Go To Die (2016)
