= Willard Sterne Randall =

American historian and author (born 1942)

- Born: March 13, 1942 (age 84); Philadelphia, Pennsylvania, U.S.
- Occupations: Author, historian
- Spouse: Nancy Nahra
- Children: 4
- Website: www.willardrandall.net

Willard Sterne Randall (born March 13, 1942) is an American historian and author who specializes in biographies related to the American colonial period and the American Revolution. He teaches American history at Champlain College in Burlington, Vermont.

== Publications ==
External videos
- Booknotes interview with Randall on Thomas Jefferson: A Life, December 26, 1993, C-SPAN
- Presentation by Randall on George Washington: A Life, December 10, 1998, C-SPAN
- Presentation by Randall on Alexander Hamilton: A Life, January 18, 2003, C-SPAN
- Presentation by Randall on Ethan Allen: His Life and Times, August 18, 2011, C-SPAN
- Presentation by Randall on Unshackling America, July 15, 2017, C-SPAN
- Presentation by Randall on The Founders' Fortunes, February 10, 2022, C-SPAN

- A Little Revenge: Benjamin Franklin & His Son. Little Brown and Company. 1984. ISBN 978-0-316-73365-6.
- Benedict Arnold: Patriot and Traitor. William Morrow. 1990. ISBN 978-0-7607-1272-6.
- Thomas Jefferson: A Life. Holt. 1993. ISBN 0-8050-1577-9.
- American Lives, Volumes I and II. Longman. 1996. ISBN 978-0-673-46986-1.
- George Washington: A Life. Henry Holt & Co. 1997. ISBN 0-8050-2779-3.
- Forgotten Americans: Footnote Figures Who Changed American History. Da Capo Press. 1999. ISBN 978-0-7382-0150-4.
- Alexander Hamilton: A Life. HarperCollins. 2003. ISBN 0-06-019549-5.
- Ethan Allen: His Life and Times. W. W. Norton & Company. 2011. ISBN 978-0-393-07665-3.
- Unshackling America: How the War of 1812 Truly Ended the American Revolution. St. Martin's Press. 2017. ISBN 978-1-25015918-2.
- The Founders' Fortunes: How Money Shaped the Birth of America. Dutton. 2022. ISBN 978-1-52474592-9.
- John Hancock: First to Sign, First to Invest in America's Independence. Dutton. 2025. ISBN 978-0-59347214-9.
