= Military career of Benedict Arnold, 1775–1776 =

Early Revolutionary War career of Benedict Arnold

Benedict Arnold V
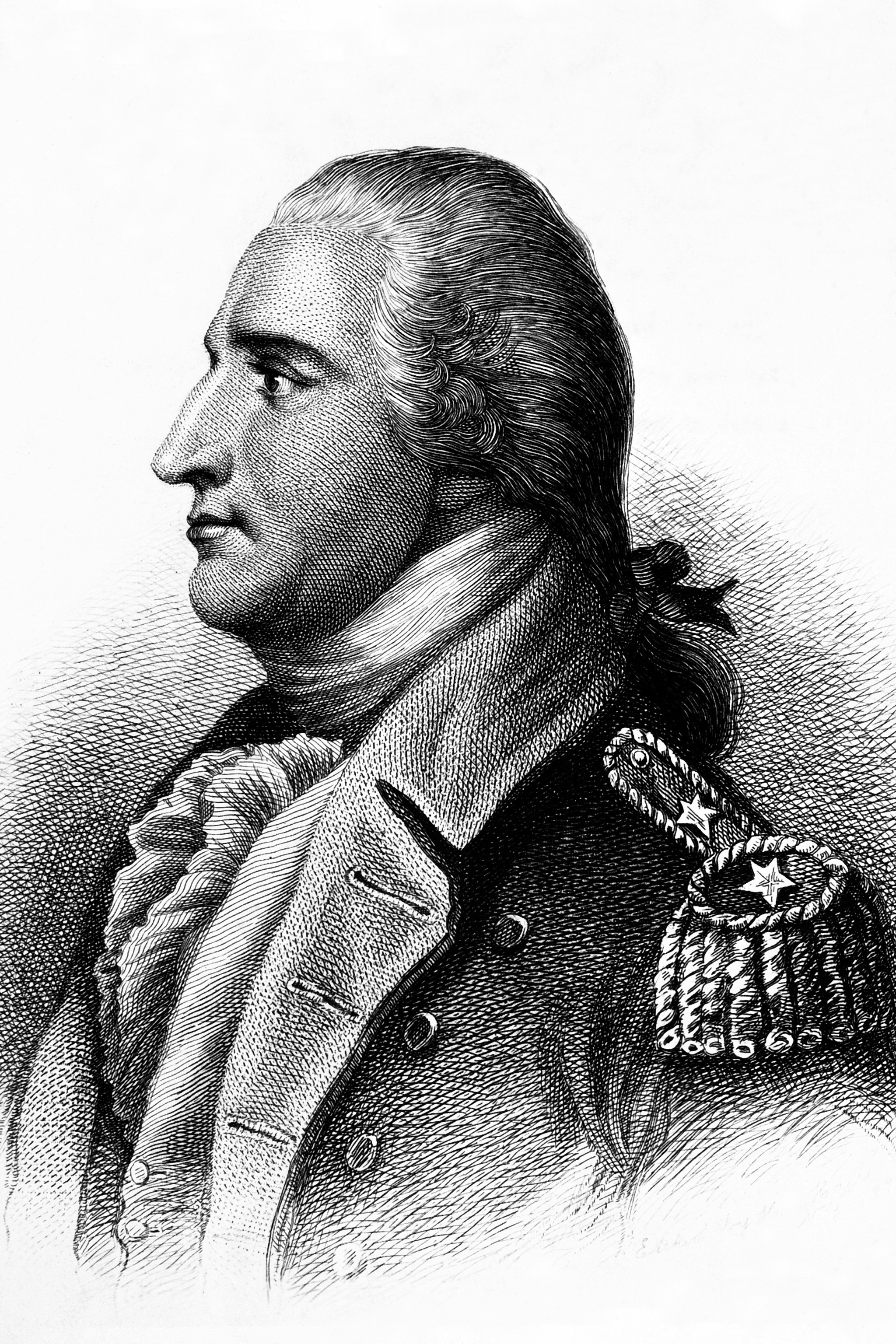
- Benedict Arnold; Copy of engraving by H.B. Hall after John Trumbull
- Born: January 14, 1741; Norwich, Connecticut
- Died: June 14, 1801 (aged 60); London, England
- Burial place: London
- Military career
- Branch: British colonial militia Continental Army; British Army
- Service years: British colonial militia: 1757, 1775; Continental Army: 1775–1780; British Army: 1780–1781
- Commands: Fort Ticonderoga (June 1775); Quebec City (siege, January–April 1776); Montreal (April–June 1776); Lake Champlain fleet (August–October 1776)
- Conflicts: American Revolutionary War, 1775–1776; Invasion of Canada; Capture of Fort Ticonderoga; Arnold's expedition to Quebec; Battle of Quebec; Battle of The Cedars; Battle of Valcour Island
- Awards: promotion to brigadier general

The military career of Benedict Arnold in 1775 and 1776 covers many of the military actions that occurred in the northernmost Thirteen Colonies early in the American Revolutionary War. Arnold began the war as a captain in Connecticut's militia, a position to which he was elected in March 1775. Following the outbreak of hostilities at Lexington and Concord the following month, his company marched northeast to assist in the siege of Boston that followed. Arnold proposed to the Massachusetts Committee of Safety an action to seize Fort Ticonderoga in New York, which he knew was poorly defended. They issued a colonel's commission to him on May 3, 1775, and he immediately rode off to the west, where he arrived at Castleton in the disputed New Hampshire Grants (present-day Vermont) in time to participate with Ethan Allen and his men in the capture of Fort Ticonderoga. He followed up that action with a bold raid on Fort Saint-Jean on the Richelieu River north of Lake Champlain. He then resigned his Massachusetts commission after a command dispute with the head of a detachment of Connecticut militia troops that arrived in June to reinforce Ticonderoga.

When the Second Continental Congress authorized an invasion of Quebec, in part on the urging of Arnold, he was passed over for leading the expedition. Arnold then went to Cambridge, Massachusetts, and suggested to George Washington a second expedition to attack Quebec City via a wilderness route through present-day Maine. This expedition, for which Arnold received a colonel's commission in the Continental Army, left Cambridge in September 1775 with 1,100 men. After a difficult passage in which 300 men turned back and another 200 died en route, Arnold arrived before Quebec City in November. Joined by Brigadier General Richard Montgomery's small army, he participated in the December 31 assault on Quebec City in which Montgomery was killed and he was wounded. Arnold, who was promoted to brigadier general for his role in reaching Quebec, maintained an ineffectual siege of the city until he was replaced by Major General David Wooster in April 1776.

Arnold then traveled to Montreal, where he served as military commander of the city until forced to retreat by an advancing British army that had arrived at Quebec in May. He presided over the rear of the Continental Army's retreat from Saint-Jean, where he was reported to be the last person to leave before the British arrived. He then directed the construction of a fleet to defend Lake Champlain, which was defeated in the October 1776 Battle of Valcour Island. His actions at Saint-Jean and Valcour Island played a notable role in delaying the British advance against Ticonderoga until 1777.

During these actions, Arnold made a number of friends and a larger number of enemies within the army power structure and in Congress. The actions of some of these political enemies resulted in courts martial and other investigations that contributed to his eventual decision to join the British side of the conflict in 1780.

== Background ==
Benedict Arnold was born in 1741 into a well-to-do family in the port city of Norwich in the British colony of Connecticut. He was interested in military affairs from an early age, serving briefly (without seeing action) in the colonial militia during the French and Indian War in 1757. He embarked on a career as a businessman, first opening a shop in New Haven, and then engaging in overseas trade. He owned and operated ships, sailing to the West Indies, Quebec and Europe. When the British Parliament began to impose taxes on its colonies, Arnold's businesses began to be affected by them and the activities of colonists opposed to the taxes, a cause he eventually joined. In 1767 he married Margaret Mansfield, with whom he had three children, one of whom died in infancy.

== Early Revolutionary War ==
In March 1775, a group of 65 New Haven residents formed the Governor's Second Company of Connecticut Guards. Arnold was chosen as their captain, and he organized training and exercises in preparation for war. On April 21, 1775, news reached New Haven of the opening battles of the revolution at Lexington and Concord. Arnold's company formed up to march to Boston the next day, but the town council would not release any gunpowder to them. In a confrontation between Arnold and David Wooster that is reenacted in New Haven every Powder House Day, Arnold successfully argued with the older man that he would take the powder one way or another. The magazine was opened, Arnold's company was armed, and they marched off to Boston.

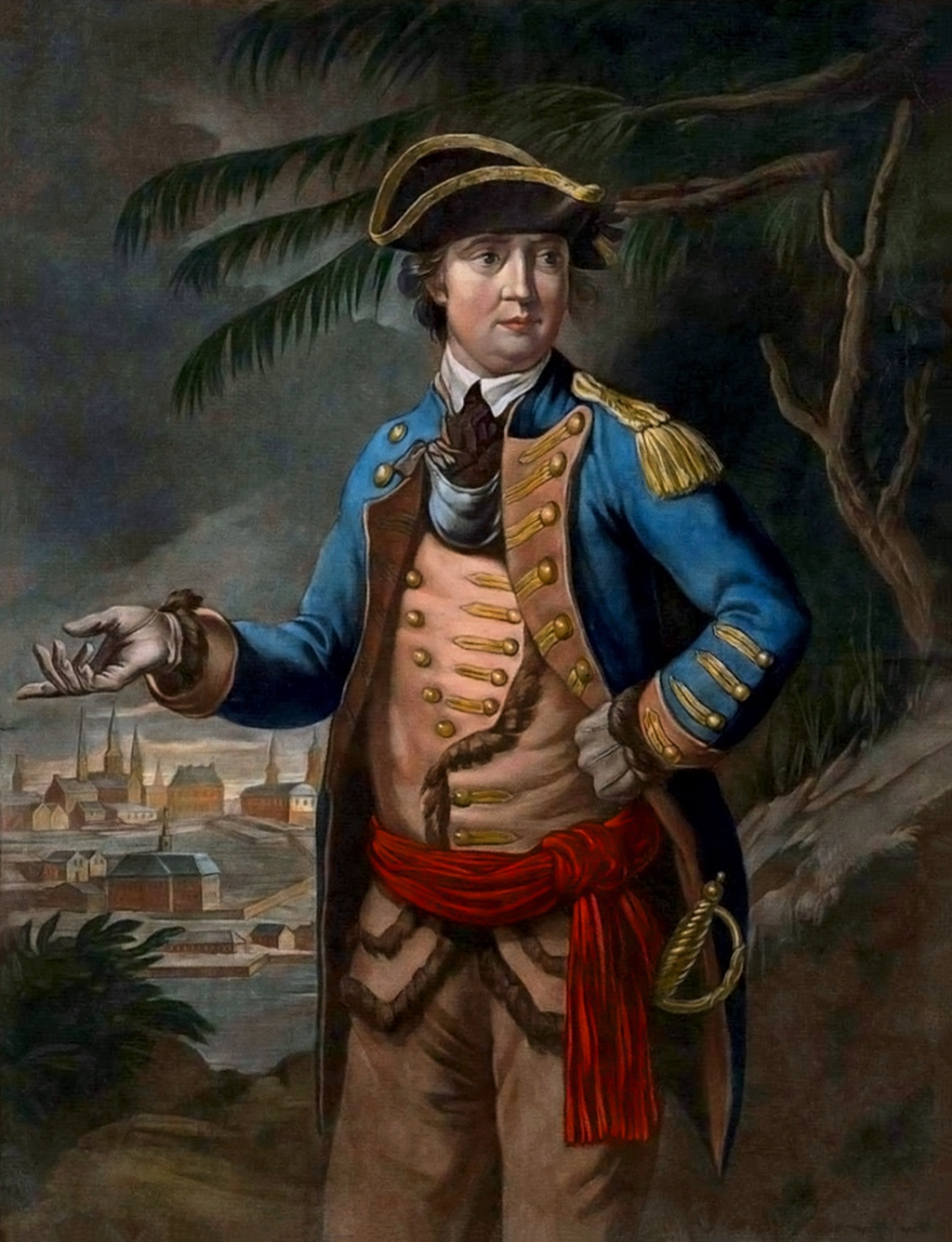
Colonel Benedict Arnold in 1776

During the march, Arnold encountered Connecticut legislator and militia Colonel Samuel Holden Parsons. They discussed the shortage of cannons in the revolutionary forces and, knowing of the large number of cannons at Fort Ticonderoga on Lake Champlain, agreed that an expedition should be sent to capture the fort. Parsons continued on to Hartford, where he raised funds to establish a force under the command of Captain Edward Mott. Mott was instructed to link up with Ethan Allen and the Green Mountain Boys at Bennington in the disputed New Hampshire Grants territory (now Vermont). Meanwhile, Arnold and his Connecticut militia continued on to Cambridge, where Arnold convinced the Massachusetts Committee of Safety to fund an expedition to take the fort. On May 3, the committee appointed him a colonel in the Massachusetts militia and dispatched him, and several captains under his command, to raise an army in Massachusetts. As his captains recruited troops Arnold rode west. When he reached Williamstown he learned of the activities of Mott and Allen. Turning north, he reached Castleton on May 9, where Allen's forces were already gathering. Arnold attempted to gain control over the expedition by asserting the legitimacy of his commission, but Allen's Green Mountain Boys, by far the largest part of the force, refused to act under the command of anyone other than Allen. In a compromise negotiated privately between Allen and Arnold, the two appeared to jointly lead the expedition. (Note: There are no contemporary accounts documenting the agreement between Allen and Arnold. Pell (1929), p. 81 claims there is no documentary evidence. Boatner (1974) (pp. 1101–1102) notes that while Ward believes Arnold merely had the right to march next to Allen, Allen French argues otherwise in The Taking of Ticonderoga in 1775. Bellesiles (1995), p. 117 claims that Allen offered Arnold the right to march at the head of the column to placate Arnold.)

On May 10, 1775, Fort Ticonderoga was assaulted in a dawn attack and taken without a battle, the colonial forces having surprised the outnumbered British garrison. They also captured nearby Fort Crown Point and Fort George, which were occupied by even smaller garrisons. Following these captures, Allen's men broke into the liquor stored at the fort, and became somewhat unruly. Arnold, who wanted to inventory the fort's military assets for possible transport to Boston, was incensed, but powerless to stop them. With the arrival of men his captains had recruited, and of a schooner they had captured, Arnold then executed a daring raid on Fort Saint-Jean, not far from Montreal. He took more prisoners, and also captured the largest military vessel on Lake Champlain, giving the Americans complete military control of the lake.

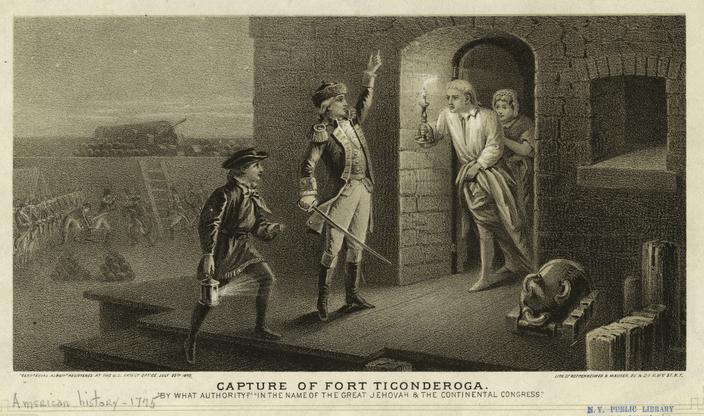
Engraving depicting Ethan Allen demanding the surrender of Fort Ticonderoga

After returning to Ticonderoga, Arnold began to exert more authority over the place as Allen's men drifted away. However, a Connecticut force of 1,000 men under Colonel Benjamin Hinman arrived in June with orders placing him in command with Arnold as his subordinate. This act angered Arnold, who felt his efforts on behalf of the revolution were not being recognized; he resigned his commission and headed for his home in Connecticut. Arnold's angry response to the loss of command led some members of Congress to dislike him in spite of his military contributions. Congressional opinion of Arnold was also negatively affected by reports circulated by two men that Arnold came to consider enemies. John Brown and James Easton were two of Allen's lieutenants who had traveled to Massachusetts and Philadelphia to report on the action. While their characterizations of Arnold's behavior were accurate, he apparently came to believe that they had probably slandered him, and later interactions with both men were marked by conflict. In an encounter between Arnold and Easton in June, Easton slighted Arnold's authority, to which Arnold responded by challenging the other man to a duel. Easton demurred, and Arnold, in his account of the affair, "took the Liberty of Breaking his head". After Arnold resigned his Massachusetts commission, the state's Committee of Safety appointed Easton to take over the Massachusetts troops at Ticonderoga.

When he reached Albany, Arnold received a letter informing him that his wife had died. He also met with Major General Philip Schuyler, newly in command of the Continental Army's Northern Department, with whom he established a cordial relationship. Arnold returned to New Haven, where he visited his children (now in the care of his sister Hannah) and took care of business dealings. While in New Haven he suffered his first attacks of gout, which plagued him for the rest of his life.

== Quebec expedition ==
While at Ticonderoga, both Arnold and Allen lobbied Congress with the idea of taking Quebec from the British, as it was lightly defended. General Schuyler was eventually assigned the task of developing a plan to invade Quebec via Lake Champlain in July. The objective was to deprive the British of an important base from which they could attack upper New York. Schuyler intended to lead this force, but due to illness he turned command over to Brigadier General Richard Montgomery early in the expedition, which left in late August.

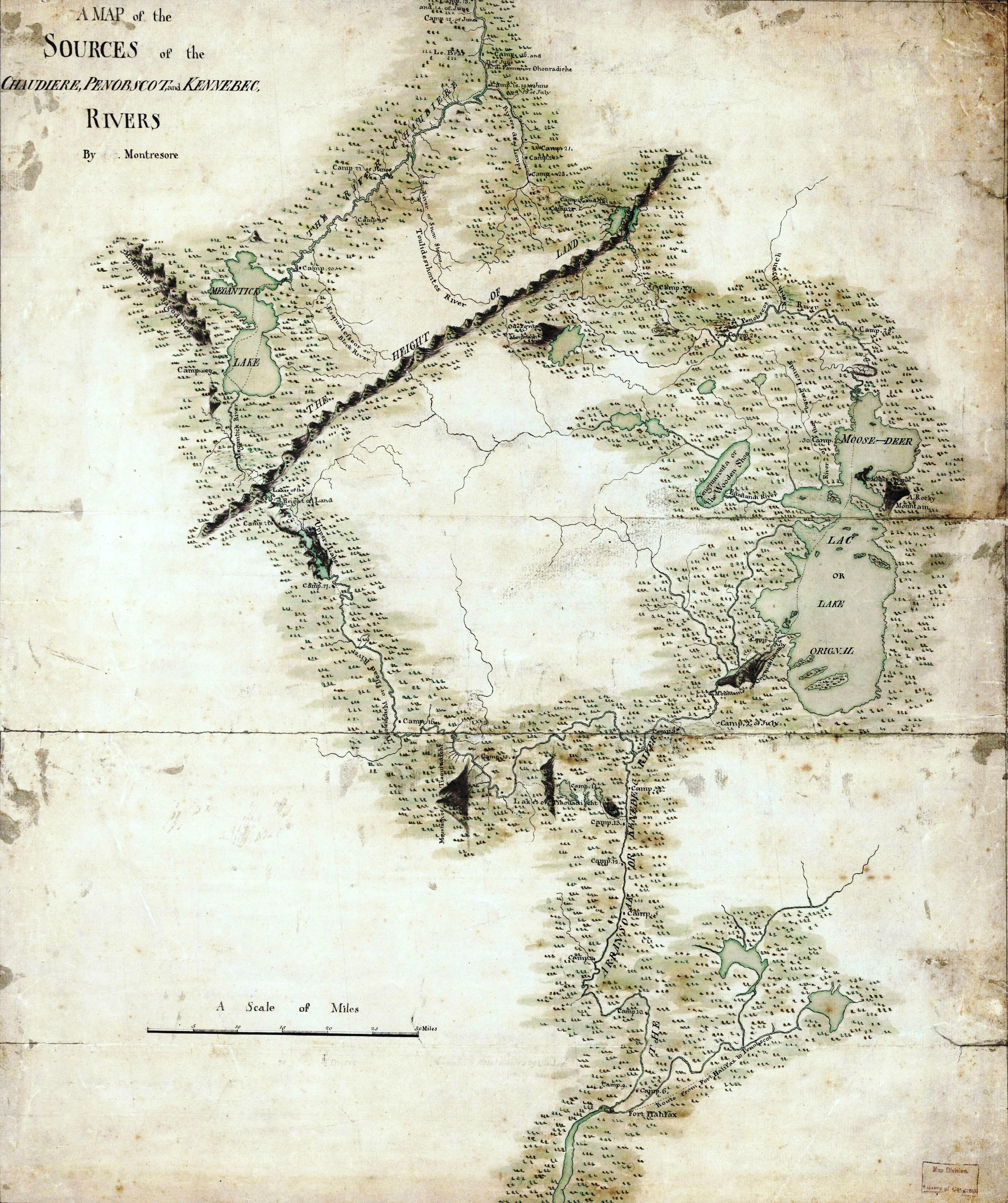
An inaccurate 1760 map by John Montresor, used by Arnold as a guide on his expedition

Arnold, deprived of the opportunity to lead that expedition, went to Cambridge and proposed to George Washington that a second force, in concert with Schuyler's, attack by traveling through the wilderness of what is now Maine to Quebec City. Washington and Schuyler approved the idea, and Washington gave Arnold a colonel's commission in the Continental Army and leadership of the expedition. Arnold used as a guide for the expedition a map and journal he had acquired that were made by John Montresor, a British engineer who mapped the route in 1761. The journal was vague in some details, and, unknown to Arnold, the map contained deliberate omissions to reduce its value to military opponents.

The force of 1,100 recruits embarked from Newburyport, Massachusetts on September 19, 1775, arriving at Gardinerston, Maine, where Arnold had made prior arrangements with Major Reuben Colburn to construct 200 shallow-draft boats known as bateaux, on September 22. These were to be used to transport the troops up the Kennebec and Dead rivers, then down the Chaudière River to Quebec City. The expedition had numerous difficulties that slowed its progress, including several lengthy and difficult portages, bad weather, inaccurate maps, and troops inexperienced in handling the boats. As a result, the expedition took much longer than expected, 500 men either died or turned back, and the remnants were near starvation when they reached the Saint Lawrence River in November.

The British had been alerted to Arnold's approach and had destroyed all of the boats on the river's southern banks. Although two warships, the frigate Lizard (26 guns) and the sloop-of-war Hunter (16 guns), kept up a constant patrol to prevent a river crossing, Arnold was able to procure sufficient watercraft for his men, and crossed to the Quebec City side on November 11. He then realized his force was not strong enough to capture the city, so he retreated several miles and waited for Montgomery.

In late August, Montgomery sailed north from Fort Ticonderoga with about 1,200 men. After successfully besieging Fort Saint-Jean, he captured Montreal on November 13. The two men joined forces in early December, and with their combined force of about 1,200 soldiers, they attacked Quebec on December 31, 1775. The colonial forces suffered a disastrous defeat at the hands of General Guy Carleton, governor of Quebec and commander of the British forces. Montgomery was killed leading an assault along with all but one of his officers; his men never got close to the walls. Arnold's force made a descent into the lower town. Early in the battle, Arnold was wounded in the leg, but stayed on the battlefield encouraging his troops on. Daniel Morgan's rifle company, the most successful of the American troops, fought inside the city until Morgan was cornered and forced to surrender. Many others were killed or wounded, and hundreds were taken prisoner.

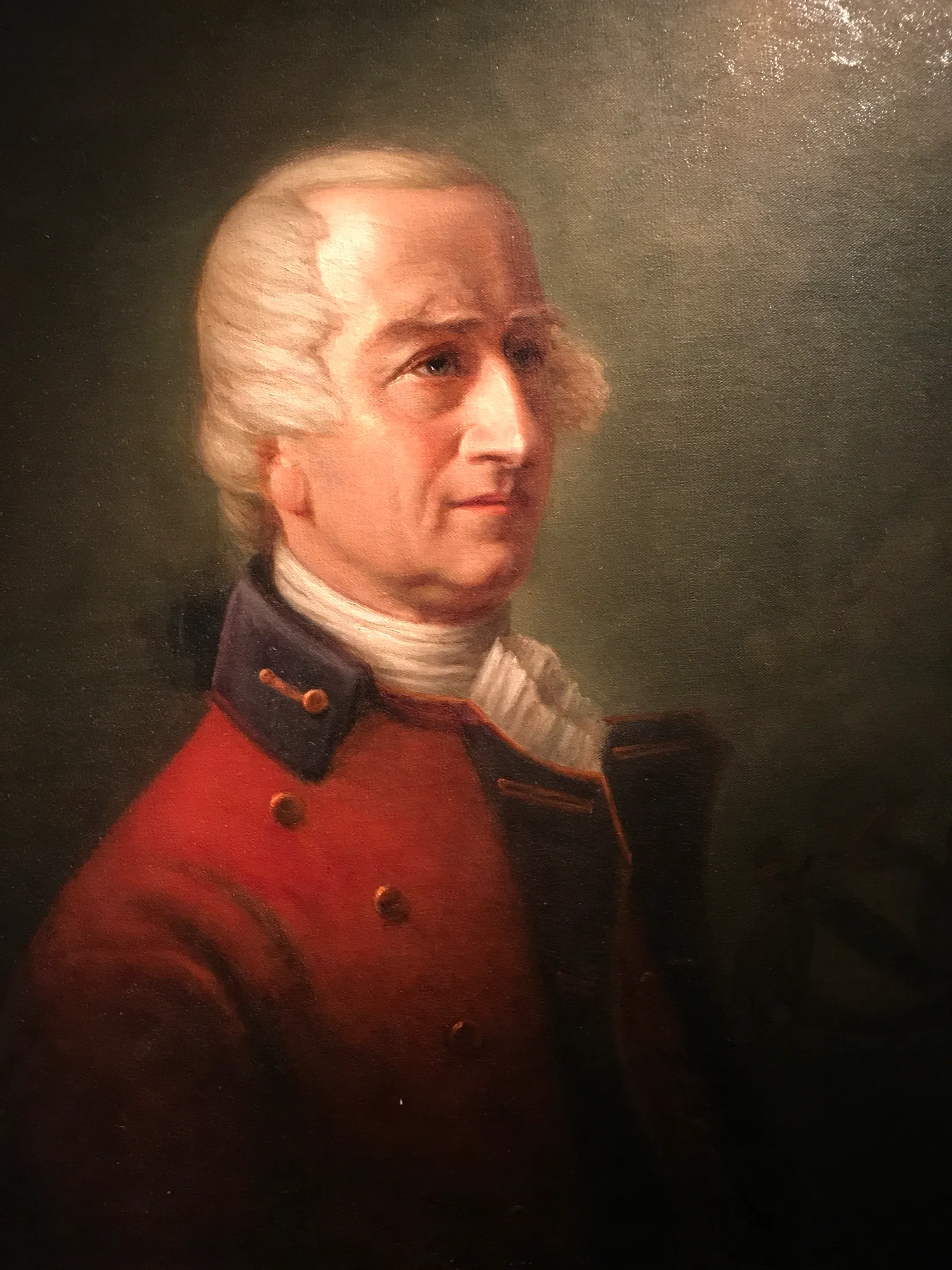
General Guy Carleton, who opposed Arnold and Montgomery at Quebec, and Arnold at Valcour Island

The remnants of the army, reduced by the battle and by expiring enlistments to some 600 men, now came under Arnold's command. Instead of retreating, Arnold maintained a minimally effective siege around the city. In this time Arnold learned that he had been promoted to brigadier general in January for his success in reaching Quebec City. He also had a run-in with John Brown, who was now a major and had come north with Montgomery. Montgomery had apparently promised Brown a promotion, which he then applied to Arnold to receive. Arnold, apparently still smarting over the perceived slights at Ticonderoga, denied the promotion, which Brown promptly appealed directly to Congress. Arnold's response to this threat to his authority was to accuse Brown, and also Easton, who had been present when Montgomery took Montreal but had returned south, of improperly plundering the bags of British officers. When Brown insisted on a court martial to clear his name, Arnold again refused, attempting to further smear the two men through the use of intermediaries. (Brown never received a formal hearing on Arnold's charges.)

Arnold maintained the siege until the spring of 1776, when reinforcements under Brigadier General David Wooster arrived. Arnold traveled to Montreal to take up military command of that city.

== Retreat from Quebec ==
In May 1776, while a delegation of the Continental Congress was visiting Montreal, a large British fleet began arriving in Quebec, precipitating the retreat of the Continental Army from Quebec City. Arnold's administration of Montreal became complicated by a British-Indian force's attack on an American fort at The Cedars, upriver from Montreal, in May that began to unfold while he was attending a war council with the retreating army's command and the Congressional delegation at Sorel. He returned to Montreal to organize a response, and, with the assistance of timely reinforcements, reached an agreement for a prisoner exchange with the British, who were holding the garrison from the fort. In a war council discussing how to respond to the incident, Arnold had a heated exchange with Moses Hazen, the commander of the 2nd Canadian Regiment, that was the beginning of a series of disputes between them that eventually resulted in courts martial of both men.

Arnold then began preparing to evacuate the American garrison from Montreal. Pursuant to instructions from the Congressmen he began seizing supplies from local merchants, issuing receipts for the goods that the merchants could use in compensation claims later. These goods, which were marked to identify the supplying merchant, were shipped to Fort Chambly in early June. Hazen, who owned property in the area and was in command at Chambly, refused to store the goods, believing them to be goods seized improperly from merchants he knew.

Arnold's anger at Hazen's act needed to be held back; the British advance up the St. Lawrence almost caught him by surprise. He was alerted that British ships were approaching the city by a messenger he sent toward Sorel for news. Upon departure from the city, he ordered fires to be set in an attempt to burn the city before the British arrived, and then went to Saint-Jean, where he joined the rear of the retreating army. Arnold directed his forces to destroy by burning or sinking any ships the British could use on Lake Champlain, and set fire to the fort and nearby works. Arnold is reported to have waited until the vanguard of the British army came into musket range before shooting his own horse dead and pushing off from Saint-Jean and departing up the Richelieu to Champlain.

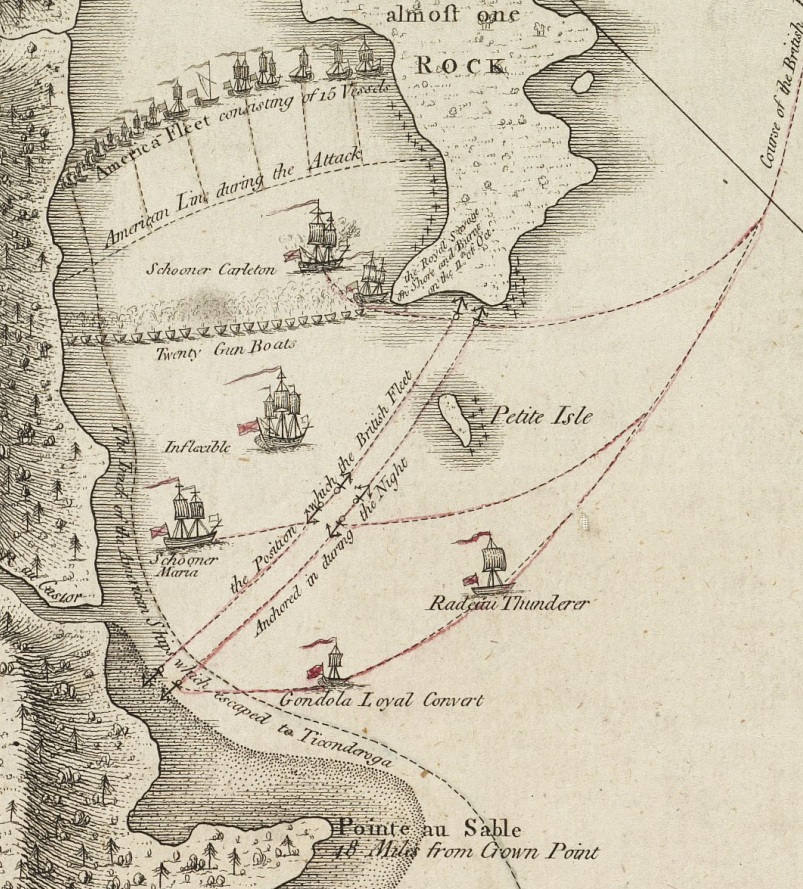
Detail of a 1776 map depicting ship positions in the Battle of Valcour Island

Arnold then spent the summer of 1776 coordinating the construction of a flotilla of small warships and gunboats at Skenesborough, to delay the British further by denying them free access to the lake. The British responded by building a much larger lake flotilla at Saint-Jean, which they launched in early October. The British destroyed Arnold's flotilla at the Battle of Valcour Island in mid-October, and advanced as far as Crown Point. However, winter was setting in, so General Carleton called off the advance.

During the fleet's construction, Arnold ordered the arrest and trial of Hazen for dereliction of his duty with respect to the incident at Chambly. Hazen, a politically well-connected figure (his commission to lead the 2nd Canadian came after appearing before Congress following the Battle of Quebec), turned the proceeding on its head, countercharging that Arnold had stolen the goods in question, and that the officer responsible for transporting them, a Major Scott, had damaged them in transit. Major Scott's testimony was questioned and eventually rejected by the court martial, which acquitted Hazen and ordered Arnold's arrest. General Horatio Gates, then in command at Ticonderoga, dissolved the arrest warrant, citing the desperate need for Arnold's services against the expected British attack. Arnold's silence in response to Hazen's accusation probably confirmed and deepened the opinions people already held of him; those favorably disposed to him perceived it as a dignified non-response to a ridiculous accusation, while those who disliked him saw it as the reaction of a man whose hand had been caught in the till. Historians continue to debate whether Arnold was actually engaged in anything illegal. In the aftermath of these incidents, Congressman Samuel Chase warned Arnold that "your best friends are not your countrymen".

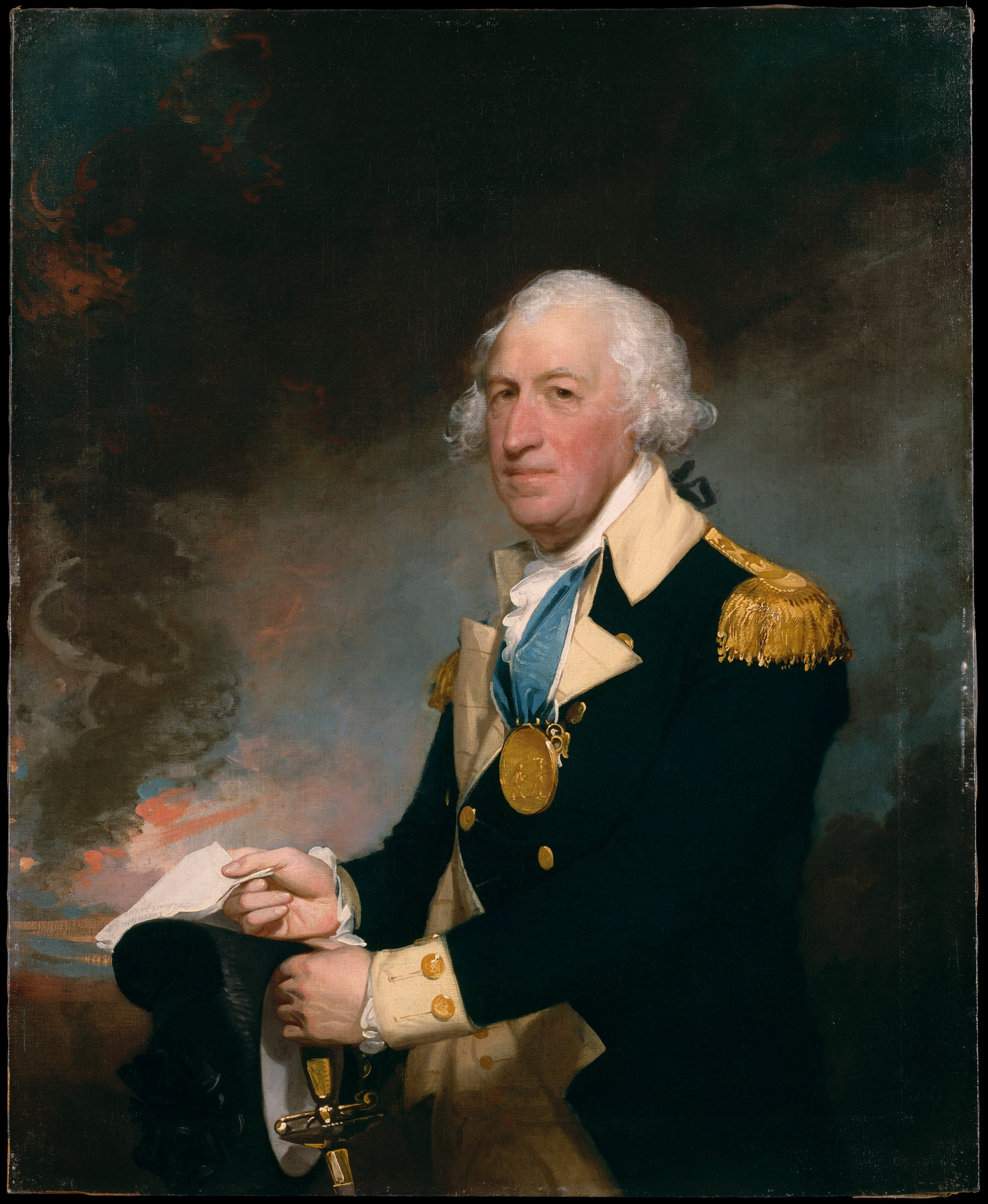
Portrait of Horatio Gates by Gilbert Stuart, 1794

Much of the army at Ticonderoga was ordered to march south in November, to reinforce Washington's army in the defense of New Jersey. In Albany, Arnold was again made to face formal charges. Brown and Hazen had each drawn up charges relating to earlier actions. Hazen charged defamation of character over the accusations Arnold had earlier levelled against him, and Brown accused him of a variety of minor charges, but also two peculiar ones: first, that Arnold had deliberately spread smallpox throughout the army in Quebec, and second, that Arnold had, during the raid on Saint-Jean, made "a treasonable attempt to make his escape ... to the enemy." General Gates refused a hearing of Brown's charges, and a court martial, although it determined that Arnold's accusation against Hazen constituted "an aspersion of Colonel Hazen's character", imposed no punishment. In the winter of 1776–77, Brown published a handbill that claimed of Arnold, "Money is this man's God, and to get enough of it he would sacrifice his country".

== Later military career ==
Washington assigned Arnold to the army's Eastern Department in December 1776 to assist in the defense of Rhode Island, where the British had occupied Newport. In February 1777, Arnold was passed over for promotion to major general by Congress, prompting him to consider resigning. He was visiting his family in New Haven when word arrived of a British action against an army supply depot in Danbury. Arnold and General Wooster helped to marshal militia response to this action, which culminated in the Battle of Ridgefield, where Wooster was killed and Arnold was again wounded in the leg. Arnold distinguished himself by continuing to regroup the militia companies and harrying the British forces all the way to the coast. He received promotion to major general for this action, although his seniority over the earlier appointments would not be restored until after his valiant leadership in the decisive battles of Saratoga in fall 1777.

While recovering from wounds incurred at Saratoga, Arnold was given military command of Philadelphia following the British withdrawal from that city. There he became embroiled in political and legal disputes that apparently convinced him to change sides in 1779. Negotiating with British Major John André for more than one year, his plot to surrender West Point failed in 1780 with André's capture and eventual hanging. His British military service began with an expedition to raid American supply depots in Virginia in 1781, during which the only major action was the Battle of Blandford. He was then sent on a raid against New London, Connecticut in early September in a fruitless attempt to divert Washington's march to face Cornwallis in Virginia. He sailed for London at the end of 1781, on a ship that also carried Lord Cornwallis, who had been released on parole after his surrender at Yorktown. Despite repeated attempts to gain command positions in the British Army or with the British East India Company, he was given no more military commands. He resumed business activities, engaging in trade while based at first in Saint John, New Brunswick and then London. On June 14, 1801 Benedict Arnold slipped into a coma and died.

== Notes ==
Citations
