= Military career of Benedict Arnold =

Military career of Benedict Arnold may refer to:

- Military career of Benedict Arnold, 1775–1776
- Military career of Benedict Arnold, 1777–1779
- Military career of Benedict Arnold, 1781
