= James Agnew (British Army officer) =

British soldier (1917–1777)

Brigadier-General James Agnew
- Born: 1719; England
- Died: 4 October 1777 (aged 57–58); Germantown, Pennsylvania
- Burial place: De Benneville Family Burial Grounds Philadelphia, Pennsylvania
- Military career
- Allegiance: Kingdom of Great Britain
- Branch: British Army
- Rank: Brigadier-General
- Conflicts: American Revolutionary War; Battle of Long Island; Battle of Ridgefield; Battle of the Brandywine; Battle of Germantown †

Brigadier-General James Tanner Agnew, of Howlish Hall, Co Durham (1719 – 4 October 1777) was a British Army officer reportedly killed by a sniper in the Battle of Germantown during the American Revolutionary War.

== Personal life ==
James Tanner Agnew was born in 1719 in England to Major James Agnew, 7th Dragoons (fourth son of Sir James Agnew of Lochnaw 4th Baronet), and Margaret Wilkinson. On 27 September 1747, he married Elizabeth Sanderson in County Durham, England. His son, Robert, was born c. 1749.

== Military service ==
Agnew came to Boston in the latter part of 1775, holding the rank of lieutenant-colonel. By 1777, he had been appointed a local brigadier general and commanded a brigade.

General Agnew was engaged at the Battle of Long Island in 1776. In 1777, Agnew accompanied British forces under the command of General William Tryon and General William Erskine on an inland raid against Patriot supply depot in Danbury, Connecticut. After successfully destroying Patriot supplies, the British forces engaged and defeated Continental Army Generals David Wooster, Benedict Arnold, and Gold S. Silliman and Patriot militiamen in the Battle of Ridgefield. Lastly, Agnew was at the Battle of the Brandywine, where he was wounded.

While leading his 4th brigade in support of Lord Cornwallis at the Battle of Germantown, General Agnew was shot by a sniper and the damage severed his spine and left him paralyzed. The sniper who shot General Agnew is rumored to be Hans Philip Boyer but there aren't many sources to solidify this claim. His soldiers brought him back to his quarters in John Wister's Big House (now called Grumblethorpe) on Germantown Avenue. Agnew bled out in the northwest room on the ground floor.

He is buried at De Benneville Family Burial Grounds, on the 6000 block of North Broad Street, Philadelphia, Pennsylvania
