= Charles Whiting Wooster =

Chilean Navy Admiral (1780–1840)

Charles Wooster
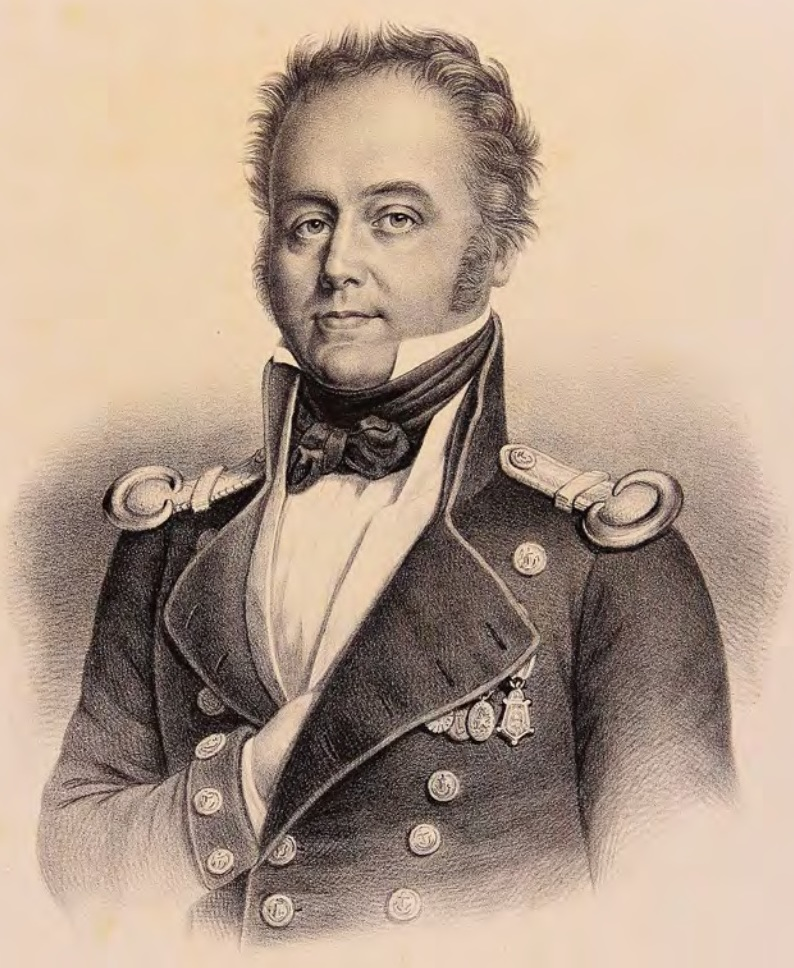
- Born: c. 1780; New Haven, Connecticut, United States
- Died: c. 1848 (aged c. 68)
- Allegiance: United States; Chile
- Branch: United States Navy; Chilean Navy
- Rank: Rear Admiral
- Conflicts: War of 1812; Chilean War of Independence

Charles William Whiting Wooster (c. 1780 - c. 1848) was a Commander-in-Chief of the Chilean Navy. He was the grandson of General David Wooster. Wooster went to sea at an early age. During the War of 1812, he served on board the U.S. privateer Saratoga. Having earned substantial prize money and gained significant influence, he was named captain of the Port of New York after the war. With the death of his young wife, he chose to join the fight for independence in Chile.
