= Battle of Ridgefield =

Battle of the American Revolutionary War

- Part of the American Revolutionary War
Date	April 27, 1777
Location	Danbury and Ridgefield, Connecticut Colony, British America
Result	American victory

Belligerents
United States	Kingdom of Great Britain

Commanders and leaders
Benedict Arnold; David Wooster †; Arthur Silliman	William Tryon; James Agnew; John Erskine

Strength
700	2,000

Casualties and losses
20 killed 80 wounded	154 killed and wounded 40 captured

The Battle of Ridgefield was a series of American Revolutionary War skirmishes in Danbury, Connecticut and Ridgefield, Connecticut, including Tryon's Raid on Danbury and the Battle of Compo Hill.

== History ==
On April 25, a British force under the command of the Royal Governor of the Province of New York, Major General William Tryon, landed at Compo, Connecticut between Fairfield and Norwalk in what is present-day Westport, and marched from there to Danbury. There, they destroyed Continental Army supplies after chasing off a small garrison of troops. Connecticut militia leaders Major General David Wooster, Brigadier General Gold S. Silliman, and Brigadier General Benedict Arnold raised a combined force of roughly 700 Continental Army regular and irregular local militia forces to oppose the British, but could not reach Danbury in time to prevent the destruction of the supplies. Instead, they set out to harass the British on their return to the coast.

On April 27, the company led by Wooster twice attacked Tryon's rear guard during their march south. In the second encounter, Wooster was mortally wounded and died five days later. The main encounter then took place at Ridgefield, where several hundred militia under Arnold's command confronted the British and were driven away in a running battle down the town's main street, but not before inflicting casualties on the British.

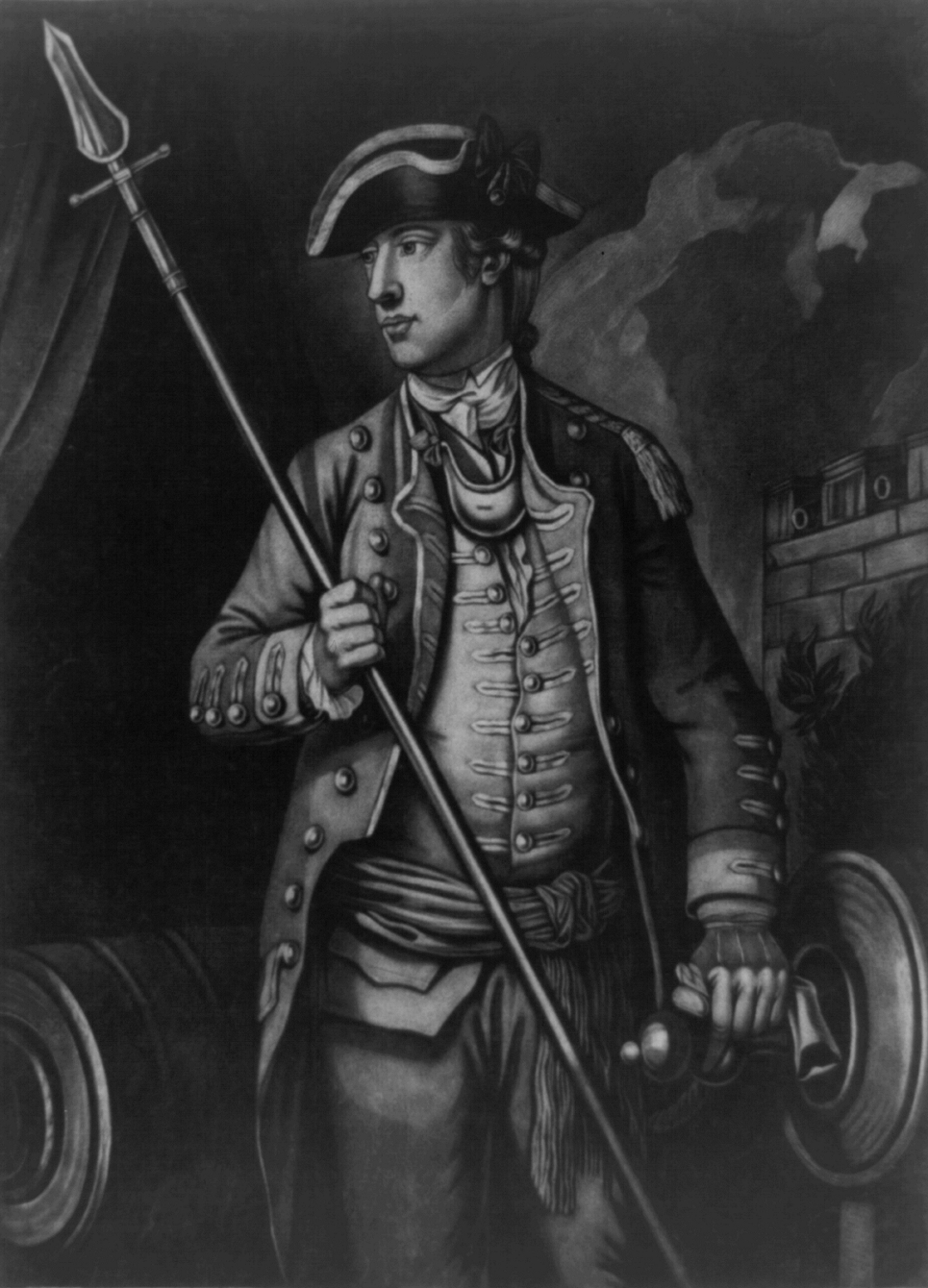
A 1776 depiction of David Wooster

The expedition was a tactical success for the British forces, but their actions in pursuing the raid galvanized Patriot support in Connecticut. While the British again made raids on Connecticut's coastal communities, they made no more raids that penetrated far into the countryside.

=== Background ===
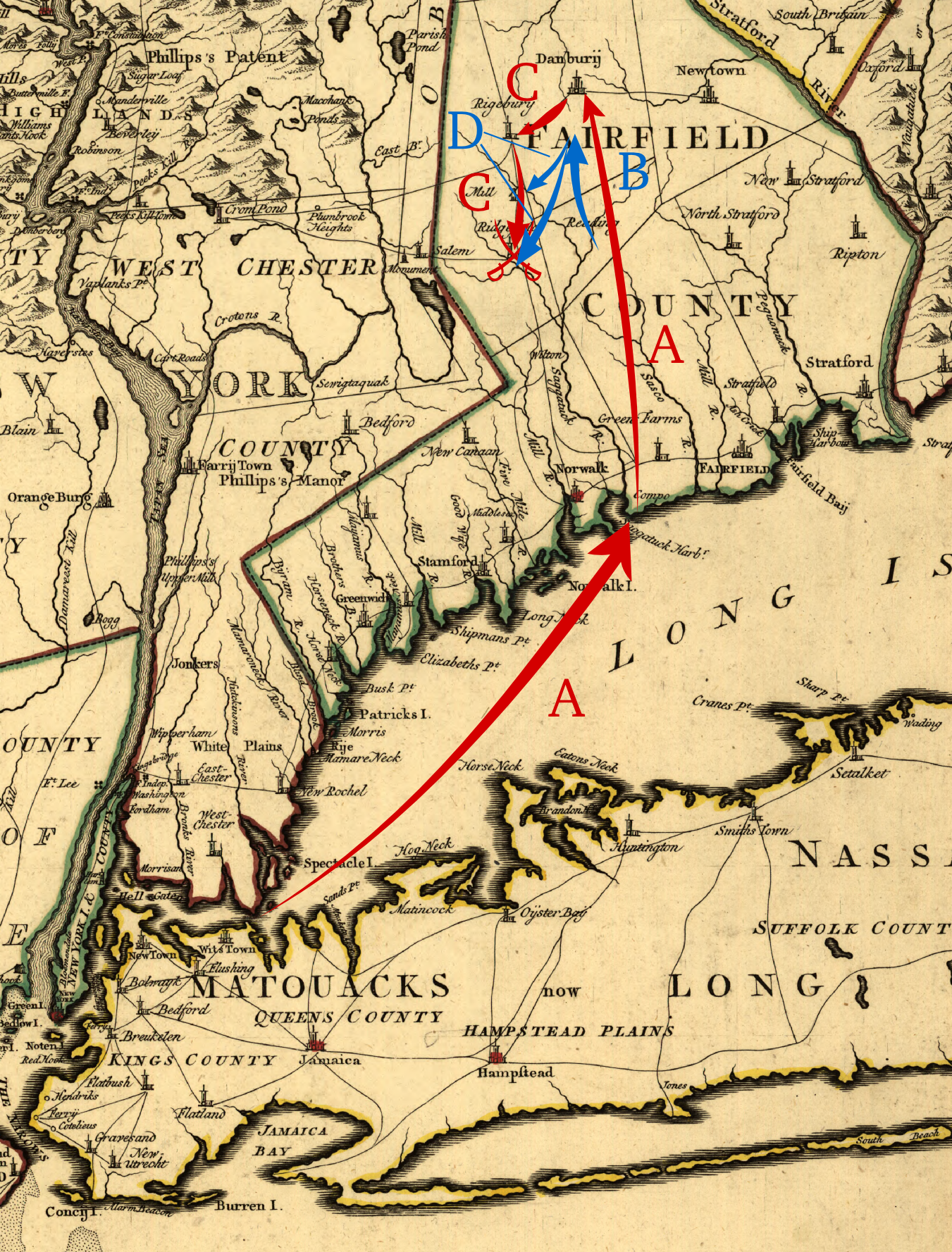
A 1780 map showing movements prior to the battle: A: British movements to Danbury B: American movements toward Danbury C: British movements toward The state of Connecticut was not a scene of conflict during the first two years of the American Revolutionary War, even though the war had begun in neighboring Massachusetts in April 1775, and New York City had been taken by the British in the New York and New Jersey campaign in the fall of 1776. Major General William Howe commanded the British forces in New York, and he drafted a plan for 1777 in which the primary goal was to take the American capital at Philadelphia. Ridgefield D: American movements toward Ridgefield (upper arrow: Wooster, lower arrow: Arnold)

Troops left to defend New York were to include a brigade of 3,000 provincial troops under the command of New York's former royal governor William Tryon, who was given a temporary promotion to "major general of the provincials" in spring 1777. Howe's plan included authorizing Tryon to operate on the Hudson River or to "enter Connecticut as circumstances may point out." Tryon was given one of the early operations of the season, a raid against a Continental Army depot at Danbury, Connecticut. Howe had learned of the depot's existence through a spy working for British Indian agent Guy Johnson, and he had also met with some success in an earlier raid against the Continental Army outpost at Peekskill, New York.

A fleet was assembled consisting of 12 transports, a hospital ship, and some small craft, all under the command of Captain Henry Duncan. The landing force consisted of 1,500 regulars drawn from the 4th, 15th, 23rd, 27th, 44th, and 64th regiments, 300 Loyalists from the Prince of Wales American Regiment led by Montfort Browne, and a small contingent of the 17th Light Dragoons, all led by Generals Sir William Erskine and James Agnew. Command of the entire operation was given to General Tryon, and the fleet sailed from New York on April 22, 1777.

The Danbury depot had been established in 1776 by order of the Second Continental Congress, and it primarily served forces located in the Hudson River valley. In April 1777, the army began mustering regiments for that year's campaigns, and there were about 50 Continental Army soldiers and 100 local militia at Danbury under the command of Joseph Platt Cooke, a local resident and a colonel in the state militia.

=== Danbury ===
The British fleet was first spotted when it passed Norwalk. When the troops landed messengers were dispatched to warn Danbury and local militia leaders of the movements. Generals Wooster and Arnold were in New Haven when messengers reached them on April 26. Wooster immediately sent the local militia to Fairfield. When he and Arnold reached Fairfield, they learned that General Silliman had already departed for Redding, with orders that any militia raised should follow as rapidly as possible; they immediately moved in that direction. The forces assembled at Redding moved toward Danbury in a pouring rain, but had only reached Bethel, about 2 miles (3.2 km) short of Danbury by 11 pm, where they decided to spend the night rather than press on to Danbury with wet gunpowder. The forces consisted of about 500 regular militia members and about 200 volunteers.

== See also ==
- List of American Revolutionary War battles

== Bibliography ==
- Bailey, James Montgomery; Hill, Susan Benedict (1896). History of Danbury, Conn., 1684–1896. Burr Print. House. OCLC 1207718.
- Beatson, Robert (1804). Naval and Military Memoirs of Great Britain, from 1727 to 1783, Volume 6. London: Longman, Hurst, Rees and Orme. OCLC 4643956.
- Boatner, Mark Mayo (1966). Cassell's Biographical Dictionary of the American War of Independence, 1763–1783. London: Cassell & Company. ISBN 0-304-29296-6. OCLC 1627102.
- Burr, William Hanford; Atwell, George C.; Arms, H. Phelps; Miller, Francis Trevelyan (1906). "Invasion of Connecticut by British in the War for American Independence". The Connecticut Magazine. 10. The Connecticut Magazine Company: 139–152.
- Case, James Royal (1927). An Account of Tryon's Raid on Danbury in April, 1777. Danbury, CT: Danbury Print Co. OCLC 1300736.
- Connecticut Historical Society (1997). The Record of Connecticut Men in the Military and Naval Service During the War of the Revolution, 1775–1783. Baltimore, MD: Clearfield. ISBN 978-0-8063-4742-4. OCLC 38505000.
- Ives, J. Moss; Atwell, George C.; Arms, H. Phelps; Miller, Francis Trevelyan (1900). "A Connecticut Battlefield in the American Revolution". The Connecticut Magazine. 7. The Connecticut Magazine Company: 421–450. OCLC 1564863.
- Johnston, Henry, ed. (1889). The Record of Connecticut Men in the Military and Naval Service During the War of the Revolution, 1775–1783. Baltimore, MD: Connecticut Historical Society. ISBN 978-0-8063-4742-4. OCLC 38461894.
- Martin, James Kirby (1997). Benedict Arnold Revolutionary Hero. New York University Press. ISBN 0-8147-5560-7. OCLC 36343341.
- Mather, Frederic (1913). The Refugees of 1776 from Long Island to Connecticut. Albany, NY: J. B. Lyon. ISBN 9780806304953. OCLC 2613390.
- McKay, Ian. "Danbury Raid". The Connecticut Society for the Sons of the American Revolution. Archived from the original on 2011-05-12.
- Moore, Frank (1860). Diary of the American Revolution, Volume I. New York: C. Scribner. p. 427. OCLC 1543121.
- Nelson, Paul David (1990). William Tryon and the Course of Empire A Life in British Imperial Service. Chapel Hill, NC: University of North Carolina Press. ISBN 978-0-8078-1917-3. OCLC 21079316.
- Robertston, A. Heaton (1911). Revolutionary Characters of New Haven. New Haven, CT: Sons of the American Revolution, General David Humphreys Branch. OCLC 4954644.
- Ward, Christopher (1952). The War of the Revolution. New York: Macmillan. OCLC 214962727.
