= Compo, Connecticut =

Census-designated place in Connecticut, United States

- Census-designated place
- Location within Connecticut Location within the United States
- Coordinates: 41°7′18″N 73°21′7″W
- Country: United States
- State: Connecticut
- County: Fairfield
- Town: Westport

Area
  - Total: 1.69 sq mi (4.38 km^{2})
  - Land: 1.69 sq mi (4.38 km^{2})
  - Water: 0 sq mi (0.0 km^{2})
- Elevation: 30 ft (9.1 m)
- Time zone: UTC-5 (Eastern (EST))
  - Summer (DST): UTC-4 (EDT)
- ZIP Code: 06880 (Westport)
- Area codes: 203/475
- FIPS code: 09-16525
- GNIS feature ID: 2805088

Compo is a census-designated place (CDP) in the town of Westport, Fairfield County, Connecticut, United States. It is in the south-central part of the town, lying between the Saugatuck River and the neighborhood of Saugatuck to the west, and Compo Cove, Sherwood Millpond, and the neighborhood of Greens Farms to the east. The CDP extends south to Compo Beach on Long Island Sound and north to U.S. Route 1 (Post Road). Interstate 95 crosses the middle of the CDP from east to west, with access from either Saugatuck or Greens Farms. As of the 2020 census, Compo had a population of 3,354.

Compo was first listed as a CDP prior to the 2020 census. The Compo–Owenoke Historic District is in the southern part of the CDP.

== Demographics ==
=== 2020 census ===
As of the 2020 census, Compo had a population of 3,354. The median age was 47.2 years. 25.3% of residents were under the age of 18 and 17.1% of residents were 65 years of age or older. For every 100 females there were 93.0 males, and for every 100 females age 18 and over there were 89.6 males age 18 and over.

100.0% of residents lived in urban areas, while 0.0% lived in rural areas.

There were 1,260 households in Compo, of which 39.5% had children under the age of 18 living in them. Of all households, 60.5% were married-couple households, 12.9% were households with a male householder and no spouse or partner present, and 22.9% were households with a female householder and no spouse or partner present. About 20.6% of all households were made up of individuals and 10.5% had someone living alone who was 65 years of age or older.

There were 1,382 housing units, of which 8.8% were vacant. The homeowner vacancy rate was 1.6% and the rental vacancy rate was 8.7%.

Racial composition as of the 2020 census
Race	Number	Percent
White	2,794	83.3%
Black or African American	63	1.9%
American Indian and Alaska Native	4	0.1%
Asian	176	5.2%
Native Hawaiian and Other Pacific Islander	0	0.0%
Some other race	42	1.3%
Two or more races	275	8.2%
Hispanic or Latino (of any race)	194	5.8%
