= David Wooster =

American military officer during the American Revolutionary War

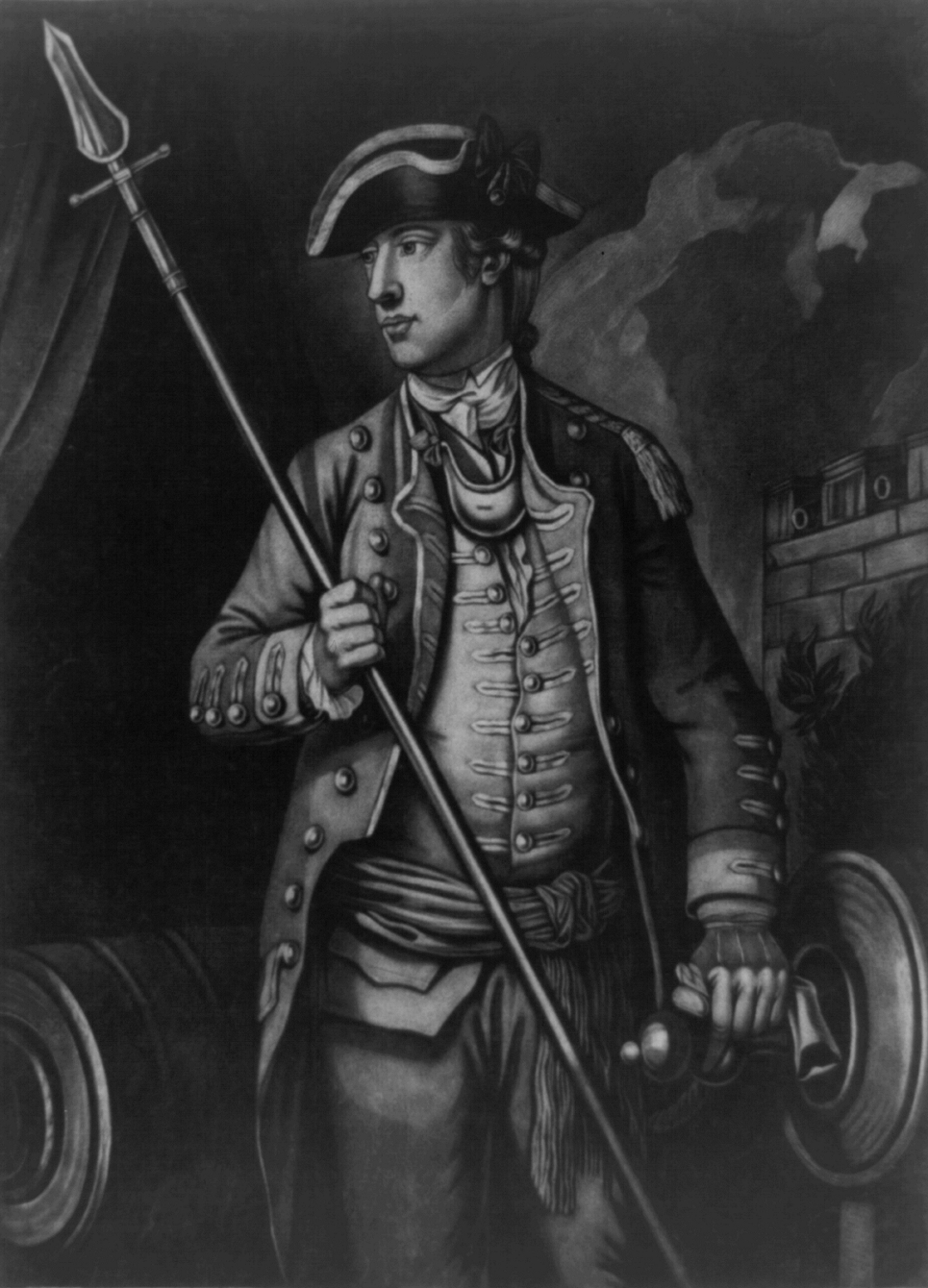
- 1776 mezzotint by Thomas Hart (artist's conception, not made from life)
- Born: March 13, 1711; Stratford, Connecticut Colony
- Died: May 2, 1777 (aged 66); Danbury, Connecticut
- Burial place: Wooster Cemetery, Danbury
- Military career
- Allegiance: British Empire; United States of America
- Branch: British colonial militia British Army; Continental Army
- Service years: British colonial militia: 1739–1745; British Army: 1745–1761; Continental Army: 1775–1777
- Rank: Major General
- Commands: Montreal, Connecticut militia
- Conflicts: King George's War; Siege of Louisbourg; French and Indian War; Battle of Carillon; Battle of Ticonderoga; American Revolutionary War; Canadian campaign; Siege of Fort St. Jean; Battle of Ridgefield (DOW)

David Wooster (March 13, 1711 [O.S. March 2, 1710] – May 2, 1777) was an American general who served in the French and Indian War and in the American Revolutionary War. He died of wounds sustained during the Battle of Ridgefield, Connecticut. Several cities, schools, and public places were named after him thereafter. He has been called "a largely forgotten hero of the Revolution".

== Early years ==
David Wooster was born in Stratford, in the British colony of Connecticut. He entered Yale College in 1735, and graduated in 1738.

In 1739, following the outbreak of war between Britain and Spain, he joined the colonial militia as a lieutenant, but apparently saw no action. In 1741 he was named lieutenant of a ship of the guarda-costa, which the colony had established to protect against potential Spanish attack. He was later promoted to captain.

On March 6, 1745, Wooster married Marie Clapp, the daughter of Yale's president, Thomas Clapp. They went on to have four children; their son Thomas also served in the American Revolutionary War. His grandson Charles Whiting Wooster was Commander-in-Chief of the Chilean Navy. Shortly after his marriage, David Wooster was named captain of a company in the provincial regiment of Andrew Burr (uncle to future United States Vice President Aaron Burr), and saw service at that year's Siege of Louisbourg. He was sent to France as part of the prisoner escort following that action, and then to England, where he was given an audience with King George and a position as captain in the regiment of William Pepperrell in the British Army.

When the French and Indian War broke out, he served from 1755 to the war's end in 1761, during which he was promoted to colonel and given command of the 3rd Connecticut Regiment. In 1758 his regiment was at the disastrous Battle of Carillon before Fort Ticonderoga, and in 1759 at the successful capture of Ticonderoga.

== Early Revolutionary War service ==
When the American Revolutionary War broke out with the Battles of Lexington and Concord in April 1775, Wooster was in charge of the militia at New Haven. Benedict Arnold wanted to march with his militia company in support of the cause, but Wooster tried to deny Arnold access to the militia's weapons stores. Arnold's threats were persuasive, and Wooster opened the magazine to him. (This confrontation is commemorated in New Haven as Powder House Day.) Wooster was first given command as a major general of Connecticut militia companies sent to defend New York City against possible British troop landings. When the Continental Army was established, Wooster was commissioned a brigadier general, and his troops were sent to be part of General Philip Schuyler and General Richard Montgomery's 1775 invasion of Quebec. Wooster participated in the Siege of Fort St. Jean in the fall of 1775, and was then given military command of Montreal after that city fell in November. He assumed command of all the forces in Quebec following the death of Montgomery in the Battle of Quebec at the end of December 1775.

Wooster's management of Montreal was marked by deteriorating relations with the inhabitants, as efforts to rein in Loyalist activity ended up frustrating even sympathetic locals. He was eventually charged with incompetence over his tenure at Montreal; the court martial cleared him. In April 1776 Wooster took reinforcements to relieve General Arnold, who was besieging Quebec City. Wooster was only briefly in command there, as General John Thomas arrived at the end of April. In early May, British reinforcements arrived at Quebec, and the army was routed, eventually retreating in disarray back to Fort Ticonderoga in July.

Wooster returned to Connecticut, where he assumed command of the entire provincial militia responsible for the state's defense as the state's first major general.

== Danbury raid ==
British General (and former provincial governor of New York) William Tryon launched an expedition in April 1777 to raid a Continental Army supply depot at Danbury, Connecticut. On April 25, about 2,000 British troops landed near Fairfield, and marched inland, reaching Danbury without resistance on the morning of April 26. They chased away the small garrison, destroyed a large number of supplies, and set fire to parts of the town. When Wooster was alerted to this movement, he notified General Arnold, who was visiting his family in New Haven, and set about calling out the militia to oppose the action. Arnold took several hundred men to set up a position at Ridgefield, while Wooster took a smaller detachment to harass the rear of Tryon's column as they returned to the coast. His first attack caught Tryon by surprise, but he was prepared for Wooster's second attack, which was made as the column neared Ridgefield. Wooster was mortally wounded when the Redcoats unlimbered six artillery pieces and opened fire. He was taken to the Dibble House in Danbury where he died on May 2, 1777. Wooster's final words were, "I am dying, but with a strong hope and persuasion that my country will gain her independence."

== Memorials ==
On June 17, 1777, Congress voted that a suitable monument should be erected in his memory, but measures were never inaugurated to execute the resolution. His grave was not identified until 1854, when Connecticut legislature laid the cornerstone of a monument. A sign and a monument on Connecticut Route 116 (North Salem Road) just a few yards away from the intersection with Tackora Trail, marks the spot where General David Wooster fell, during the Battle of Ridgefield in 1777. Today, a monument 30 feet (9.1 m) high marks his final resting place. General Wooster is buried in Wooster Cemetery on Mount Moriah in Danbury, which dates from the middle of the nineteenth century. Wooster's monument is surrounded by a stone and iron railing. The monument is heavily carved with a variety of military and Masonic symbols, as well as classical Greek motifs. Among extensive information carved into the monument is this quote, "Of his country Wooster said, 'my life has ever been devoted to her services from my youth up, though never before in a cause like this—a cause for which I would most cheerfully risk and lay down my life'." He is also memorialized at Grove Street Cemetery on New Haven.

His death is subject of a poem ("On the Death of General Wooster") by Phillis Wheatley, included in a letter Wheatley wrote to the General's widow, Mary, on July 15, 1778.

In the 1820s, the city of New Haven converted a small pasture into a public square and named it Wooster Square after Wooster. Today, the entire neighborhood, as well as several streets, all carry Wooster's name. The neighborhood was the center of large-scale Italian immigration to the city in the late 19th and early 20th centuries, and still retains a large Italian presence today.

Wooster School, a private day school, Wooster Mountain State Park and numerous streets are named after Wooster in Danbury, Bethel, and Ridgefield. Also named for him are David Wooster Middle School, a public school in Stratford, Connecticut, a street in SoHo, New York City, and the city of Wooster, Ohio (which houses the College of Wooster and the appropriately named Wooster High School Generals).

Ben Douglass, in his 1878 history of Wayne County, Ohio, characterized Wooster as "a man of prepossessing appearance, of rare intellectual culture and accomplished education."

== See also ==
- Charles Whiting Wooster
