= Portrait of Horatio Gates =

Painting by Gilbert Stuart

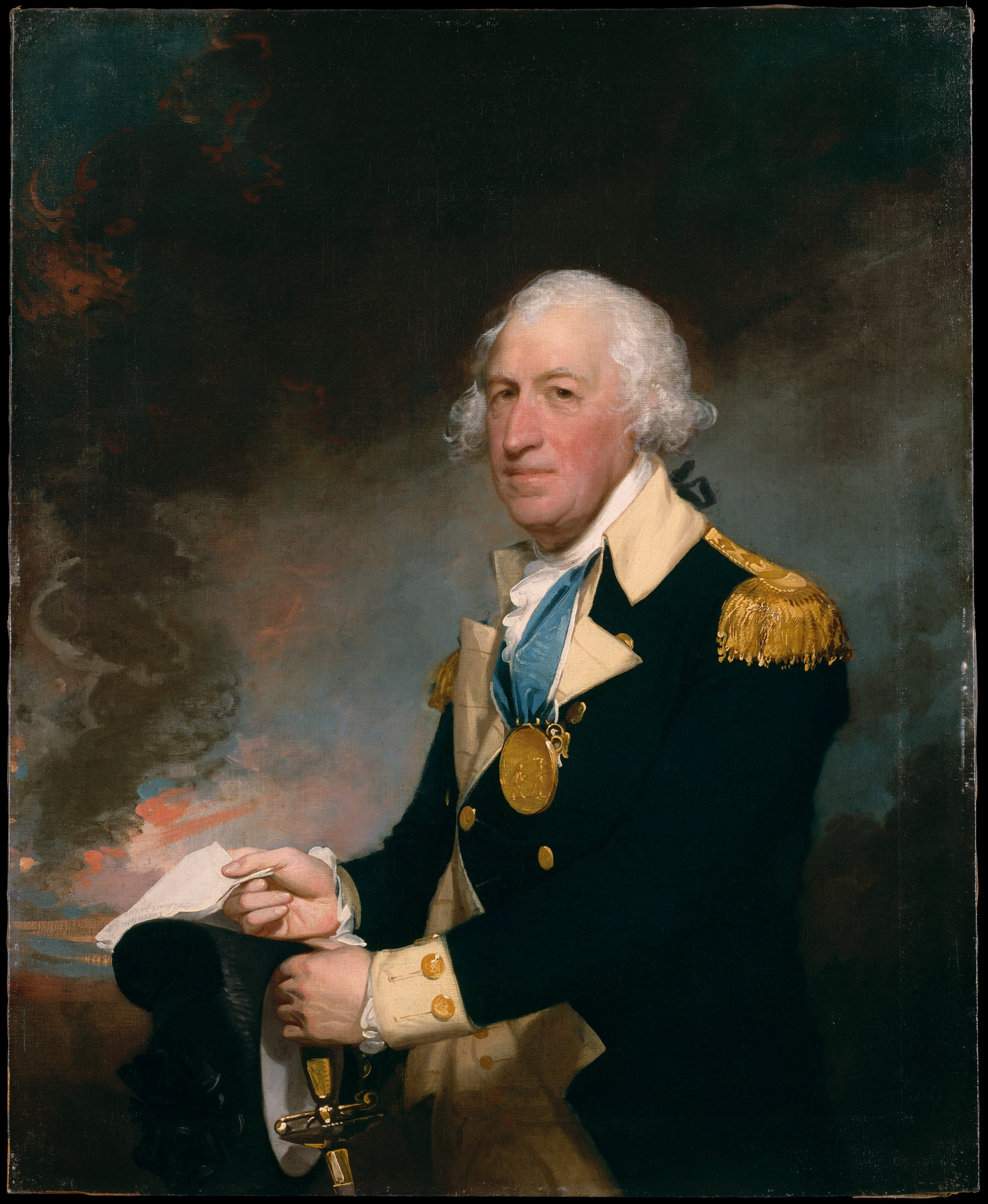
- Artist: Gilbert Stuart
- Year: 1793-94
- Type: Oil on canvas, portrait painting
- Dimensions: 112.4 cm × 91.1 cm (44.3 in × 35.9 in)
- Location: Metropolitan Museum of Art, New York City

Portrait of Horatio Gates is a portrait painting by the American artist Gilbert Stuart. It depicts the British-American soldier Horatio Gates.

Born in England and a career soldier in the British Army, Gates settled in America and served in the Continental Army during the American Revolutionary War. Notable for his victory at Saratoga and his defeat at Camden, the Conway Cabal at one point unsuccessfully tried to replace George Washington with Gates.

Although he had retired from military service in 1784, Stuart depicts him in the blue and buff uniform of an American major general. The painting celebrates him as the victor of Saratoga. He wears the commemorative gold medal struck by Congress and holds a copy of the convention he signed with British commander John Burgoyne.

After eighteen years away in Britain and Ireland, Stuart returned to America to escape his creditors. He painted Gates during a brief period in New York before moving on to the capital Philadelphia. Gates and the artist got on well and drank large amounts of Stuart's madeira during the sitting. Reflecting Stuart's years in London it has been described "a distinctly British portrait, combining the painterly mastery of Gainsborough with the tight clarity of Romney". The painting was owned by the family of Gates' friend Colonel Ebenezer Stevens. Today it is in the collection of the Metropolitan Museum of Art in New York.

== See also ==
- Portrait of John Burgoyne, a painting by Joshua Reynolds of Gates' opponent at Saratoga
- Surrender of General Burgoyne, a painting by John Trumbull featuring Gates

== Bibliography ==
- Barratt, Carrie Rebora & Miles, Ellen G. Gilbert Stuart. Metropolitan Museum of Art, 2004.
- Broadwater, Robert P. American Generals of the Revolutionary War: A Biographical Dictionary. McFarland, 2012.
- Staiti, Paul. Of Arms and Artists: The American Revolution through Painters' Eyes. Bloomsbury Publishing USA, 2016.
