= Powder House Day =

Powder House Day is an event celebrating Bennedict Arnold getting the Selectmen of New Haven to give the Second Company Governor's Footguard the keys to the Powder House. The event has been celebrated since 1904.

== Background ==
To celebrate the day, the Governor's Foot Guard marches from the Goffe Street armory and parades on the Green. The celebration takes place in April.

The painting "Benedict Arnold Demands The Powder House Key April 22, 1775" by Morton Kunstler depicts the events of the Powder House. The painting is displayed in New Haven City Hall.

== History ==
On April 24, 1775, Elm City learnt of the Battles of Lexington and Concord. The Second Company Governor's Footguard, led by Bennedict Arnold, went to Beer's Tavern and demanded access to the gunpowder held by the city after the footguard voted to join the battle. The selectmen voted to stay neutral, but, after Arnold threatened to take the gunpowder if his men were not given access to it, they gave the key.

The event has been celebrated in New Haven since 1904. In 1978, William Gargano was the commandant of the Governor's Foot Guard. As of 2018, Richard Greenalch is the commandant of the Second Company Governor's Footguard.
