= Action at Osborne's =

- Part of the American Revolutionary War
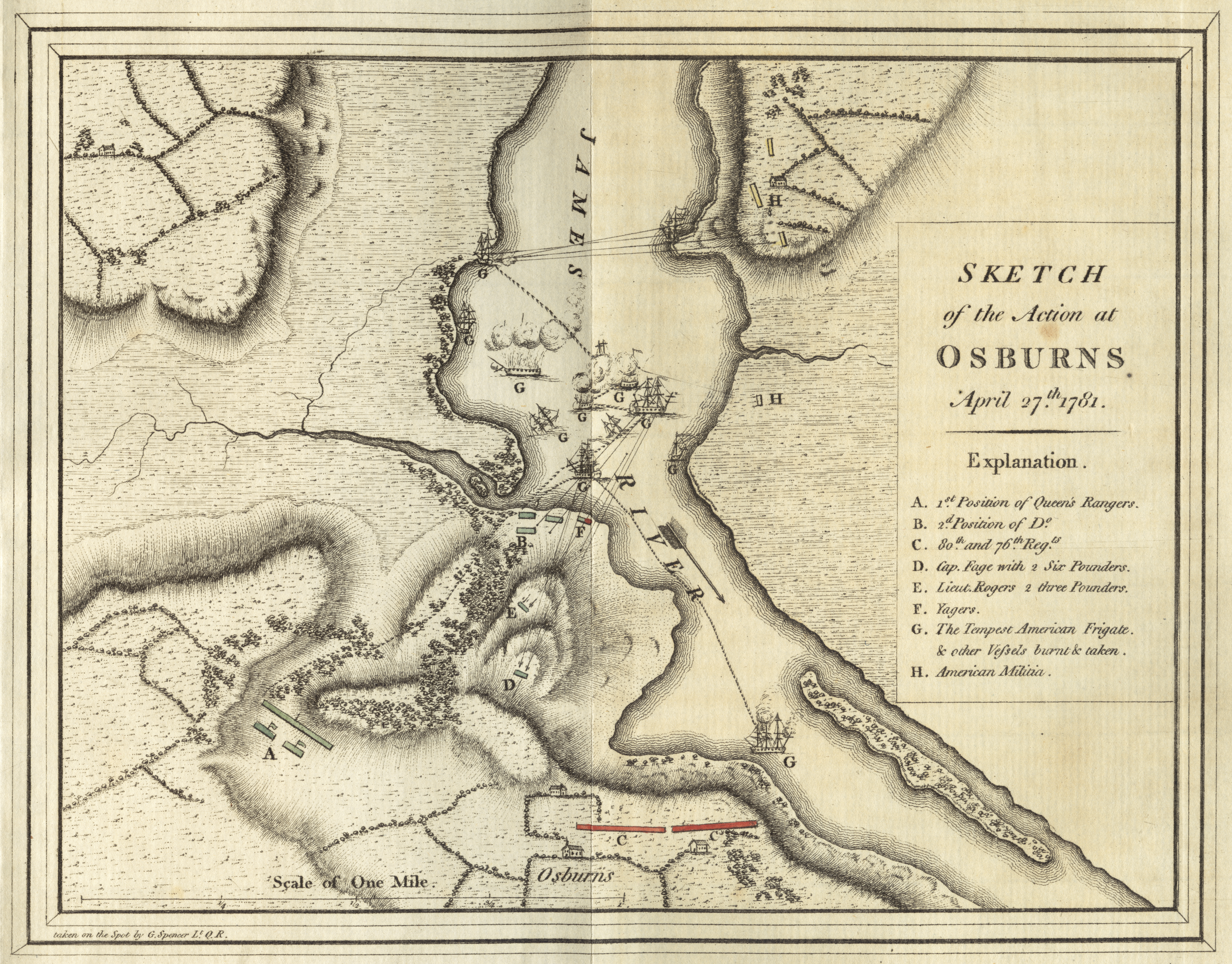
- Map of the engagement
| Date | April 27, 1781 |
| Location | James River at Osborne's, Chesterfield County, Virginia |
| Result | British Victory |

Belligerents
| United States | Great Britain |

Commanders and leaders
| Unknown | Benedict Arnold |

Units involved
| Virginia State Navy; Virginia Militia | 76th Regiment of Foot; 80th Regiment of Foot; Queen's Rangers; American Legion |

Casualties and losses
| No fatalities Numerous vessels sunk or captured | None |

The action at Osborne's (sometimes spelled Osburn's or Osborns), Virginia was a minor naval–land engagement on April 27, 1781, in the James River during the American Revolutionary War. The battle resulted in the near-complete destruction of the Virginia State Navy as well as a large stockpile of Virginian tobacco (in use as a currency at the time).

== Action ==
With American troops having been driven from Petersburg at the Battle of Blandford, and the tobacco stored the having been destroyed, on April 27, the British Army left in search of fresh supplies.

British General William Phillips, with the light-infantry, and part of the jägers, and of the cavalry of the Queen's Rangers, marched to Chesterfield Court House, where he destroyed a range of barracks which could accommodate two thousand men, three hundred barrels of flour, and other stores. At the same time, General Benedict Arnold moved to Osborne's, a small village on the south side of the James River, about 15 miles (24 km) south of Richmond, with the Seventy-sixth and Eightieth regiments, part of the Yagers and of the Queen's Rangers, and the American Legion.

Osborne's was the rendezvous of the small force of the Virginia State Navy which had been collected with the intention of co-operating with the French fleet in a projected attempt against Portsmouth. It appears somewhat singular that it should have been allowed to remain in so exposed a situation while the enemy remained within striking distance.

The British conducted their movements in secret, taking care that no information of there should reach the Americans. Consequently, the British forces came into their immediate vicinity of the Americans before their presence was known. Arnold summoned the American commander to surrender, "offering one half the contents of their cargoes in case they did not destroy any part." The nameless American commander sent word, in answer, "We are determined and ready to defend our ships, and will sink them rather than surrender."

On the receipt of this reply, General Arnold ordered two three-pounders, under Lieutenant Rogers, to open a fire on the stern of Tempest, a state ship mounting twenty guns. Captain Page, with two six-pounders, "opened from an unexpected quarter, with great effect." At the same time Lieutenant Spencer led a party of Yagers, "by a route partly covered with ditches, within thirty yards of her stern," in order that all who showed themselves on deck might be picked off.

Tempest, Renown of twenty-six guns, Jefferson of fourteen guns, and some smaller vessels, as well as by a body of Virginia militia, who occupied the northern bank of the river, all opened a brisk fire. When the greatly superior force of the British forces is considered, the contest was too unequal to be either long-continued or successful to the Americans. A shot from one of the British pieces cut Tempest's cable; she sheered around, and exposed herself to a raking fire from Lieutenant Rogers' three-pounders; the crew, taking to the boats, attempted to escape. As the British had no boats, and the wind was blowing quite hard, Arnold could not take advantage of the panic into which the entire squadron appears to have fallen.

The British captured two ships, three brigs, two schooners, and five sloops, all laden with tobacco, flour, cordage, etc.,. They burned or sank four ships, five brigs, and several smaller vessels, similarly laden. Upwards of two thousand hogsheads of tobacco, besides other stores, were destroyed, without any loss to the British, and if any loss, except that of the property, was sustained by the Virginians, it has not been recorded. The result of these predatory expeditions was a terrible blow to Virginia, — her tobacco being her circulating medium, — and, indirectly, to the cause of America.

In the ensuing days, Philips and Arnold marched northward until stopping in Manchester, Virginia (a port town across the James River from Richmond).

== Citation and references ==
Citations

References

- Henry B. Dawson, Battles of the United States, by Sea and Land (1858) available at the Internet Archive
- Benson Lossing, The Pictorial Field Book of the Revolution (1860 ed.) available at the Internet Archive
- John Franklin Dobbs, From Bunker Hill to Manila Bay (1906: New York City) available at the Internet Archive
- Charles Oscar Paullin The Administration of the Massachusetts and Virginia Navies of the American Revolution (1906), p. 163 available at the Internet Archive
