= Joseph Ranger =

Joseph Ranger may refer to:

- Joseph Ranger (seaman), a Black Virginian sailor in the American Revolutionary War
- Joseph Ranger, one of the Parti crédit social uni candidates in the 1985 Quebec provincial election
