= Joseph Ranger (seaman) =

American seaman in the Revolutionary War

Joseph Ranger (c. 1760–unknown) was a free Black seaman who served as a sailor on the patriot side in the American Revolutionary War. He enlisted in the Virginia State Navy at the start of the war and served until 1787 on four vessels, making him the longest-serving Black Virginian sailor of that era.

== Early life and enlistment ==
Joseph Ranger was born around 1760 in Virginia. (Note: During sworn testimony in 1832, Ranger put his age at about 72.) By 1776, he was living as a free Black man in Northumberland County. According to the American National Biography, Ranger likely had seafaring experience and familiarity with navigating Virginia's coastal rivers, as did many free and enslaved Black workers in the area.

In the lead-up to the Revolutionary War, the Colony of Virginia began organizing a state navy to support the Continental Navy and defend Virginia waters from the British Royal Navy. They mustered about 40 water vessels, mostly re-outfitted commercial craft. Though White Virginian politicians were concerned about supplying Black soldiers with weapons, (Note: Despite their concern, many Black Virginians fought in the revolutionary land forces. Historian Luther Porter Jackson estimated that there were at most 1,000 free Black men in Virginia of fighting age and that 500 of them served in sea or land combat roles. The 150 he named are about evenly divided between navy and army/militia, but he suspected that "perhaps the largest number" served at sea.) they actively recruited experienced Black crew members for their Navy.

Ranger enlisted in early 1776 and served at the rank of ordinary seaman.

== Revolutionary War ==
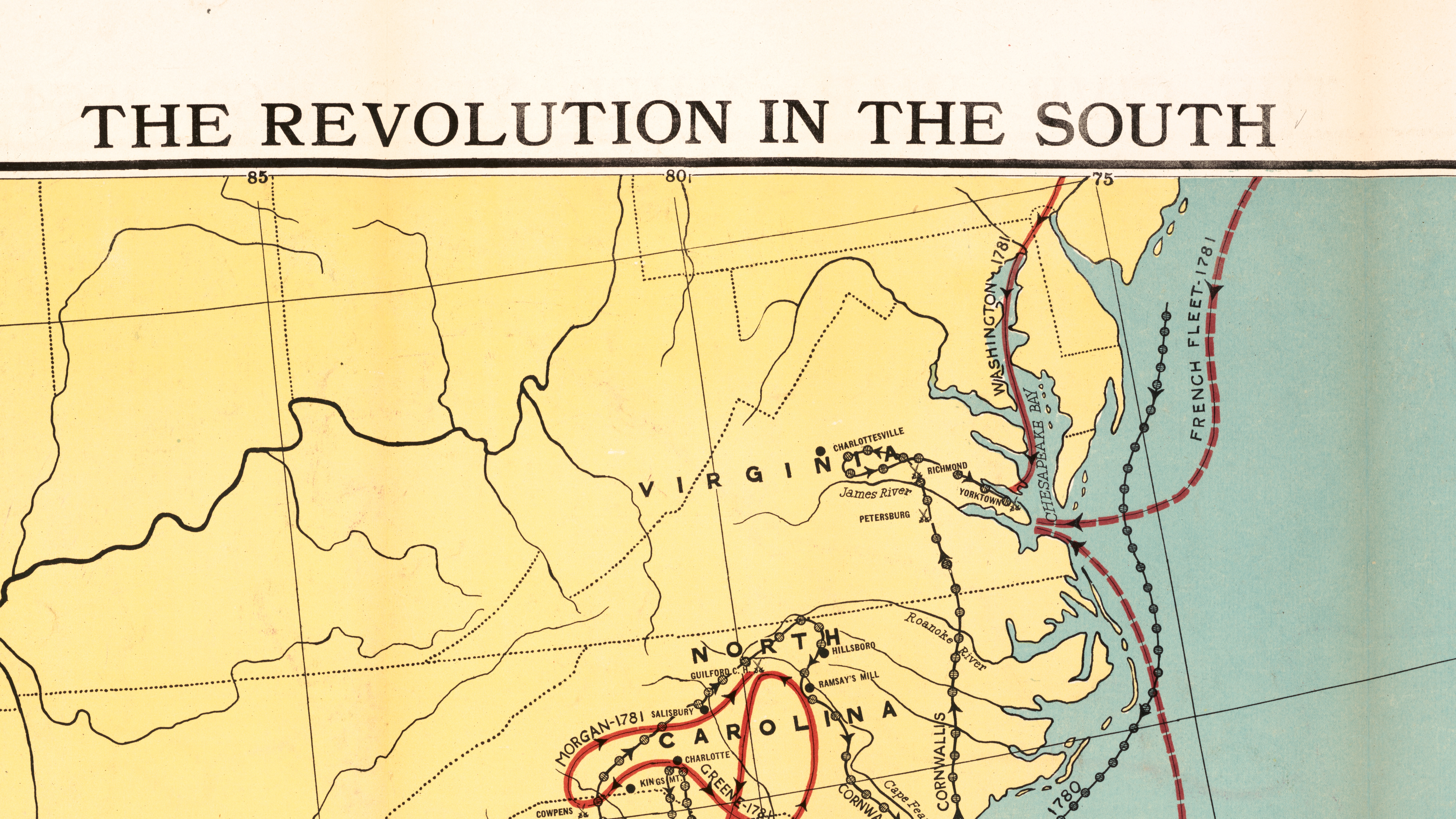
Map of major Revolutionary War battles in the Virginia area

Ranger was assigned first to the Hero, a row galley built to patrol the James River area; it had a shallow draft for maneuverability in the river and room for a crew of about fifty. Many ships in the Virginia Navy had mixed-race crews, and the Hero had one of the highest ratios of Black crew members.

After three months, Ranger was transferred to the Dragon (built in Fredericksburg), on which he served with four other Black crew mates out of about one hundred total. Historian Luther Porter Jackson wrote that Ranger and the other Black seamen shared meals with, socialized with, and were at least sometimes given the same rations as the White crew. During one recorded month on the Dragon, Ranger received the same share of "ample supply of pork, flour and spirits" as the rest. At some point during his four years' service on the Dragon, it was sunk. In 1780, it was raised again and converted to a fire ship. (Note: In a plot approved by Thomas Jefferson, the navy planned to use the Dragon to attack a ship holding Benedict Arnold. The plan, delayed due to the Dragon running aground, was discovered by the British and abandoned.)

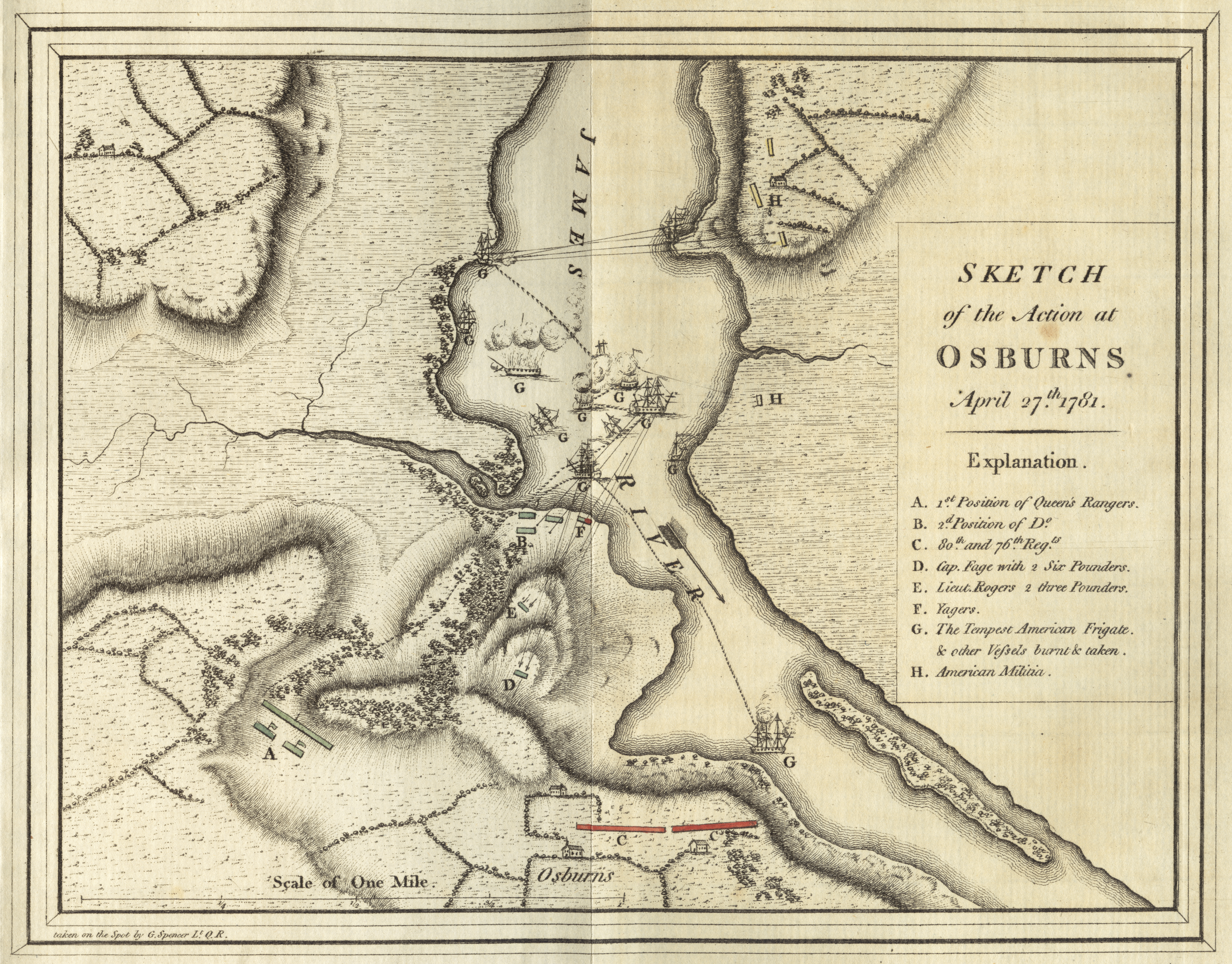
Sketch of the Action at Osburns, 1781 map

Ranger transferred again after the conversion of the Dragon, this time to the Jefferson, a brig. He served aboard it for one year. In 1781, Ranger survived the crippling of the Jefferson, which was destroyed by the British in the action at Osborne's on the James River along with most of the Virginia Navy vessels. Ranger then served on the Patriot for about six months, until he and the rest of the crew were captured by the British. After Lord Cornwallis surrendered after the Siege of Yorktown, Ranger and the others were released. Ranger ended the war having served on four vessels, the highest number of any Black sailor in the war.

== Post-war service ==
Virginia's leaders continued to be concerned about the possibility of British attacks. The Congress of the Confederation granted the state permission to retain two navy ships, the Patriot and the Liberty, among the small number of vessels that had not been destroyed in the war. Ranger worked on both ships, remaining in the navy until its dissolution in 1787. His eleven years of service are the longest on record of any Black seaman in the Virginia Navy.

During his post-war service, the Virginia government began rewarding soldiers and sailors who fought in the war with land. It granted plots in two westerly Virginia territories: Kentucky County and the Virginia Military District, parts of present-day Kentucky and Ohio, respectively. (Note: The other states and the United States government similarly rewarded veterans with land grants. Virginia gave out more land than the others.) Ranger was granted 100 acres, the amount commonly given to privates and seamen. Two historians, Jackson and Sarah J. Purcell, both write that Ranger likely sold the land to speculators rather than move his family westward, as did most land grantees. Ranger also continued to draw a salary. State records show that he was paid 2.50 pounds for a month's work in 1786. Ranger earned enough to purchase the freedom of his wife. He had other enslaved family members he was unable to help.

== Later life ==
As Ranger and the other veterans of the revolution aged, successive United States Congresses awarded them pensions. They passed laws disbursing money in 1818, 1820, and 1832, requiring a court deposition to prove war service. Ranger appeared at an Elizabeth City County court in 1832 for his deposition, receiving thereafter 96 dollars per year. He was one of thirteen Black Virginian veterans to receive a federal pension that year.

The details of Ranger's death are unknown. According to Purcell, Ranger's service "exemplifies the importance of African Americans to American military forces, even in states such as Virginia with extremely restrictive slave systems".

== See also ==
- Virginia in the American Revolution
- African Americans in the American Revolution
