= Raid on Richmond =

Battle of the American Revolutionary War

- Part of the American Revolutionary War
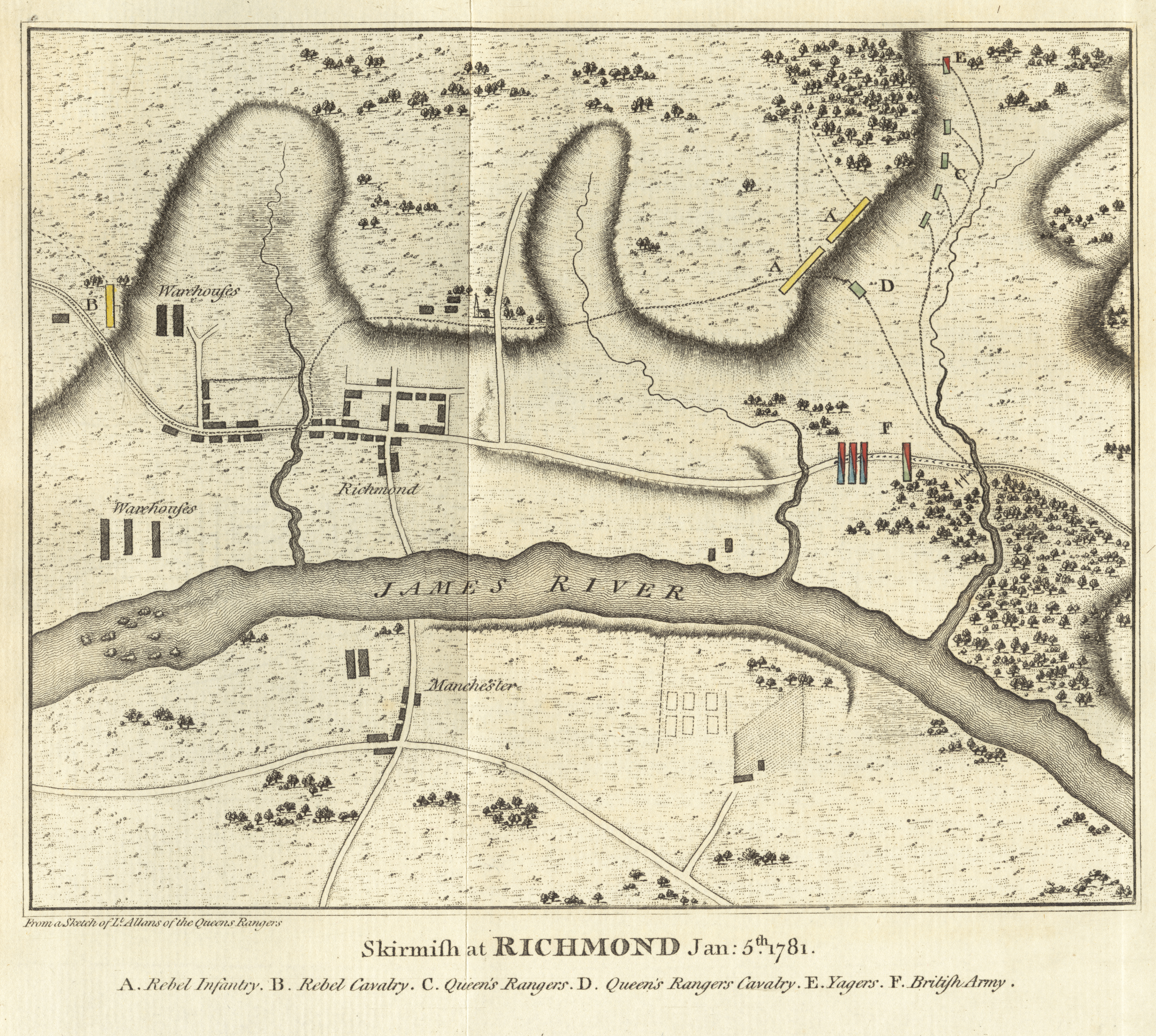
- British map of the attack on Richmond, January 5th 1781
Date	January 1–19, 1781
Location	present-day Richmond, Virginia, and the surrounding area
Result	British victory: Severe damage was done to Richmond

Belligerents
United States	Great Britain

Commanders and leaders
Thomas Jefferson; Sampson Mathews	Sir Henry Clinton; Benedict Arnold; John Graves Simcoe

Strength
Around 200 Virginia Militiamen	1,600 troops of the Loyalist American Legion

Casualties and losses
Unknown, presumably heavy	Unknown, possibly moderate

The Raid on Richmond was a series of British military actions against the capital of Virginia, Richmond, and the surrounding area, during the American Revolutionary War. Led by American defector Benedict Arnold, the Richmond campaign is considered one of his greatest successes while serving under the British Army. It shocked patriot leaders and is considered one of his most notorious actions by modern Americans.

== Background ==
Lieutenant General Sir Henry Clinton hoped that sending an American-born commander to Richmond would convince more Loyalists in the area to join the British cause, which would subsequently give the British Army the upper hand in the Southern theater of the war.

Before the beginning of the raid, Thomas Jefferson, the governor of Virginia, had moved the capital of Virginia from Williamsburg to Richmond, because of its strategically central, defensible location. In the event of an attack, Jefferson moved all of the town's military supplies to a foundry five miles outside of Richmond.

== Richmond campaign ==
From January 1 to January 3, Arnold's fleet sailed up the James River, laying waste to Patriot plantations and settlements along the way. On January 4, the British made camp at Westover Plantation, where they would ready themselves for the assault against Richmond. In the afternoon, Arnold and his men disembarked on foot towards the city.

The following day, Arnold's force of Loyalist "greencoats", consisting of infantry, dragoons, and artillery, arrived at Richmond, which was defended by approximately 200 militiamen. His timing was excellent; most of the defenders were nearing the end of their enlistment periods and were so confident that Richmond was safe from attack that they had not bothered to establish defenses or post sentries.

Upon seeing the disorganized state of the militia, Colonel John Graves Simcoe of the Queen's Rangers ordered his men to engage them right away. The militiamen fired off a single volley at the advancing British before retreating in panic towards the woods, with the Loyalist detachment chasing after them. Jefferson, seeing his militiamen dispersed and no other plausible way to defend Richmond, quickly ordered the mass evacuation of most military supplies from the city. He and his family fled by carriage as other top government officials scrambled to make their own escapes.

At noon, Arnold's forces marched triumphantly into the city, described by an eyewitness as "undisturbed by even a single shot." From his headquarters at Main Street's city tavern (he would only stay in Richmond for a day), Arnold wrote a letter to Jefferson stating that he would leave the city in peace if allowed to seize every parcel of tobacco he could find. Jefferson refused the terms, and the city suffered the consequences.

Upon receiving the letter the next day, on January 6, Arnold was enraged, and ordered Richmond to be set to the torch. Arnold's men then started a rampage across the city, burning government buildings as well as private homes, ransacking the city of its valuables and supplies. A strong wind spread the flames even more, adding to the destruction. After most of Richmond was burned and its valuables sacked, Arnold led his forces outside of Richmond and to the Westham cannon foundry, destroying it along with all of the valuable supplies stored within. After completing their destruction, Arnold's troops moved on to the undefended port town of Warwick (across the James River, in Chesterfield County), and began another spree of destruction, burning down homes and looting buildings.

When the news of Richmond's destruction reached Jefferson, he was aghast. Arnold's force had entered Virginia's very capital, unopposed, and had singlehandedly defiled it. The governor called on Sampson Mathews, commander of Virginia's state militia, and ordered him to assault Arnold's forces. Mathews built up a force of around 200 militiamen and embarked hastily to catch and damage Arnold's slow-moving army near Richmond.

Eventually, delayed by bad weather, sickness, and mutiny, Mathews and his troops caught up with Arnold's army and attacked it by surprise. Using nimble tactics popularized by American commander Nathanael Greene, the militiamen easily outfought the exhausted Loyalists, and over the following days, the British ranks were thinned by multiple skirmishes around Richmond and the James River. Eventually, Arnold considered the skirmishes between his American Legion and the Patriots to be so serious that he ordered his army to retreat to Portsmouth to set up defensive fortifications there and wait for reinforcements.

Thus, Arnold's army moved quickly down the James River, burning more plantations and homes in their wake, while still being chased by Mathews. One of the plantations that Arnold's men burned on their retreat was that of Berkeley, the home of Founding Father Benjamin Harrison V. Harrison was going about his regular duties in his mansion when he saw the British force advancing towards his plantation. He quickly informed his wife and children, and they then escaped by carriage. Arnold knew that Berkeley belonged to Harrison, whom he viewed as a traitor, and wanted to punish him for treason against Great Britain. All of the Harrison family's portraits and artwork were taken outside to be burned, and 40 of Harrison's slaves were confiscated. Arnold spared Harrison's mansion and houses, however, as he believed the war would soon be won by the British, and desired a grand plantation in which to live after the war. The only original portrait of Harrison to survive was the miniature around his wife's neck, wearing she wore as she fled from Arnold's forces.

On January 19, the Richmond campaign ended when Benedict Arnold's weary troops reached Portsmouth. They had survived a great ordeal, and Arnold was praised by local Loyalists, as well as his superiors, for being a hero. On the same day, Major General William Phillips arrived to relieve Arnold with 2,000 fresh troops and to assume command over Portsmouth's defenses.

== Aftermath ==
The destruction of Richmond, one of the most important cities in the United States, outraged the American populace. George Washington was so angered and humiliated by the destruction of Richmond that he put a 5,000 guinea bounty on Arnold's head and ordered his aide, the Marquis de Lafayette, to hang Arnold if he encountered him in battle. Continental marksmen were issued targets painted in Benedict's appearance to practice on, in the event they saw him.

The British, on the other hand, saw Arnold's victory at Richmond as a turning point and gave them hope that Loyalists could rise with them and quell the Patriot presence in the South. Many slaves were liberated from the raided plantations, as well as Richmond itself, and many of them promptly joined the British Army afterwards, in exchange for their freedom. After Arnold's initial raid on the James River and the area around Richmond, more minor raids ensued. British commanders like William Phillips and Banastre Tarleton followed in Arnold's example, raiding and burning more outlying towns and preying on Continental troops. Benedict Arnold, the Continental Army's brilliant General, had guaranteed himself a place in the British ranks with the Richmond Campaign.

== See also ==
- American Revolutionary War § War in the South. Places 'Raid of Richmond' in overall sequence and strategic context.
