= American Legion (Great Britain) =

British military unit

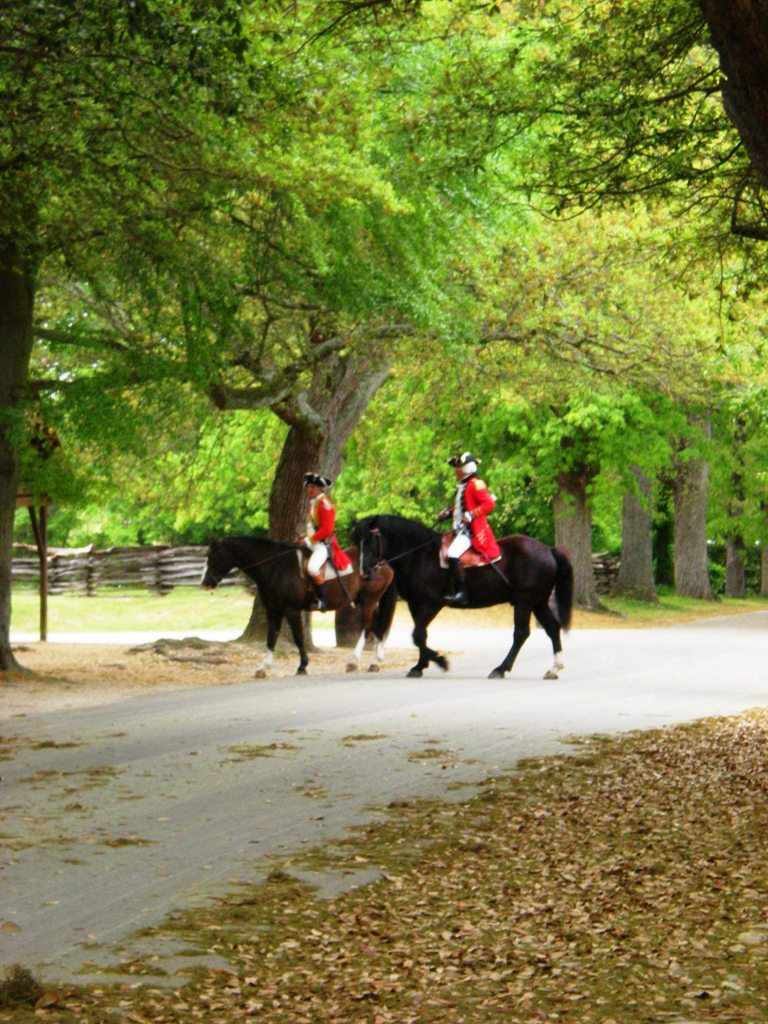
- American Legion reenactors at Colonial Williamsburg
- Active: 1780–1783
- Disbanded: 24 October 1783
- Country: Great Britain
- Allegiance: New York
- Branch: British Army
- Type: Provincial Troops
- Role: Cavalry and infantry
- Size: Corps (regiment)
- Part of: British American Forces
- Facings: Green
- Engagements: American War of Independence: Raid on Richmond; Battle of Blandford; Battle of Groton Heights

Commanders
- Commanding Officer: Brigadier General Benedict Arnold

The American Legion was a provincial cavalry and infantry corps (regiment) of the British Army in the American War of Independence commanded by Brigadier General Benedict Arnold.

== History ==
The American Legion is notable for the fact that Brigadier General Benedict Arnold, who had previously served the United States and had defected to the British in 1780, was the commanding officer. It was organised in October 1780 at New York. The Legion accompanied Arnold in his raid upon Virginia. It was with him in his expedition into Connecticut in September 1781, in which two forts were stormed and dismantled, and the town of New London plundered and burned. The Legion was disbanded on 24 October 1783 in New Brunswick.

== Uniform ==
The Legion's uniform consisted of a red coat with green facings. The coat had short tails, as opposed to those worn by British Regulars who wore long tails.

== See also ==
- Military career of Benedict Arnold, 1781
