= Sarah J. Purcell =

American historian

Sarah Purcell is an American historian. She is the L.F. Parker Professor of History at Grinnell College in Grinnell, Iowa.

Purcell did a history BA at Grinnell College in 1992, and an AM and PhD at Brown University, in 1993 and 1997 respectively. She taught at Central Michigan University until 2000, when she went to Grinnell. She has specialised in American history, particularly Civil War and military topics.

== Books ==
- Sealed with Blood: War, Sacrifice, and Memory in Revolutionary America
- Eyewitness History: The Early American Republic.
- The Encyclopedia of Battles in North America, 1517-1915 (Best of Reference award winner, New York Public Library, 2000)
- Critical Lives: The Life and Work of Eleanor Roosevelt.
- Spectacle of Grief: The Politics of Mourning and the U.S. Civil War.
