= Battle of Blandford =

Battle of the American Revolutionary War

Coordinates: 37.23438°N 77.3939°W

Battle of Blandford (Petersburg)
- Part of the American War of Independence
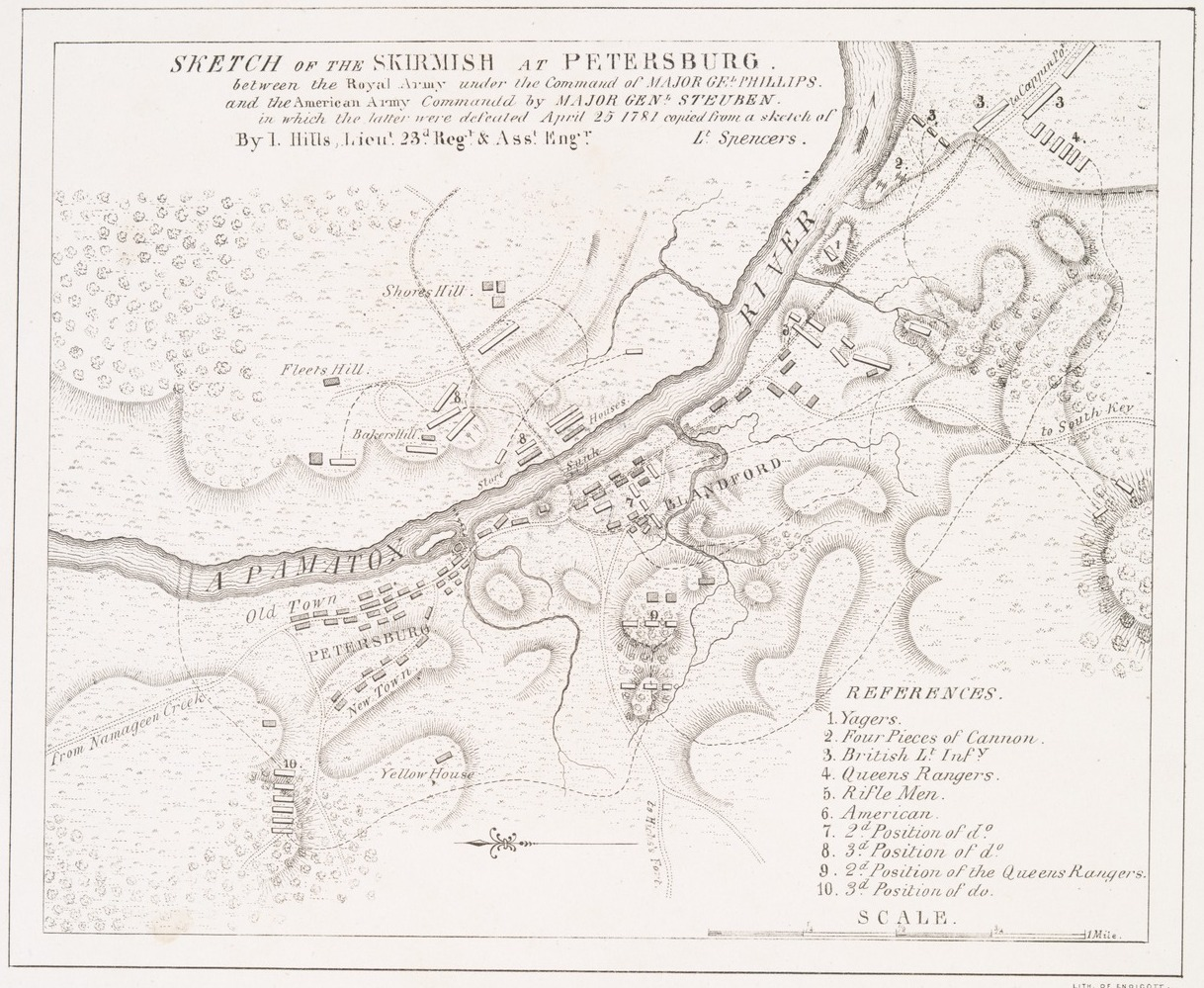
- A British engineer's sketch of the battle
Date	25 April 1781
Location	Blandford, now a part of Petersburg, Virginia
Result	British victory

Belligerents
United States	Great Britain

Commanders and leaders
Baron von Steuben; Peter Muhlenberg	William Phillips; Benedict Arnold

Strength
1,000	2,500

Casualties and losses
Over 150	25–30
- Virginia

The Battle of Blandford (or Blanford), also called the Battle of Petersburg, took place near Petersburg, Virginia on 25 April 1781, late in the American War of Independence. Roughly 2,300 British regulars under the command of Brigadier General William Phillips defeated about 1,000 American militia under Major General Baron von Steuben.

The introduction of a British troop presence led by turncoat general Benedict Arnold into Virginia in early 1781 prompted an increase in American militia activity to counter the British force. The militia were, however, poorly trained and equipped, and were unable to prevent Arnold from moving freely. Arnold was reinforced in March 1781 by additional troops led by General Phillips, who targeted Petersburg in a raiding expedition. Militia troops led by von Steuben and Peter Muhlenberg decided to make a stand at Blandford, then a separate community.

When the battle was joined, the outnumbered American militiamen provided remarkably stiff resistance to the British advance, and executed a disciplined retreat across the Appomattox River, avoiding a flanking attempt led by John Graves Simcoe. They eventually retreated to Richmond, where they joined forces with Continental Army troops led by the Marquis de Lafayette. Philips and Arnold continued to launch raids, and eventually joined forces with Charles Cornwallis's army from North Carolina.

== Background ==
By December 1780, the American Revolutionary War's North American main theaters had reached a critical point. The Continental Army had suffered major defeats earlier in the year, with its southern armies either captured or dispersed in the loss of Charleston and the Battle of Camden in the south, while the armies of George Washington and the British commander-in-chief for North America, Sir Henry Clinton watched each other around New York City in the north. The national currency was virtually worthless, public support for the war, about to enter its sixth year, was waning, and army troops were becoming mutinous over pay and conditions. In the Americans' favor, Loyalist recruiting had been checked with a severe blow at Kings Mountain in October.

To counter the British threat in the south, Washington sent Major General Nathanael Greene, one of his best strategists, to rebuild the American army in North Carolina after the defeat at Camden. Charles Cornwallis, leading the British troops in the south, wanted to deal with him and gain control over the state.

=== Arnold sent to Virginia ===
At Cornwallis's request for a diversion in Virginia to draw attention and resources from Greene, General Clinton in December 1780 dispatched Brigadier General Benedict Arnold (who had changed sides the previous September) with 1,600 men to Virginia. Arnold's instructions were to destroy Continental Army supplies and storage depots in that state, which had largely avoided military conflict before 1780, and then to establish a base for future operations at Portsmouth. On the afternoon of 4 January, Arnold sailed up the James River and landed his force at Westover, Virginia. Moving rapidly with an overnight forced march, he raided Richmond, the state capital, the next day. After another day of raiding, he returned to his boats and sailed to Portsmouth, which he then proceeded to fortify. The land approaches to this base were guarded by Virginia militia under the command of Brigadier General Peter Muhlenberg, but these were inexperienced as well as relatively small in number, and could not prevent the movement of British troops by ship on the readily navigable rivers in the area.

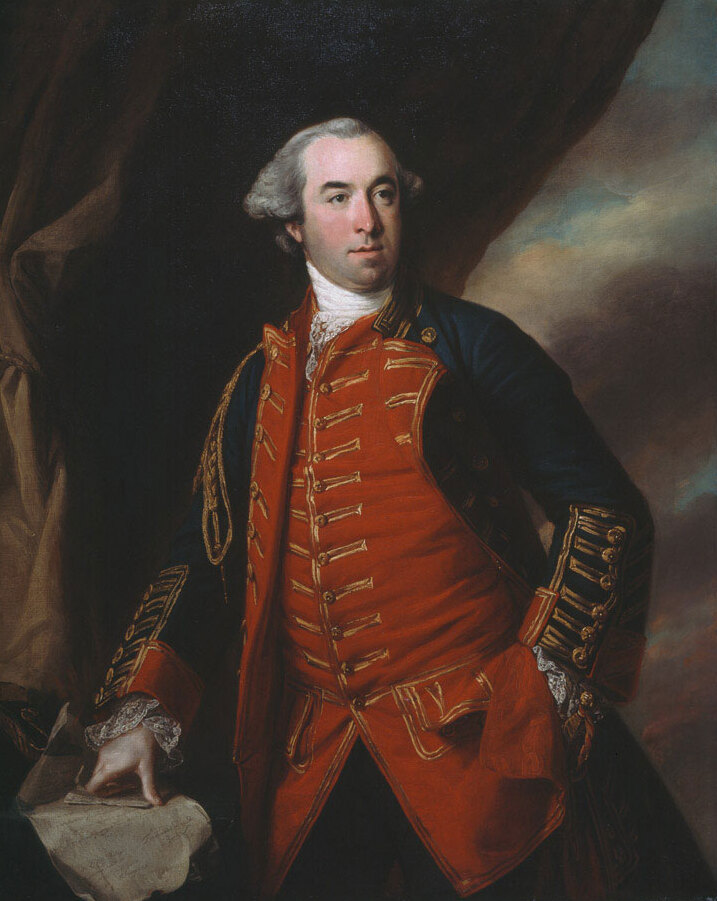
Brigadier General William Phillips

Arnold's arrival prompted General Washington to mobilize land and naval forces to challenge him. Washington sent the Marquis de Lafayette with a Continental Army detachment to Virginia in February, and asked the French admiral at Newport, Rhode Island, Charles René Dominique Sochet, Chevalier Destouches, to send a naval force with addition troops to support Lafayette. When a storm in late January caused damage to the Royal Navy fleet watching Newport, Destouches slipped a ship of the line and two frigates out of Newport while Lafayette marched south. When these arrived near Portsmouth, Arnold withdrew his ships, which were lighter vessels with shallow drafts, up the Elizabeth River, and the French fleet, with its deeper drafts, was unable to follow. The French returned to Newport, but the effort, and further urging by Washington, prompted Destouches to sally out of Newport on 8 March with his entire fleet, seven ships of the line and a recently captured frigate, with 1,200 French troops aboard. When Clinton and Admiral Marriot Arbuthnot learned of this two days later, they immediately mobilized supporting resources. Arbuthnot sailed with eight ships of the line that very day, and, in naval action on 16 March, successfully prevented Destouches from entering Chesapeake Bay. Arbuthnot's fleet was followed by transports carrying 2,000 British Army troops under the command of General William Phillips. When Phillips and his troops were landed at Portsmouth on 26 March, Phillips, with seniority over Arnold, took command of the forces there.

=== Raiding by Phillips ===
Phillips then advanced again against the largely undefended countryside. A militia force under Major General Baron von Steuben tried to check their progress and protect Richmond and Petersburg. Von Steuben could discern that, though the British might attack Richmond as before, they definitely considered Petersburg a prime objective, since it served as a military depot for both state and Continental forces. By 23 April, the British force had sailed up the James River to Westover; it landed there to drive off about 500 militia, and reports to von Steuben claimed the force to number between 2,500 and 3,000.

On 24 April, as the afternoon progressed, about 1,000 of General Muhlenberg's Virginia militia marched into Petersburg. Other militia units were also gathering. Lafayette's force was still several days away, and another Continental Army force under General Anthony Wayne was even further off. Von Steuben and Muhlenberg, who had been avoiding conflict with the British due to their weak numbers and inexperienced troops, decided that it was time to make some sort of stand. The militia had not had any sort of victory since the British arrived in Virginia, and morale was quite low. After a council of war, they decided to establish a line in Blandford, then a separate town east of Petersburg and now a neighborhood within the city. When the time came, the colonists could retreat across the Appomattox River over the Pocahontas Bridge. That evening General von Steuben ordered Muhlenberg's corps to the north side of the Appomattox onto the peninsula known as Pocahontas Island and onto the elevated ground overlooking the river. Then, during the moonless night, von Steuben and Muhlenberg moved their forces south of the river into Blandford.

== Battle ==
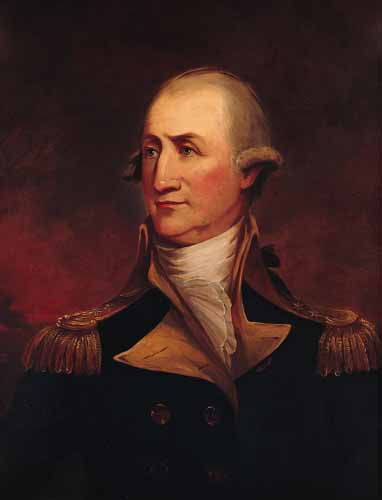
General Peter Muhlenberg, by an unknown 19th century artist

Shortly before sunset on 24 April, Phillips landed a force of 2,500 British and Hessian soldiers at City Point (now Hopewell), 12 miles (19 km) east of Petersburg. As morning dawned the next day, four regiments of Muhlenberg's Virginia militia infantry formed two lines of defense and awaited the British force. The first line was composed of the regiments of Thomas Merriweather and John Dick, with Merriweather's anchoring the left of the line at the river, and Dick's the right, extending into the hills south of Blandford. The second line, which was to form the main line of defense after the first one fell back, consisted of Ralph Faulkner's regiment on the left, and John Slaughter's on the right. The line extended along what is today Madison Street in Petersburg, from a causeway and bridge across the Lieutenant Run, a creek separating Petersburg and Blandford. The line was positioned to maximize the exposure of British troops to gunfire as they approached. Von Steuben also placed one regiment on the north shore of the Appomattox River to guard against the possibility that the British landed on that side of the river. He also positioned a small reserve force at the southern end of the Pocahontas Bridge, and Muhlenberg sent a company of Slaughter's men down the north bank to provide advance warning as the British approached.

The British set out around 10 that morning, marching along the River Road toward Petersburg. Phillips' command consisted of the 78th and 80th Regiments of Foot, John Graves Simcoe's corps of Loyalist Queen's Rangers, Arnold's American Legion, a force of Hessian jägers, and two battalions of light infantry. Phillips had originally planned a circuitous route in order to go after military stores at the Prince George County courthouse, but reconnaissance reported these had already been removed by the Americans, so Phillips marched directly for Petersburg. Eleven lightly armed gunboats accompanied the force up the Appomattox, carrying men and supplies.

The battle was preceded by an exchange of fire between the British gunboats and the American advance reconnaissance. Around 2:00 pm Phillips halted his column, then about one mile (1.6 km) from the American lines, and organized his forces for battle. On his right, Colonel Robert Abercrombie was to lead a battalion of light infantry and the company of 50 jägers along the river to drive the American left back to the Pocahontas Bridge. Lieutenant Colonel Thomas Dundas was to lead the 78th and 80th Foot to attempt a flanking maneuver against the American right, and Phillips held the second light infantry battalion and the Loyalist units of Simcoe and Arnold in reserve. He also held in reserve the four small guns the expedition had brought.

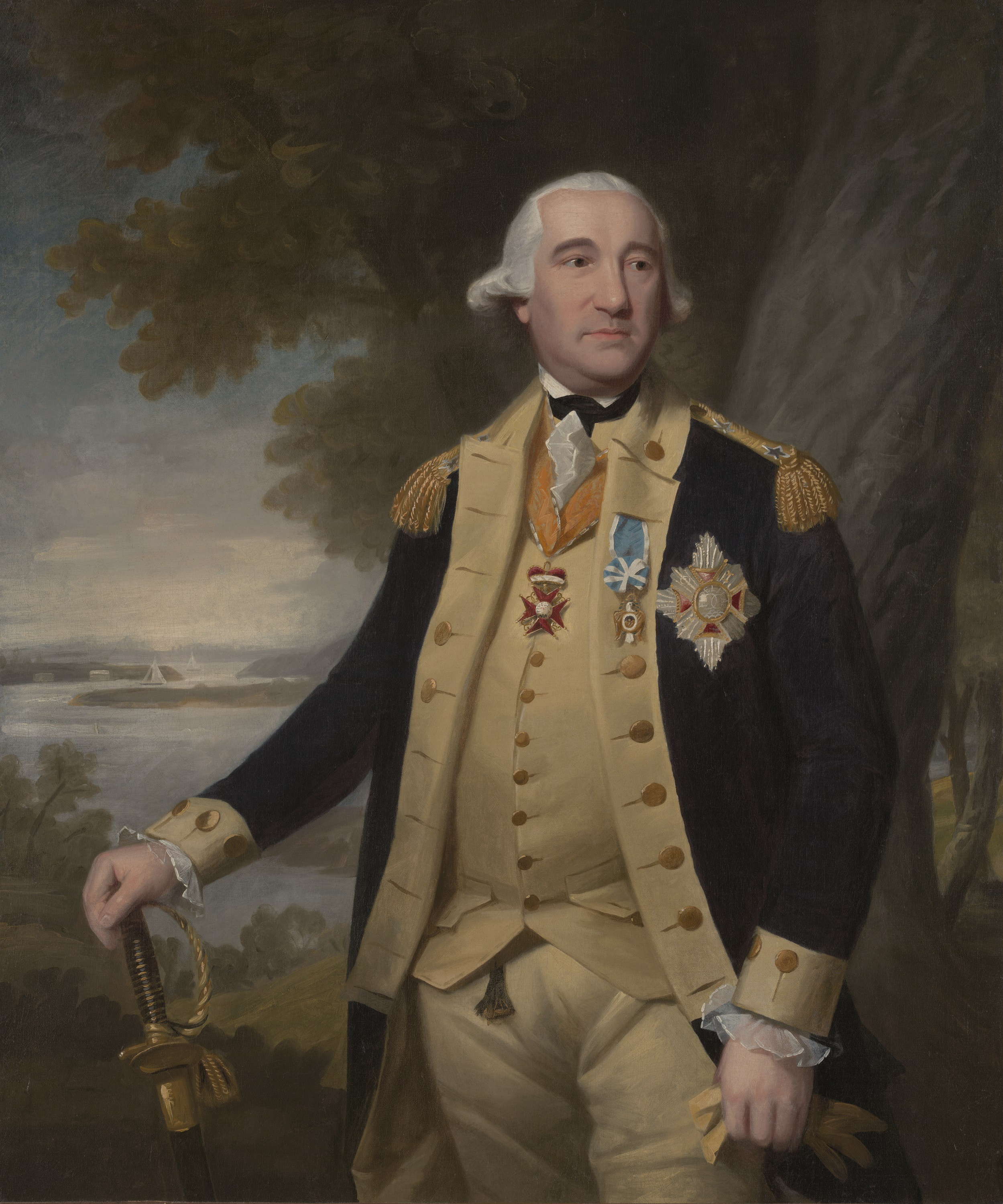
General Baron von Steuben, painting by Ralph Earl

As the British forces advanced on the American line, Phillips and Abercrombie noticed that one enterprising company of Virginia militia had established a position on a hill that provided them with an excellent opportunity to enfilade the British line. Abercrombie sent the jägers to flush them out. The lines then closed, and the action became general. The first line of militia put up stiffer resistance than the British anticipated. The British artillery, and the strength of numbers that threatened to flank their position convinced the first militia line to retreat to the second after half an hour of resistance. Phillips also detached Simcoe and his rangers on a lengthy and roundabout flanking maneuver intended to prevent the Americans from retreating across the Pocahontas Bridge. While Simcoe moved, Phillips made two assaults on the second militia line, both of which were repulsed. It was not until the British artillery was in position to rake the American line more than an hour later that von Steuben finally ordered the retreat. The Americans were eventually able to make an orderly retreat across the bridge, covered by the men placed on the high ground above the far side of the bridge. The last companies across took up the bridge planking as they went, in order to delay pursuit (an act which later earned them the praise of contemporaries such as Thomas Jefferson, General Nathanael Greene, and others).

Pausing on the heights near Violet Bank (in present-day Colonial Heights), the Americans engaged in an artillery duel with the British forces on the opposite bank, with further losses on both sides. After being replenished with a supply of rum, the weary militia then continued its northward retreat, reaching Chesterfield Courthouse the following day—just as the British force was crossing the Appomattox, destroying three more bridges behind them.

== Aftermath ==
Phillips' and Arnold's pursuit of the retreating American militia continued to Manchester, just across the river from Richmond, which they reached on 29 April. However, they were unable to enter Richmond, as Lafayette had marched rapidly and occupied the city first. After destroying tobacco warehouses throughout Chesterfield County, the British sailed back down the James to Westover, while Lafayette advanced as far as Pocahontas. At Westover on 7 May, Phillips received orders to return to Petersburg and await Lord Cornwallis, who was moving north from Wilmington, North Carolina. Upon reaching Petersburg on 9 May, Phillips was greeted by a bombardment from Lafayette's artillery positioned north of the river in what is now Colonial Heights. General Phillips contracted typhoid fever and died on 13 May, leaving Arnold temporarily in command of the British force.

Cornwallis reached Petersburg on 20 May, bringing the British force up to 5,300 men. Shortly after, additional British reinforcements arrived from New York, raising his force to over 7,000 men. Cornwallis ordered Arnold back to New York, and then fruitlessly chased Lafayette for a time through central Virginia before making his way back to Williamsburg. Cornwallis was eventually ordered to fortify Yorktown, where Lafayette, joined early in September by a French force from the West Indies, blockaded the land routes while the French fleet prevented the arrival of British relief fleets. With the arrival of George Washington and the Franco-American army from the north, Cornwallis was besieged, and surrendered his army on 17 October 1781.

Petersburg was once again a center of military activity during the American Civil War, when it was besieged for nine months in 1864 and 1865. The role of Petersburg in this later conflict dominates commemorations of its military history. However, since 1992, the city of Petersburg has sponsored an annual reenactment of this battle.
