= William Phillips (British Army officer) =

British Army officer

Major-General William Phillips
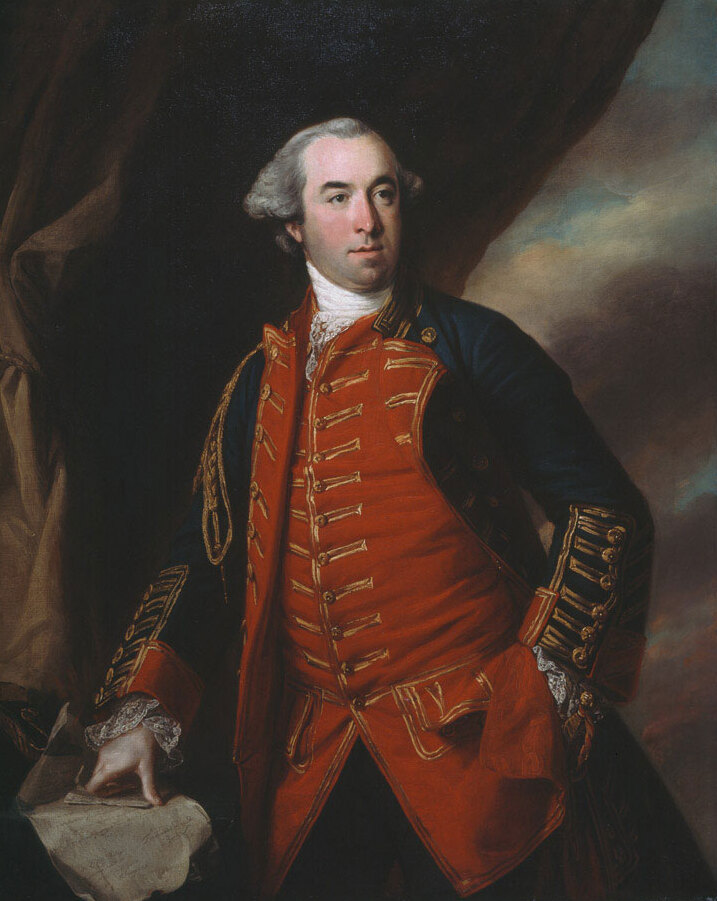
- Portrait by Francis Cotes, c. 1764
- Born: 1731; England
- Died: 13 May 1781 (aged 49–50); Petersburg, Virginia
- Military career
- Allegiance: Great Britain
- Branch: British Army
- Service years: 1747–1781
- Rank: Major-General
- Units: Royal Artillery
- Conflicts: Seven Years' War; Battle of Minden; American War of Independence; Saratoga Campaign; Battle of Blandford

Major-General William Phillips (c. 1731 – 13 May 1781) was a British Army officer who served in the Royal Artillery during the American War of Independence.

== Early career ==
Phillips entered the academy at Woolwich and eventually joined the Royal Artillery. His service at the Battle of Minden led to a reputation as an excellent officer. By the outbreak of the American War of Independence he had risen to the rank of colonel in the British Army. He served as the Commander of Artillery at Woolwich and Lieutenant Governor of Windsor Castle, and was eventually elected as MP for Boroughbridge.

== American War of Independence ==
Phillips was promoted to the rank of Major-General and sent to Quebec in 1776, along with his friends General Henry Clinton and General John Burgoyne, to be the commander of all artillery in the province. Governor Sir Guy Carleton put him in charge of the shipyard at St. John's where, along with Captain Sir Charles Douglas, he supervised the building of the small fleet of ships that fought the Americans under Benedict Arnold at the Battle of Valcour Island. He later took part in the recapture of Fort Ticonderoga, where he stated, "Where a goat can go, a man can go. And where a man can go, he can drag a gun."

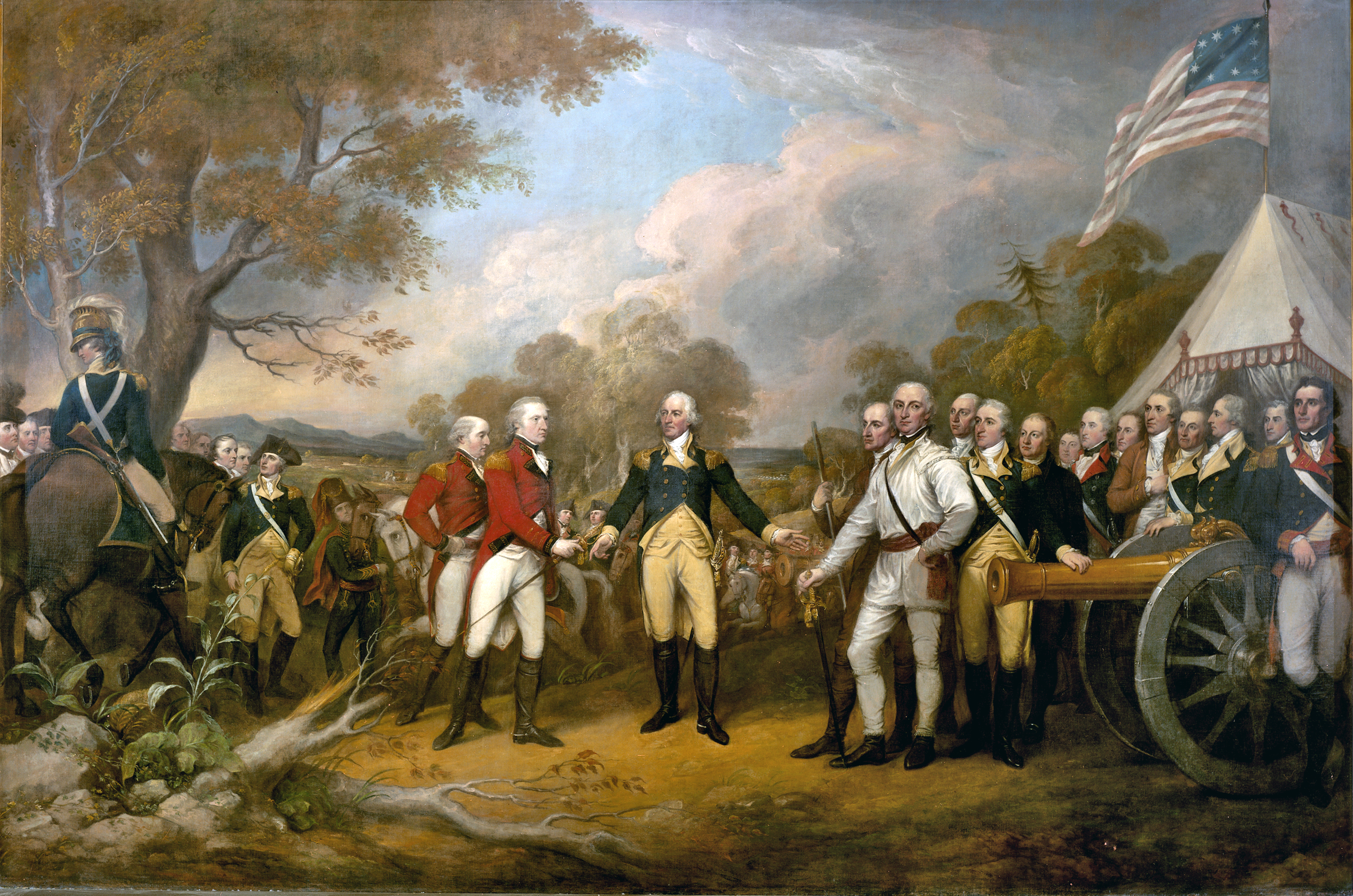
Surrender of General Burgoyne Phillips stands just behind Burgoyne, left of center

As part of Burgoyne's army, he was captured at Saratoga in 1777. He is depicted in the painting of the Surrender of General Burgoyne by John Trumbull. He was then a part of the Convention Army until he was exchanged for American General Benjamin Lincoln in 1780. While a prisoner in Virginia, he was one of the British officers who was entertained at the home of Thomas Jefferson. After the exchange he was able to fight once again, and was sent by Clinton from New York to meet up with Brigadier General Benedict Arnold (who was now on the British side) in Virginia.

While on his way to link up with General Cornwallis, he contracted either typhus or malaria, and became so ill that Arnold had to lead his men. He died on 13 May 1781 at Petersburg, Virginia, five months before Yorktown, and is buried there near Blandford Church.

As he lay gravely ill, in the home belonging to the Bolling family known as Bollingbrook, British forces in Petersburg were being shelled by the Marquis de Lafayette's cannons positioned in the heights north of the river, today known as Colonial Heights, Virginia. His final words — uttered after a shell struck the home and killed an African-American servant named Molly — are reputed to have been "Won't that boy let me die in peace?" He and Molly were said to have been buried together, to prevent identification. Thomas Jefferson described him as "the proudest man of the proudest nation on earth".

== Footnotes ==
Parliament of Great Britain
| Preceded by Charles Mellish; Anthony Eyre | Member of Parliament for Boroughbridge; 1775–1780; With: Anthony Eyre | Succeeded by Anthony Eyre; Charles Ambler |
