= American Revolutionary War =

1775–1783 conflict in North America

- Part of the American Revolution, the Anglo-French War (1778–1783), the Anglo-Spanish War (1779–1783), and the Fourth Anglo-Dutch War
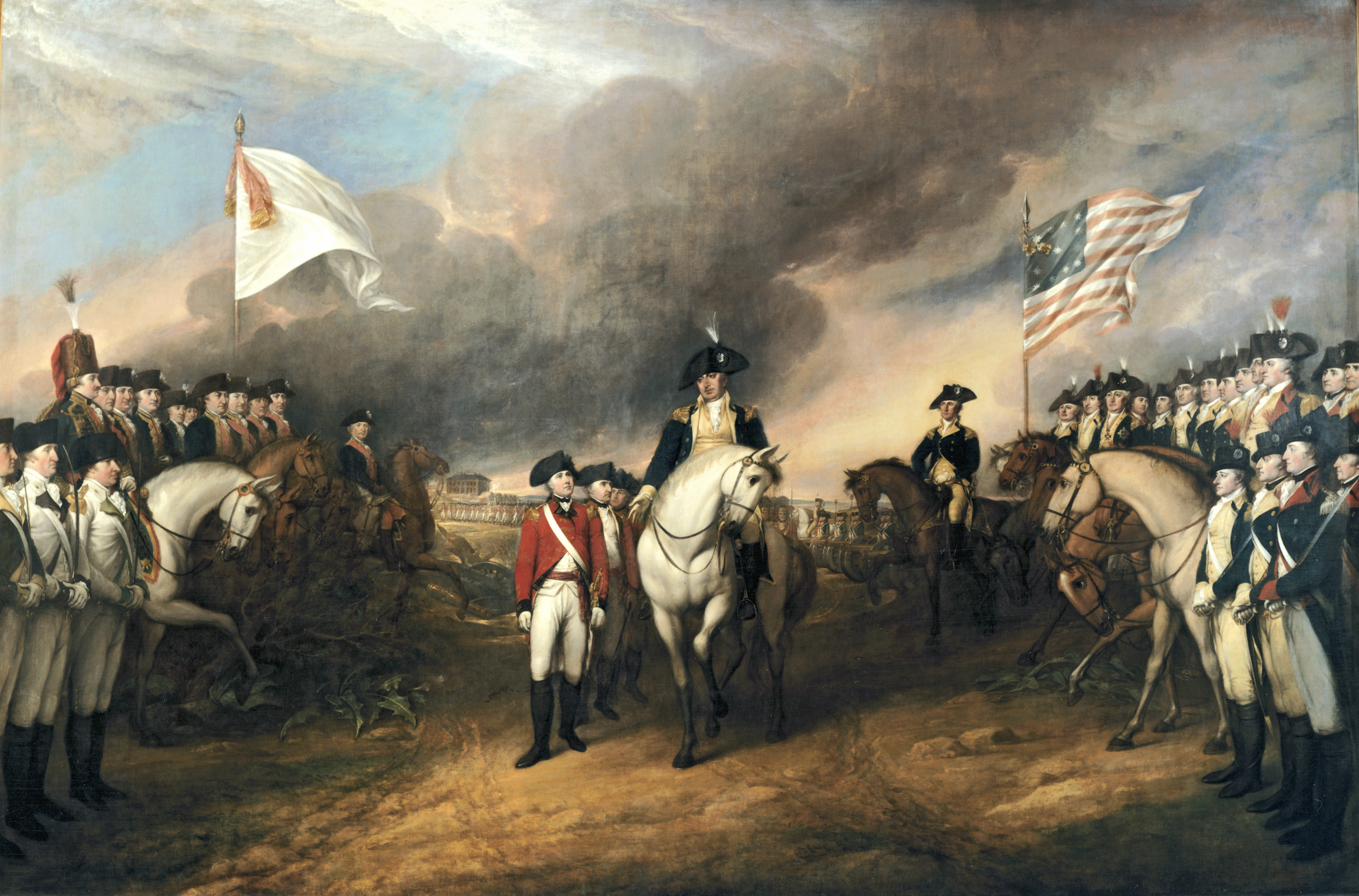
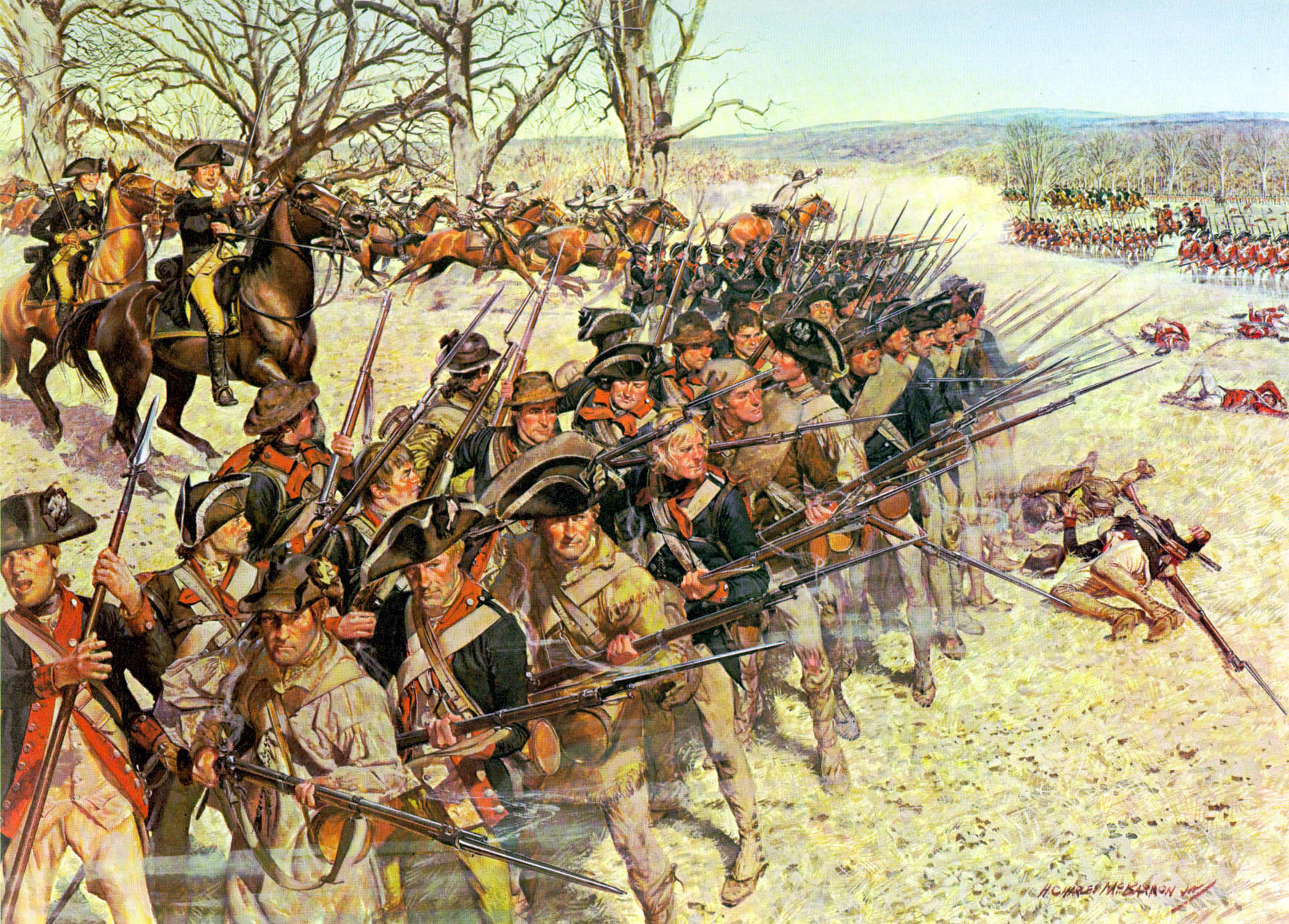
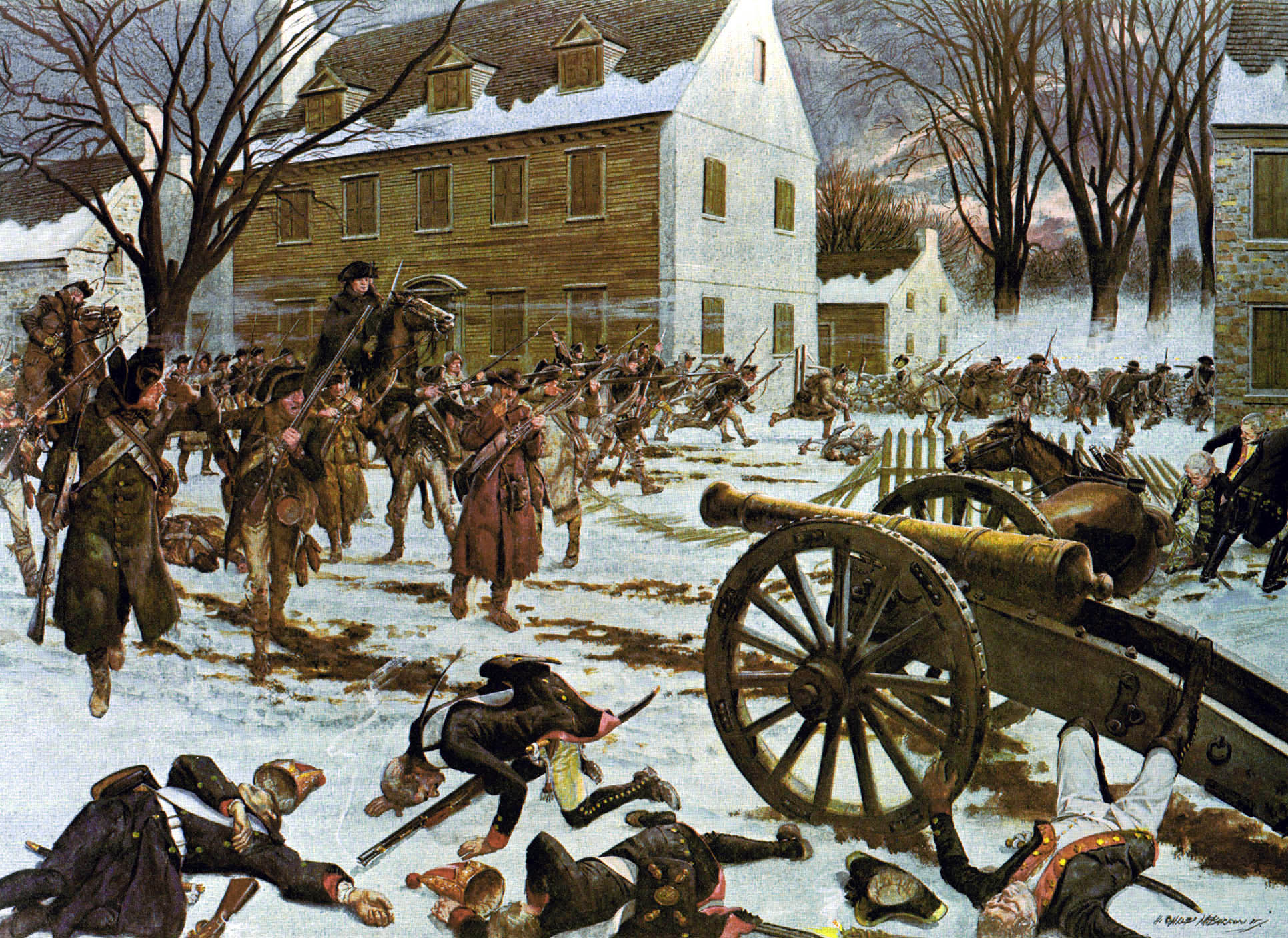
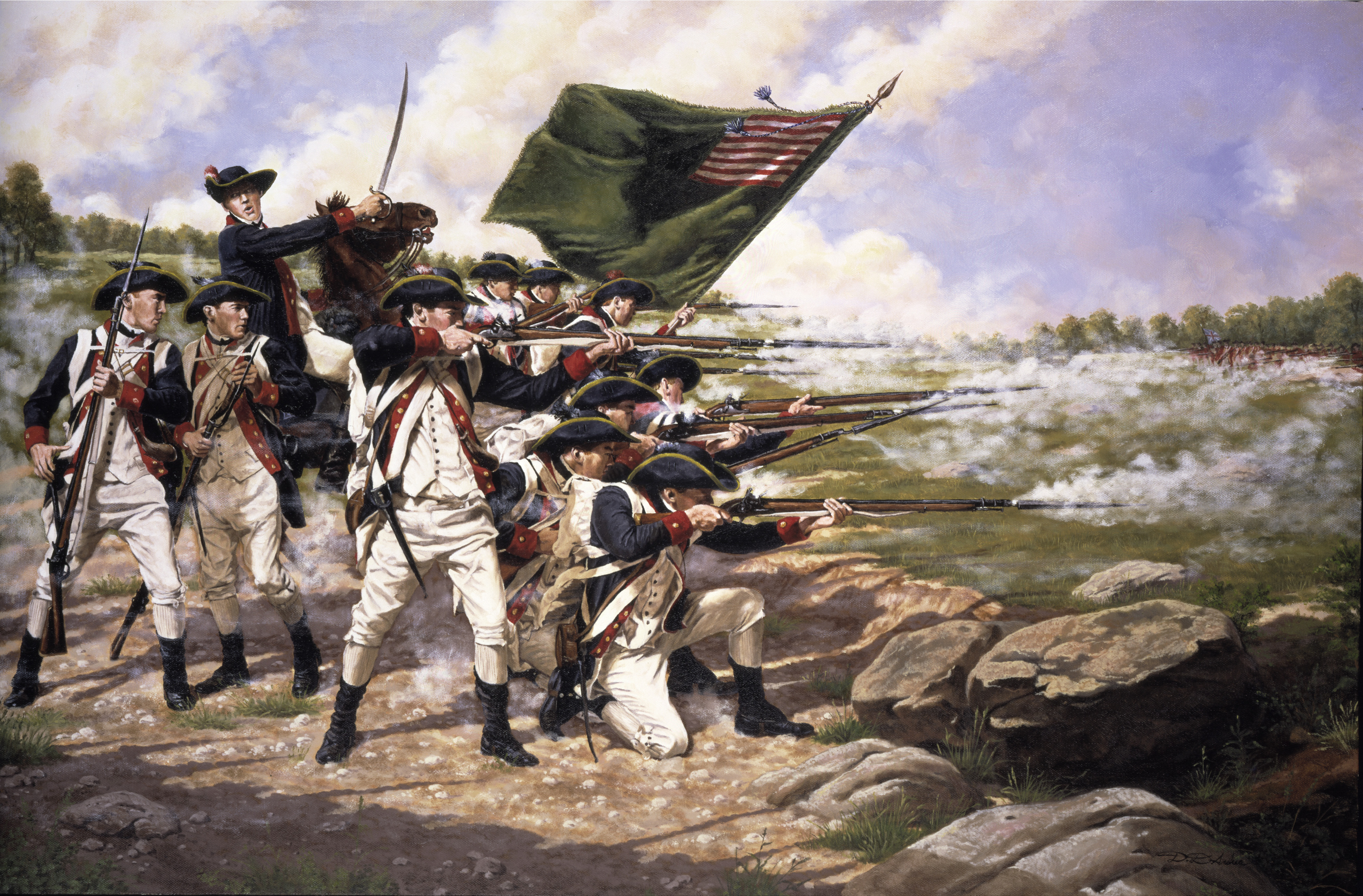
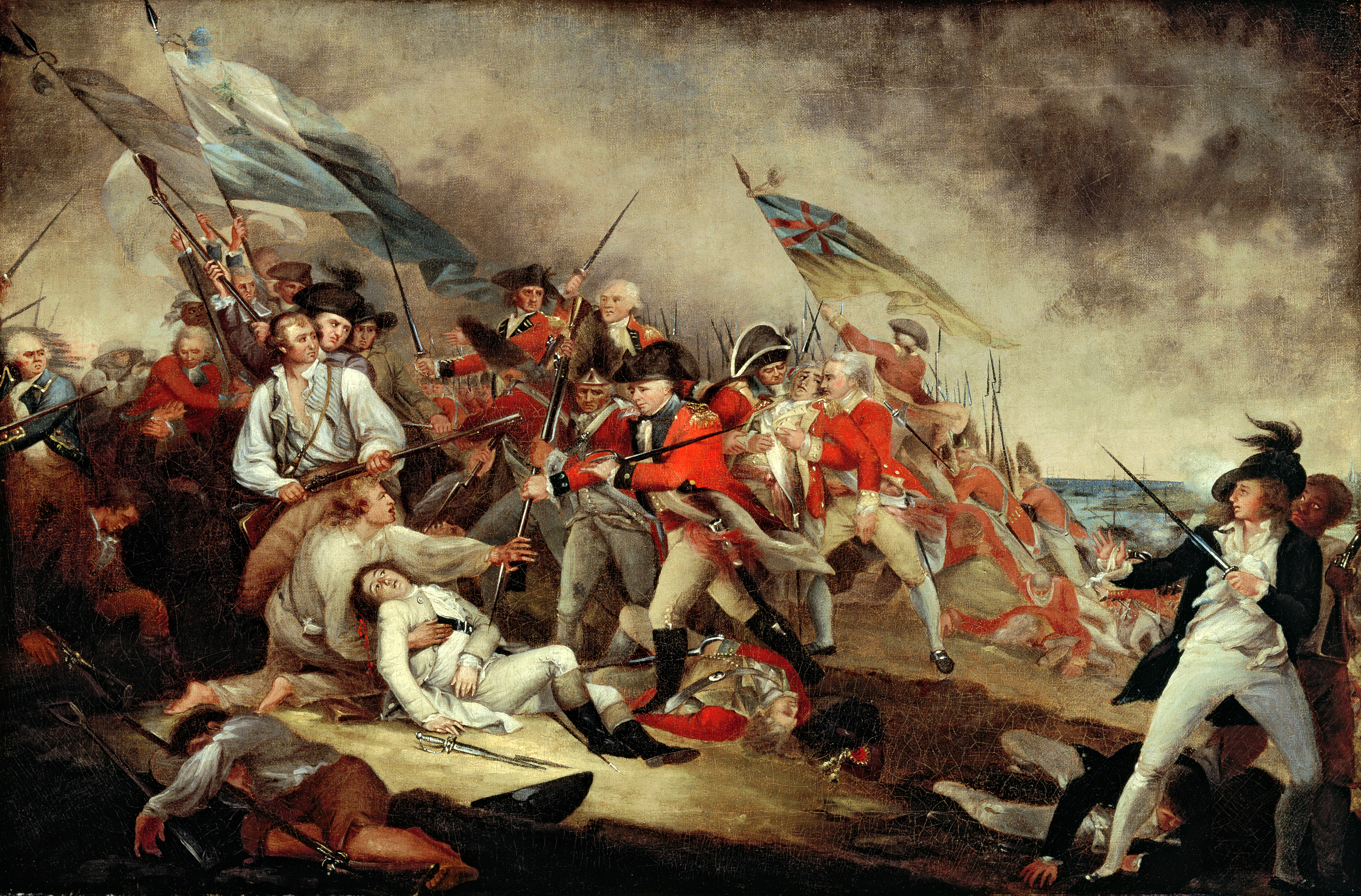
- Clockwise from top left: Surrender of Lord Cornwallis after the siege of Yorktown, Battle of Trenton, The Death of General Warren at the Battle of Bunker Hill, Battle of Long Island, and the Battle of Guilford Court House
Date	April 19, 1775 – September 3, 1783 (Note: A cease-fire in North America was proclaimed by Congress on April 11, 1783, under a cease-fire agreement between Great Britain and France on January 20, 1783. The final peace treaty was signed on September 3, 1783, and ratified on January 14, 1784, in the US, with final ratification exchanged in Europe on May 12, 1784. Hostilities in India continued until July 1783.) (8 years, 4 months and 15 days); Ratification effective: May 12, 1784
Location	Eastern North America, North Atlantic Ocean, the Caribbean and Europe
Result	American Patriot and allied victory: Signing of the United States Declaration of Independence in 1776.; Great Britain would not recognize American independence until signing of the Treaty of Paris.; Peace of Paris; End of the First British Empire, formation of the Second British Empire
Territorial changes	Great Britain cedes generally, all mainland territories east of the Mississippi River, south of the Great Lakes, and north of the Floridas to the newly independent United States.: Great Britain cedes Tobago and Senegal to France.; Great Britain cedes Minorca, West Florida, and East Florida to Spain.

Belligerents
Patriots: Thirteen/United Colonies (1775–1776): United States (from 1776) (Note: Including the United Colonies period from 1776 to 1781 and the Confederation period from 1781 to 1783.) (Note: The states involved in the Revolutionary War included New Hampshire, Massachusetts, Rhode Island, Connecticut, New York, New Jersey, Pennsylvania, Delaware, Maryland, Virginia, North Carolina, South Carolina, and Georgia) Vermont Republic France Spain Dutch Republic	Great Britain: (Kingdom of Great Britain) Loyalist colonial governments and military forces; (Kingdom of Great Britain) Quebec; Nova Scotia; West Florida; East Florida; (Province of Hanover) Hanover
Co-belligerents: British Canadien Congressional regiments (Note: Two independent "COR" Regiments, the Congress's Own Regiments, were recruited among British Canadiens. The 1st Canadian Regiment formed by James Livingston of Chambly, Quebec; and the 2nd Canadian Regiment formed by Moses Hazen of Saint-Jean-sur-Richelieu, Quebec.); British Canadien militia (French led) (Note: Augustin de La Balme independently marched on Detroit under a French flag with British Canadien militia recruited from western Quebec (Illinois County, Virginia) at the county seat of Kaskaskia, Cahokia, and Vincennes.); American Indian tribes: Oneida; Tuscarora; Catawba; Lenape; Chickasaw; Choctaw; Mohican; Mi'kmaq (Note: (until 1779)); Abenaki; Pedee; Lumbee	Co-belligerents: Hesse (Note: Sixty-five percent of Britain's German auxiliaries employed in North America were from Hesse-Kassel (16,000) and Hesse-Hanau (2,422), flying this same flag.); (Duchy of Brunswick) Brunswick (Note: Twenty percent of Britain's German auxiliaries employed in North America were from Brunswick-Wolfenbüttel (5,723), flying this flag.); German mercenaries/auxiliaries (Note: The British hired over 30,000 professional soldiers from various German states who served in North America from 1775 to 1782. Commentators and historians often refer to them as mercenaries or auxiliaries, terms that are sometimes used interchangeably.); Hesse-Kassel; Hesse-Hanau; Waldeck; Ansbach-Bayreuth; Anhalt-Zerbst; Hanover American Indian tribes; Onondaga; Mohawk; Cayuga; Seneca; Mi'kmaq (Note: (from 1779)); Cherokee; Odawa; Muscogee; Susquehannock; Shawnee

Commanders and leaders
Peyton Randolph; John Hancock; Benjamin Franklin; George Washington; Horatio Gates; Nathanael Greene; Henry Knox; John Sullivan; Benedict Arnold (Note: Arnold served on the American side from 1775 to 1780; after defecting, he served on the British side from 1780 to 1783.); George Rogers Clark; Lafayette; Rochambeau; Bernardo de Gálvez; full list...	George III; (Kingdom of Great Britain) Lord North; (Kingdom of Great Britain) Lord Shelburne; (Kingdom of Great Britain) Lord George Germain; Thomas Gage; William Howe; Henry Clinton; John Burgoyne (surrendered); Charles Cornwallis (surrendered); Benedict Arnold; Henry Hamilton (surrendered); Banastre Tarleton (surrendered); full list...

Strength
United States: Army and militia: 40,000 (average) (Note: The total in active duty service for the American Cause during the American Revolutionary War numbered 200,000.); Navy: 53 frigates and sloops (Note: 5,000 sailors (peak), manning privateers, an additional 55,000 total sailors); Marines: 2,131 (peak); State navies: 106 ships (total); France: 40,000 in North America (Note: In 1780, General Rochambeau landed in Rhode Island with an independent command of about 6000 troops, and in 1781 Admiral de Grasse landed nearly 4000 troops who were detached to Lafayette's Continental Army surrounding British General Cornwallis in Virginia at Yorktown. An additional 750 French troops participated with the Spanish assault on Pensacola.) (Note: For five months in 1778 from July to November, the French deployed a fleet to assist American operations off of New York, Rhode Island and Savannah commanded by Admiral d'Estaing, with little result. In September 1781, Admiral de Grasse left the West Indies to defeat the British fleet off Virginia at the Battle of the Chesapeake, then offloaded 3,000 troops and siege cannon to support Washington's siege of Yorktown.); 100,000 worldwide; Spain: Army: 12,000 (Note: Governor Bernardo de Gálvez deployed 500 Spanish regulars in his New Orleans-based attacks on British-held locations west of the Mississippi River in Spanish Luisiana. In later engagements, Galvez had 800 regulars from New Orleans to assault Mobile, reinforced by infantry from regiments of Jose de Ezpeleta from Havana. In the assault on Pensacola, the Spanish Army contingents from Havana exceeded 9,000. For the final days of the siege at Pensacola siege, Admiral Jose Solano's fleet landed 1,600 crack infantry veterans from that of Gibraltar.); Navy: 1 fleet; (Note: Admiral Jose Solano's fleet arrived from the Mediterranean Sea to support the Spanish conquest of English Pensacola, West Florida.) escorts; American Indians: Unknown	Great Britain: Army: 48,000 (average) in North America (Note: British 121,000 (global 1781) "Of 7,500 men in the Gibraltar garrison in September (including 400 in hospital), some 3,430 were always on duty".); Navy: Task-force fleets & blockading squadrons (Note: Royal Navy 94 ships-of-the-line global, 104 frigates global, 37 sloops global, 171,000 sailors); Loyalist troops: 25,000 (total) (Note: Contains a detailed listing of American, French, British, German, and Loyalist regiments; indicates when they were raised, the main battles, and what happened to them. Also includes the main warships on both sides, and all the important battles.); German troops: 29,875 (total); American Indians: 13,000

Casualties and losses
United States: 25,000 total military dead; 6,800 killed in action; 6,100–8,500 wounded; 17,000 dead from disease; 11,500 captured (excluding POWs who died in captivity); France: 2,112 killed–East Coast (Note: Beyond the 2112 deaths recorded by the French Government fighting for US independence, additional men died fighting Britain in a war waged by France, Spain, and the Dutch Republic from 1778 to 1784, "overseas" from the American Revolution as posited by a British scholar in his "War of the American Revolution".); Spain: 371 killed–W. Florida; American Indians: Unknown	Great Britain: 43,633 total military dead (excluding auxiliaries and provincial troops) 8,500 killed (Note: Clodfelter reports that the battle deaths among the British and their allies numbered 15,000 killed in battle or died of wounds. These included estimates of 3,000 Germans, 3,000 Loyalists and Canadians, 3,000 lost at sea, and 500 Native Americans killed in battle or died of wounds.) 17,500+ captured; Germans: 7,774 total dead; 1,800 killed; 4,888 deserted; Loyalists: 7,000 total dead; 1,700 killed; 5,300 dead from disease; American Indians: 500 killed

The American Revolutionary War (April 19, 1775 – September 3, 1783), also known as the Revolutionary War or American War of Independence or simply the American Revolution, was the armed conflict that comprised the final eight years of the broader American Revolution, in which American Patriot forces organized as the Continental Army and, commanded by George Washington, defeated the British Army. The conflict was fought in North America, the Caribbean, and the Atlantic Ocean. The war's outcome seemed uncertain for most of the war, but Washington and the Continental Army's decisive victory in the Siege of Yorktown in 1781 led King George III and the Kingdom of Great Britain to negotiate an end to the war. In 1783, in the Treaty of Paris, the British Crown acknowledged the independence of the Thirteen Colonies, leading to the establishment of the United States as an independent and sovereign nation.

In 1763, after the British Empire gained dominance in North America following its victory over the French Colonial Empire during the Seven Years' War, tensions and disputes began escalating between the British and their Thirteen Colonies, especially following passage of the Stamp and Townshend Acts. The British Army responded by seeking to occupy Boston militarily, leading to the Boston Massacre on March 5, 1770. In mid-1774, with tensions escalating even further between the British Army and the Thirteen Colonies, the British Parliament had imposed the Intolerable Acts, an attempt to disarm British-American colonists, leading to the Battles of Lexington and Concord in April 1775, the first battles of the Revolutionary War. In June 1775, the Second Continental Congress voted to incorporate colonial-based Patriot militias into a central military, the Continental Army, and unanimously appointed Washington its commander-in-chief. Two months later, in August 1775, king George III declared the colonies to be in a state of rebellion. In July 1776, the Second Continental Congress formalized the war, passing the Lee Resolution on July 2, and, two days later, unanimously adopting the Declaration of Independence, on July 4.

In March 1776, in an early win for the newly-formed Continental Army under Washington's command, following a successful siege of Boston, the Continental Army successfully drove the British Army out of Boston. British commander in chief William Howe responded by launching the New York and New Jersey campaign, which resulted in Howe's capture of New York City in November 1776. Washington responded by clandestinely crossing the Delaware River and winning small but significant victories at Trenton and Princeton.

In the summer of 1777, as Howe was poised to capture Philadelphia, the Continental Congress fled to Baltimore. In October 1777, a separate northern British force under the command of John Burgoyne was forced to surrender at Saratoga in an American victory that proved crucial in convincing France and Spain that an independent United States was a viable possibility. France signed a commercial agreement with the revolutionaries, followed by a Treaty of Alliance in February 1778. In 1779, the Sullivan Expedition undertook a scorched earth campaign against British-allied factions of the Haudenosaunee Confederacy (also Iroquois). American Indian raids on the American frontier, however, continued to be a problem. Also, in 1779, Spain allied with France against Great Britain in the Treaty of Aranjuez, though Spain did not formally ally with the Americans.

Howe's replacement Henry Clinton intended to take the war against the British American colonists into the Southern Colonies. Despite some initial success, British General Cornwallis was besieged by a Franco-American army in Yorktown, Virginia, in September and October 1781. The French navy cut off Cornwallis's escape and he was forced to surrender in October. The British wars with France and Spain continued for another two years, but fighting largely ceased in North America. In the Treaty of Paris, signed on September 3, 1783, Great Britain acknowledged the sovereignty and independence of the United States, bringing the American Revolutionary War to an end. The Treaties of Versailles resolved Great Britain's conflicts with France and Spain, and forced Great Britain to cede Tobago, Senegal, and small territories in India to France, and Menorca, West Florida, and East Florida to Spain.

== Prelude to war ==
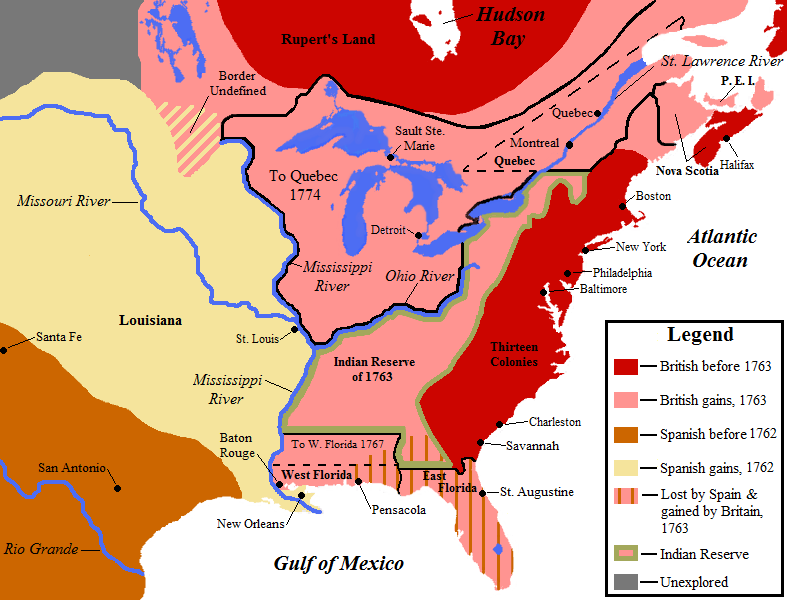
Map showing the territorial gains of Great Britain and Spain following the French and Indian War with lands held by the British prior to 1763 (in red), land gained by Britain in 1763 (in pink), and lands ceded to the Spanish Empire in secret during 1762 (in light yellow). As of 1775, European settlers were overwhelmingly concentrated in the Thirteen Colonies, which, at ~2.4 million, accounted for more than 90% of the total Colonial population of the depicted region. (For comparison, the entire Colonial population of Spanish Louisiana north of the present-day Louisiana/Arkansas border likely did not exceed 2,000.)

The French and Indian War, part of the wider global conflict known as the Seven Years' War, ended with the 1763 Peace of Paris, which expelled France from their possessions in New France. The Royal Proclamation of 1763 was designed to refocus colonial expansion north into Nova Scotia and south into Florida, with the Mississippi River as the dividing line between British and Spanish possessions in America. Settlement was tightly restricted beyond the 1763 limits, and claims west of this line, including by Virginia and Massachusetts, were rescinded. With the exception of Virginia and others deprived of rights to western lands, the colonial legislatures agreed on the boundaries but disagreed on where to set them. Many of the American settlers resented the restrictions entirely, and enforcement required permanent garrisons along the frontier, which led to increasingly bitter disputes over who should pay for them.

=== Taxation and legislation ===
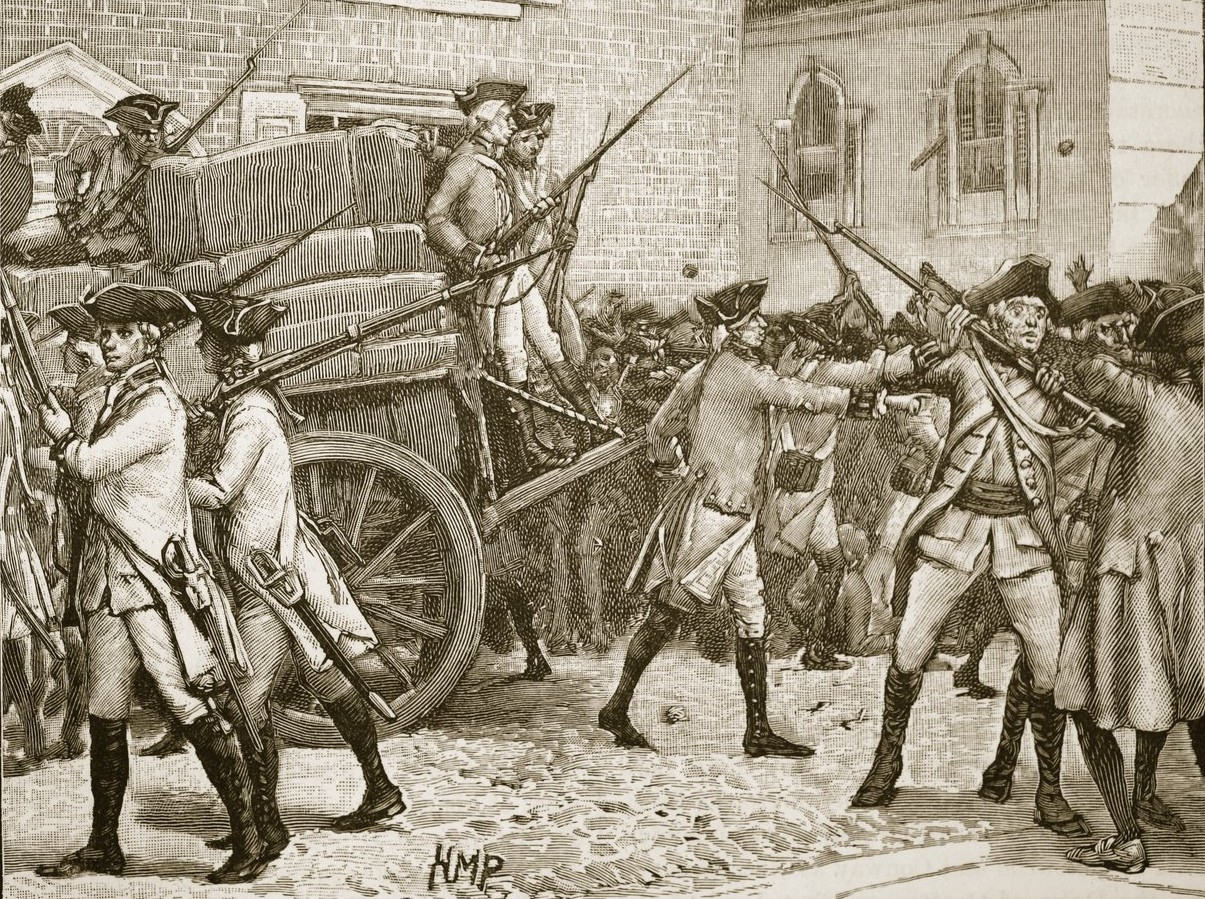
Troops escorting the stamped paper to the City Hall New York in 1766

The huge debt incurred by the Seven Years' War and demands from British taxpayers for cuts in government expenditure meant Parliament expected the colonies to fund their own defense. The 1763 to 1765 Grenville ministry instructed the British Royal Navy to cease trading smuggled goods and enforce customs duties levied in American ports. The most important was the 1733 Molasses Act; routinely ignored before 1763, it had a significant economic impact since 85% of New England rum exports were manufactured from imported molasses. These measures were followed by the Sugar Act and Stamp Act, which imposed additional taxes on the colonies to pay for defending the western frontier. The taxes proved highly burdensome, particularly for the poorer classes, and quickly became a source of discontent. In July 1765, the Whigs formed the First Rockingham ministry, which repealed the Stamp Act and reduced tax on foreign molasses to help the New England economy, but re-asserted Parliamentary authority in the Declaratory Act.

However, this did little to end the discontent; in 1768, a riot started in Boston when the authorities seized the sloop Liberty on suspicion of smuggling. Tensions escalated in March 1770 when British troops fired on rock-throwing civilians, killing five in what became known as the Boston Massacre. The Massacre coincided with the partial repeal of the Townshend Acts by the Tory-based North Ministry. North insisted on retaining duty on tea to enshrine Parliament's right to tax the colonies; the amount was minor, but ignored the fact it was that very principle Americans found objectionable.

In April 1772, colonialists staged the first American tax revolt against British royal authority in Weare, New Hampshire, later referred to as the Pine Tree Riot. This would inspire the design of the Pine Tree Flag. Tensions escalated following the destruction of a customs vessel in the June 1772 Gaspee Affair, then came to a head in 1773. A banking crisis led to the near-collapse of the East India Company, which dominated the British economy; to support it, Parliament passed the Tea Act, giving it a trading monopoly in the Thirteen Colonies. Since most American tea was smuggled by the Dutch, the act was opposed by those who managed the illegal trade, while being seen as another attempt to impose the principle of taxation by Parliament. In December 1773, a group called the Sons of Liberty disguised as Mohawks dumped crates of tea into Boston Harbor, an event later known as the Boston Tea Party. The British Parliament responded by passing the so-called Intolerable Acts, aimed specifically at Massachusetts, although many colonists and members of the Whig opposition considered them a threat to liberty in general. This increased sympathy for the Patriot cause locally, in the British Parliament, and in the London press.

=== Break with the British Crown ===
Throughout the 18th century, the elected lower houses in the colonial legislatures gradually wrested power from their governors. Dominated by smaller landowners and merchants, these assemblies now established ad-hoc provincial legislatures, effectively replacing royal control. With the exception of Georgia, twelve colonies sent representatives to the First Continental Congress to agree on a unified response to the crisis. Many of the delegates feared that a boycott would result in war and sent a Petition to the King calling for the repeal of the Intolerable Acts. After some debate, on September 17, 1774, Congress endorsed the Massachusetts Suffolk Resolves and on October 20 passed the Continental Association, which instituted economic sanctions and a boycott of goods against Britain.

While denying its authority over internal American affairs, a faction led by James Duane and future Loyalist Joseph Galloway insisted Congress recognize Parliament's right to regulate colonial trade. (Note: "Resolved, 4. That the foundation of English liberty, and of all free government, is a right in the people to participate in their legislative council: ... they are entitled to a free and exclusive power of legislation in their several provincial legislatures, where their right of representation can alone be preserved, in all cases of taxation and internal polity, subject only to the negative of their sovereign, ...: But, ... we cheerfully consent to the operation of such acts of the British parliament, as are bonafide, restrained to the regulation of our external commerce, for the purpose of securing the commercial advantages of the whole empire to the mother country, and the commercial benefits of its respective members; excluding every idea of taxation internal or external, [without the consent of American subjects]." quoted from the Declarations and Resolves of the First Continental Congress October 14, 1774.) Expecting concessions by the North administration, Congress authorized the colonial legislatures to enforce the boycott; this succeeded in reducing British imports by 97% from 1774 to 1775. However, on February 9 Parliament declared Massachusetts to be in rebellion and instituted a blockade of the colony. In July, the Restraining Acts limited colonial trade with the British West Indies and Britain and barred New England ships from the Newfoundland cod fisheries. The tension led to a scramble for control of militia stores, which each assembly was legally obliged to maintain for defense. On April 19, a British attempt to secure the Concord arsenal culminated in the Battles of Lexington and Concord, which began the Revolutionary War.

=== Political reactions ===
The Committee of Five, who were charged with drafting the Declaration of Independence, including (from left to right): John Adams (chair), Roger Sherman, Robert Livingston, Thomas Jefferson (the Declaration's principal author), and Benjamin Franklin

After the Patriot victory at Concord, moderates in Congress led by John Dickinson drafted the Olive Branch Petition, offering to accept royal authority in return for George III mediating in the dispute. However, since the petition was immediately followed by the Declaration of the Causes and Necessity of Taking Up Arms, Colonial Secretary Lord Dartmouth viewed the offer as insincere and refused to present the petition to the king. Although constitutionally correct, since the monarch could not oppose his own government, it disappointed those Americans who hoped he would mediate in the dispute, while the hostility of his language annoyed even Loyalist members of Congress. Combined with the Proclamation of Rebellion, issued on August 23 in response to the Battle at Bunker Hill, it ended hopes of a peaceful settlement.

Backed by the Whigs, Parliament initially rejected the imposition of coercive measures by 170 votes, fearing an aggressive policy would drive the Americans towards independence. However, by the end of 1774 the collapse of British authority meant both Lord North and George III were convinced war was inevitable. After Boston, Gage halted operations and awaited reinforcements; the Irish Parliament approved the recruitment of new regiments, while allowing Catholics to enlist for the first time. Britain also signed a series of treaties with German states to supply additional troops. Within a year, it had an army of over 32,000 men in America, the largest ever sent outside Europe at the time. The employment of German soldiers against people viewed as British citizens was opposed by many in Parliament and by the colonial assemblies; combined with the lack of activity by Gage, opposition to the use of foreign troops allowed the Patriots to take control of the legislatures.

=== Declaration of Independence ===
Support for independence was boosted by Thomas Paine's pamphlet Common Sense, which was published on January 10, 1776, and argued for American self-government and was widely reprinted. To draft the Declaration of Independence, the Second Continental Congress appointed the Committee of Five: Thomas Jefferson, John Adams, Benjamin Franklin, Roger Sherman, and Robert Livingston. The declaration was written almost exclusively by Jefferson.

Identifying inhabitants of the Thirteen Colonies as "one people", the declaration simultaneously dissolved political links with Britain, while including a long list of alleged violations of "English rights" committed by George III. This is also one of the first times that the colonies were referred to as "United States", rather than the more common United Colonies. On July 2, Congress voted for independence and published the declaration on July 4.

At this point, the revolution ceased to be an internal dispute over trade and tax policies between the Thirteen Colonies and Great Britain, becoming a civil war, with each state represented in Congress engaged in a struggle with Britain. The conflict was also a civil war between American Patriots and American Loyalists. Patriots generally supported independence from Britain and a new national union in Congress, while Loyalists remained supportive of British rule. Estimates of numbers vary, one suggestion being the population as a whole was split evenly between committed Patriots, committed Loyalists, and those who were indifferent. Others calculate the split as 40% Patriot, 40% neutral, 20% Loyalist, but with considerable regional variations.

At the onset of the war, the Second Continental Congress realized defeating Britain required foreign alliances and intelligence-gathering. The Committee of Secret Correspondence was formed for "the sole purpose of corresponding with our friends in Great Britain and other parts of the world". From 1775 to 1776, the committee shared information and built alliances through secret correspondence, as well as employing secret agents in Europe to gather intelligence, conduct undercover operations, analyze foreign publications, and set up Patriot propaganda campaigns. Paine served as secretary, while Benjamin Franklin and Silas Deane, sent to France, Britain's longtime rival, to recruit military engineers, were instrumental in securing French aid in Paris.

== War breaks out ==
=== Early engagements ===
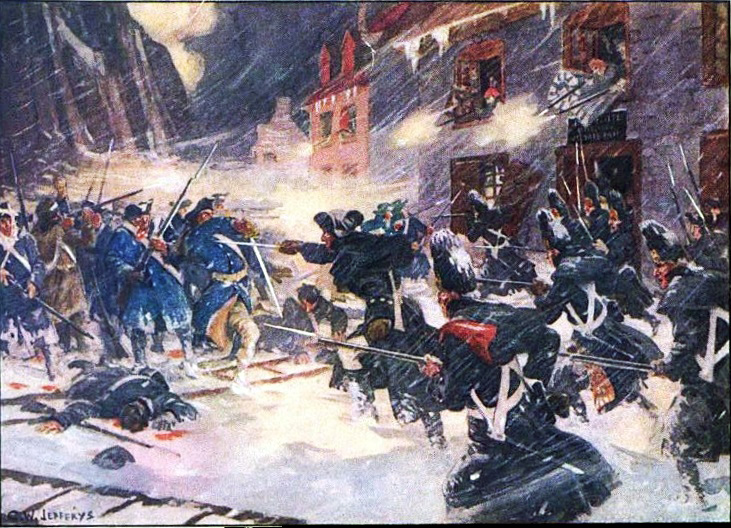
The British repulse a Continental Army attack at the Battle of Quebec in December 1775.

The Battle of Sullivan's Island

On April 14, 1775, Sir Thomas Gage, Commander-in-Chief, North America and Governor of Massachusetts, received orders to take action against the Patriots. He decided to destroy militia ordnance stored at Concord, Massachusetts, and capture John Hancock and Samuel Adams, who were considered the principal instigators of the rebellion. The operation was to begin around midnight on April 19, in the hope of completing it before the American Patriots could respond. However, the Patriots had already caught wind of General Gage's plans. A few hours before midnight of the 18th, Patriot dispatch riders left Boston to warn Lexington, Concord, and other towns of the British's battle plans. The first action of the war, commonly referred to as the shot heard round the world, was a brief skirmish at Lexington, followed by the full-scale Battles of Lexington and Concord. British troops suffered around 300 casualties before withdrawing to Boston, which was then besieged by the militia.

In May 1775, 4,500 British reinforcements arrived under Generals William Howe, John Burgoyne, and Sir Henry Clinton. On June 17, they seized the Charlestown Peninsula at the Battle of Bunker Hill, a frontal assault in which they suffered over 1,000 casualties. Dismayed at the costly attack which had gained them little, Gage appealed to London for a larger army, but instead was replaced as commander by Howe.

On June 14, 1775, Congress took control of Patriot forces outside Boston, and Congressional leader John Adams nominated Washington as commander-in-chief of the newly formed Continental Army. On June 16, Hancock officially proclaimed him "General and Commander in Chief of the army of the United Colonies." He assumed command on July 3, preferring to fortify Dorchester Heights outside Boston rather than assaulting it. In early March 1776, Colonel Henry Knox arrived with heavy artillery acquired in the Capture of Fort Ticonderoga. Under cover of darkness, on March 5, Washington placed these on Dorchester Heights, from where they could fire on the town and British ships in Boston Harbor. Fearing another Bunker Hill, Howe evacuated the city on March 17 without further loss and sailed to Halifax, Nova Scotia, while Washington moved south to New York City.

Beginning in August 1775, American privateers raided towns in Nova Scotia, including Saint John, Charlottetown, and Yarmouth. In 1776, John Paul Jones and Jonathan Eddy attacked Canso and Fort Cumberland respectively. British officials in Quebec began negotiating with the Iroquois for their support, while US envoys urged them to remain neutral. Aware of Native American leanings toward the British and fearing an Anglo-Indian attack from Canada, Congress authorized a second invasion in April 1775. After the defeat at the Battle of Quebec on December 31, the Americans maintained a loose blockade of the city until they retreated on May 6, 1776. A second defeat at Trois-Rivières on June 8 ended operations in Quebec.

British pursuit was initially blocked by American naval vessels on Lake Champlain until victory at Valcour Island on October 11 forced the Americans to withdraw to Fort Ticonderoga, while in December an uprising in Nova Scotia sponsored by Massachusetts was defeated at Fort Cumberland. These failures impacted public support for the Patriot cause, and aggressive anti-Loyalist policies in the New England colonies alienated the Canadians.

In Virginia, Dunmore's Proclamation on November 7, 1775, promised freedom to any slaves who fled their Patriot masters and agreed to fight for the Crown. British forces were defeated at Great Bridge on December 9 and took refuge on British ships anchored near Norfolk. When the Third Virginia Convention refused to disband its militia or accept martial law, Lord Dunmore ordered the Burning of Norfolk on January 1, 1776.

The siege of Savage's Old Fields began on November 19 in South Carolina between Loyalist and Patriot militias, and the Loyalists were subsequently driven out of the colony in the Snow Campaign. Loyalists were recruited in North Carolina to reassert British rule in the South, but they were decisively defeated in the Battle of Moore's Creek Bridge. A British expedition sent to reconquer South Carolina launched an attack on Charleston in the Battle of Sullivan's Island on June 28, 1776, but it failed.

A shortage of gunpowder led Congress to authorize a naval expedition against the Bahamas to secure ordnance stored there. On March 3, 1776, an American squadron under the command of Esek Hopkins landed at the east end of Nassau and encountered minimal resistance at Fort Montagu. Hopkins' troops then marched on Fort Nassau. Hopkins had promised governor Montfort Browne and the civilian inhabitants that their lives and property would not be in any danger if they offered no resistance; they complied. Hopkins captured large stores of powder and other munitions that was so great he had to impress an extra ship in the harbor to transport the supplies back home, when he departed on March 17. A month later, after a brief skirmish with HMS Glasgow, they returned to New London, Connecticut, the base for American naval operations.

=== British New York counter-offensive ===
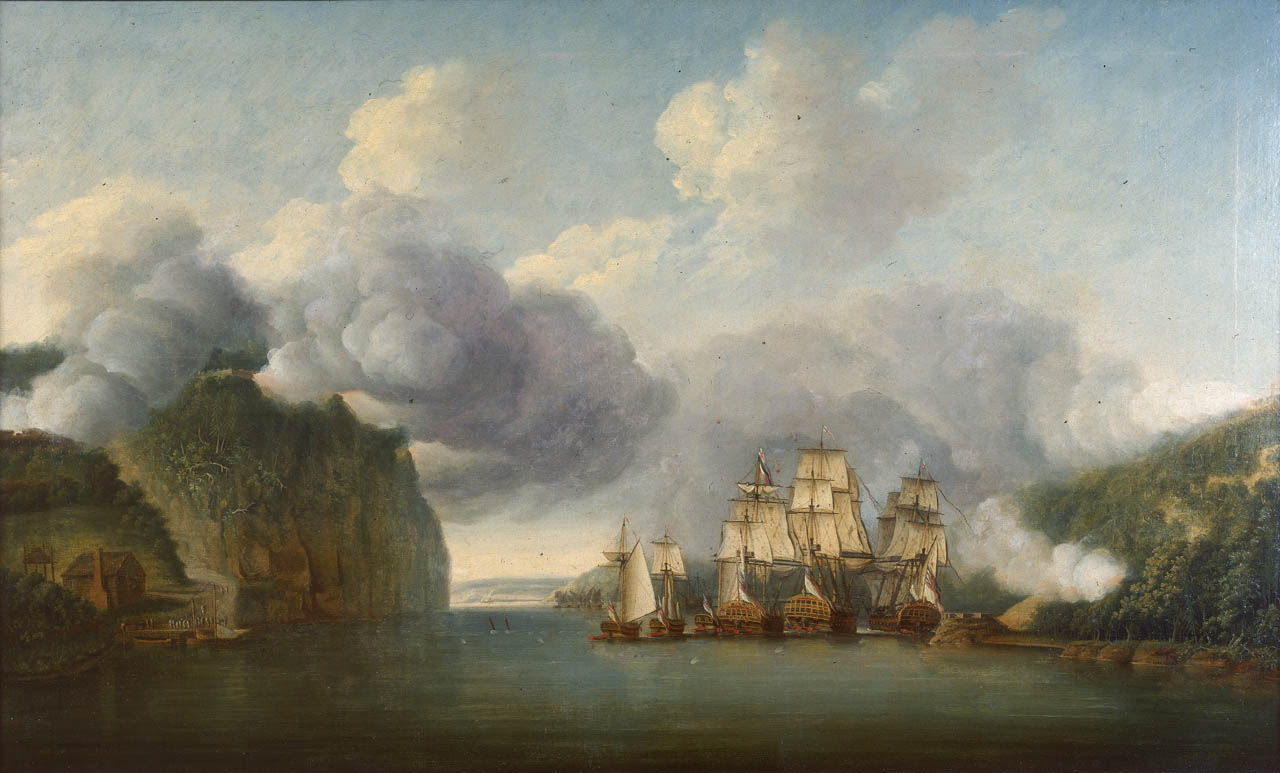
The British used the Narrows, connecting Upper and Lower New York Bay, to isolate Fort Washington in the Battle of Fort Washington in November 1776.

After regrouping at Halifax in Nova Scotia, Howe set sail for New York in June 1776 and began landing troops on Staten Island near the entrance to New York Harbor on July 2. The Americans rejected Howe's informal attempt to negotiate peace on July 30; Washington knew that an attack on the city was imminent and realized that he needed advance information to deal with disciplined British regular troops.

On August 12, 1776, Patriot Thomas Knowlton was ordered to form an elite group for reconnaissance and secret missions. Knowlton's Rangers, which included Nathan Hale, became the Army's first intelligence unit. (Note: To learn when and where the attack would occur Washington asked for a volunteer among the Rangers to spy on activity behind enemy lines in Brooklyn. Young Nathan Hale stepped forward, but he was only able to provide Washington with nominal intelligence at that time. On September 21, Hale was recognized in a New York City tavern, and was apprehended with maps and sketches of British fortifications and troop positions in his pockets. Howe ordered that he be summarily hung as a spy without trial the next day.) When Washington was driven off Long Island, he soon realized that he would need to professionalize military intelligence. With aid from Benjamin Tallmadge, Washington launched the six-man Culper spy ring. (Note: Tallmadge's cover name became John Bolton, and he was the architect of the spy ring.) The efforts of Washington and the Culper Spy Ring substantially increased the effective allocation and deployment of Continental regiments in the field. Throughout the war, Washington spent more than 10 percent of his total military funds on military intelligence.

Washington split the Continental Army into positions on Manhattan and across the East River in western Long Island. On August 27 at the Battle of Long Island, Howe outflanked Washington and forced him back to Brooklyn Heights, but he did not attempt to encircle Washington's forces. Through the night of August 28, Knox bombarded the British. Knowing they were up against overwhelming odds, Washington ordered the assembly of a war council on August 29; all agreed to retreat to Manhattan. Washington quickly had his troops assembled and ferried them across the East River to Manhattan on flat-bottomed freight boats without any losses in men or ordnance, leaving General Thomas Mifflin's regiments as a rearguard.

Howe met with a delegation from the Second Continental Congress at the September Staten Island Peace Conference, but it failed to conclude peace, largely because the British delegates only had the authority to offer pardons and could not recognize independence. On September 15, Howe seized control of New York City when the British landed at Kip's Bay and unsuccessfully engaged the Americans at the Battle of Harlem Heights the following day. On October 18, Howe failed to encircle the Americans at the Battle of Pell's Point, and the Americans withdrew. Howe declined to close with Washington's army on October 28 at the Battle of White Plains and instead attacked a hill that was of no strategic value.

Washington's retreat isolated his remaining forces and the British captured Fort Washington on November 16. The British victory there amounted to Washington's most disastrous defeat with the loss of 3,000 prisoners. The remaining American regiments on Long Island fell back four days later. General Henry Clinton wanted to pursue Washington's disorganized army, but he was first required to commit 6,000 troops to capture Newport, Rhode Island, to secure the Loyalist port. (Note: The American prisoners were subsequently sent to the prison ships in the East River, where more American soldiers and sailors died of disease and neglect than died in every battle of the war combined.) General Charles Cornwallis pursued Washington, but Howe ordered him to halt.

The outlook following the defeat at Fort Washington appeared bleak for the American cause. The reduced Continental Army had dwindled to fewer than 5,000 men and was reduced further when enlistments expired at the end of the year. Popular support wavered, and morale declined. On December 20, 1776, the Continental Congress abandoned the revolutionary capital of Philadelphia and moved to Baltimore, where it remained until February 27, 1777. Loyalist activity surged in the wake of the American defeat, especially in New York state.

In London, news of the victorious Long Island campaign was well received with festivities held in the capital. Public support reached a peak. Strategic deficiencies among Patriot forces were evident: Washington divided a numerically weaker army in the face of a stronger one, his inexperienced staff misread the military situation, and American troops fled in the face of enemy fire. The successes led to predictions that the British could win within a year. The British established winter quarters in the New York City area and anticipated renewed campaigning the following spring.

=== Patriot resurgence ===
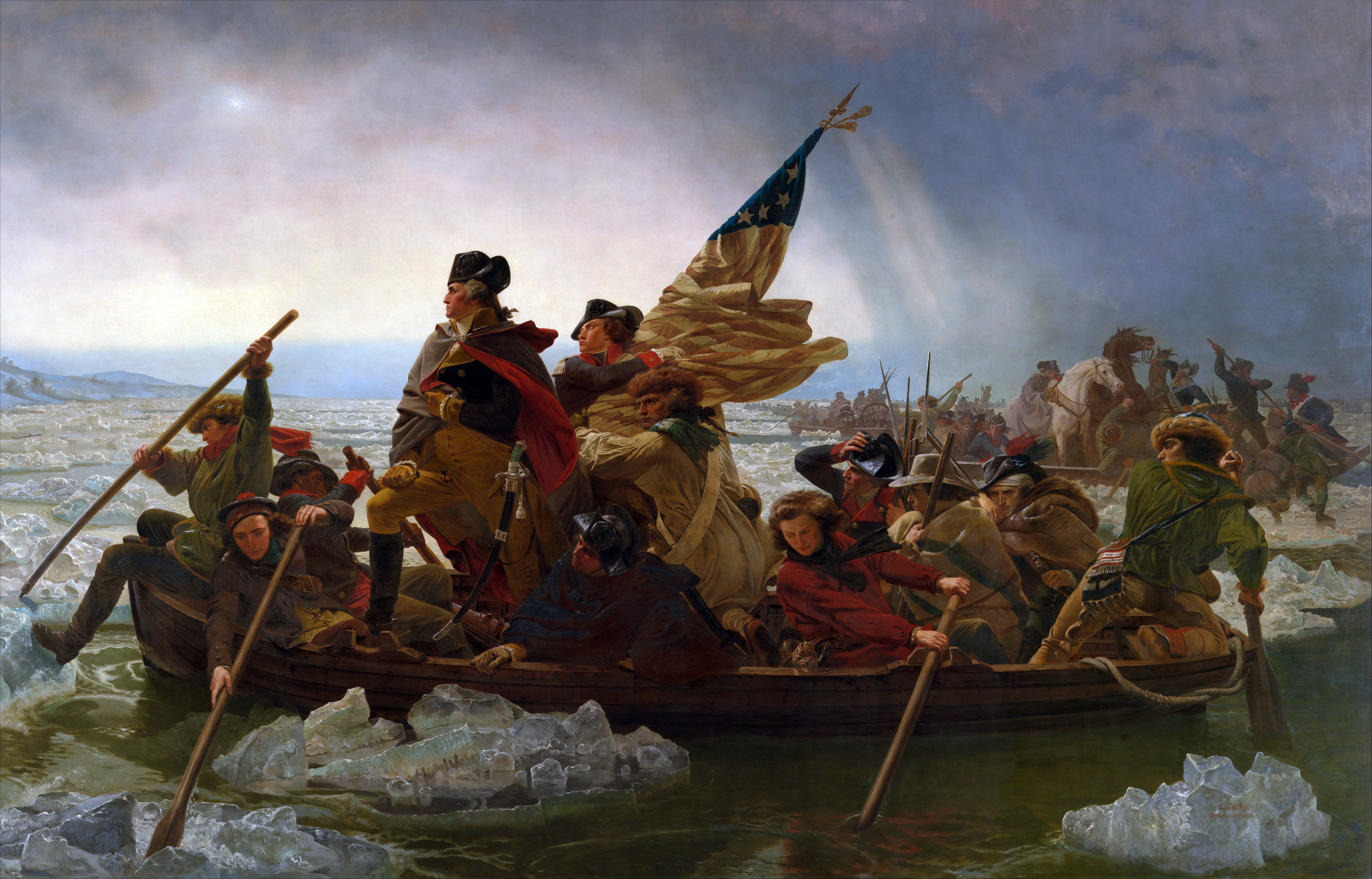
Washington Crossing the Delaware, an iconic 1851 Emanuel Leutze portrait depicting Washington's covert crossing of the Delaware River on December 25–26, 1776

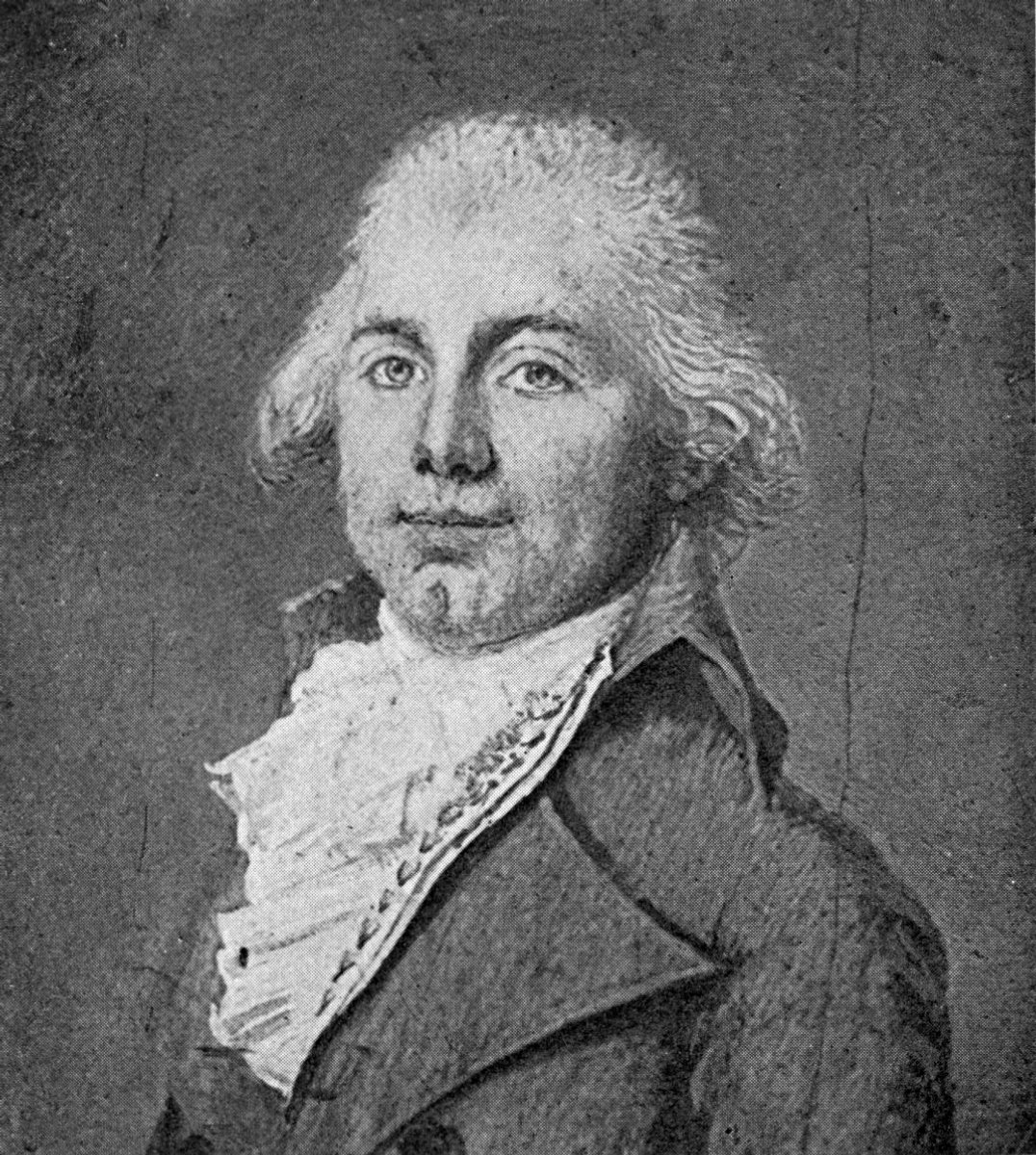
James Monroe, the last US president to fight in the Revolutionary War as a Continental Army officer, took part in the crossing of the Delaware River and the Battle of Trenton alongside George Washington.

On the night of December 25–26, 1776, Washington crossed the Delaware River, leading a column of Continental Army troops from today's Bucks County, Pennsylvania, to today's Mercer County, New Jersey, in a logistically challenging and dangerous operation.

Meanwhile, the Hessians were involved in numerous clashes with small bands of Patriots and were often aroused by false alarms at night in the weeks before the actual Battle of Trenton. By Christmas they were tired, while a heavy snowstorm led their commander, Colonel Johann Rall, to assume no significant attack would occur. At daybreak on the 26th, the American Patriots surprised and overwhelmed Rall and his troops, who lost over 20 killed including Rall, while 900 prisoners, German cannons and supplies were captured.

The Battle of Trenton restored the American army's morale, reinvigorated the Patriot cause, and dispelled their fear of what they regarded as Hessian "mercenaries". A British attempt to retake Trenton was repulsed at Assunpink Creek on January 2; during the night, Washington outmaneuvered Cornwallis, then defeated his rearguard in the Battle of Princeton the following day. The two victories helped convince the French that the Americans were worthy military allies.

After his success at Princeton, Washington entered winter quarters at Morristown, New Jersey, where he remained until May and received Congressional direction to inoculate all Patriot troops against smallpox. (Note: The mandate came by way of Benjamin Rush, chair of the Medical Committee. Congress had directed that all troops who had not previously survived smallpox infection be inoculated. In explaining himself to state governors, Washington lamented that he had lost "an army" to smallpox in 1776 by the "Natural way" of immunity.) With the exception of a minor skirmishing between the two armies which continued until March, Howe made no attempt to attack the Americans.

=== British northern strategy fails ===
Saratoga campaign maneuvers and (inset) the Battles of Saratoga in September and October 1777

The 1776 campaign demonstrated that regaining New England would be a prolonged affair, which led to a change in British strategy to isolating the north by taking control of the Hudson River, allowing them to focus on the south where Loyalist support was believed to be substantial. In December 1776, Howe wrote to the Colonial Secretary Lord Germain, proposing a limited offensive against Philadelphia, while a second force moved down the Hudson from Canada. Burgoyne supplied several alternatives, all of which gave him responsibility for the offensive, with Howe remaining on the defensive. The option selected required him to lead the main force south from Montreal down the Hudson Valley, while a detachment under Barry St. Leger moved east from Lake Ontario. The two would meet at Albany, leaving Howe to decide whether to join them. Reasonable in principle, this did not account for the logistical difficulties involved and Burgoyne erroneously assumed Howe would remain on the defensive; Germain's failure to make this clear meant he opted to attack Philadelphia instead.

With a mixed force of British regulars, professional German soldiers and Canadian militia Burgoyne set out on June 14, 1777, and captured Fort Ticonderoga on July 5. As General Horatio Gates retreated, his troops blocked roads, destroyed bridges, dammed streams, and stripped the area of food. This slowed Burgoyne's progress and forced him to send out large foraging expeditions; one of more than 700 British troops were captured at the Battle of Bennington on August 16. St Leger moved east and besieged Fort Stanwix; despite defeating an American relief force at the Battle of Oriskany on August 6, St. Leger was abandoned by his Indian allies and withdrew to Quebec on August 22. Now isolated and outnumbered by Gates, Burgoyne continued onto Albany rather than retreating to Fort Ticonderoga, reaching Saratoga on September 13. He asked Clinton for support while constructing defenses around the town.

Morale among his troops rapidly declined, and an unsuccessful attempt to break past Gates at the Battle of Freeman Farms on September 19 resulted in 600 British casualties. When Clinton advised he could not reach them, Burgoyne's subordinates advised retreat; a reconnaissance in force on October 7 was repulsed by Gates at the Battle of Bemis Heights, forcing them back into Saratoga with heavy losses. By October 11, all hope of British escape had vanished; persistent rain reduced the camp to a "squalid hell" and supplies were dangerously low. Burgoyne capitulated on October 17; around 6,222 soldiers, including German forces commanded by General Friedrich Adolf Riedesel, surrendered their arms before being taken to Boston, where they were to be transported to England.

After securing additional supplies, Howe made another attempt on Philadelphia by landing his troops in Chesapeake Bay on August 24. He now compounded failure to support Burgoyne by missing repeated opportunities to destroy his opponent: despite defeating Washington at the Battle of Brandywine on September 11, he then allowed him to withdraw in good order. After dispersing an American detachment at Paoli on September 20, Cornwallis occupied Philadelphia on September 26, with the main force of 9,000 under Howe based just to the north at Germantown. Washington attacked them on October 4, but was repulsed.

To prevent Howe's forces in Philadelphia being resupplied by sea, the Patriots erected Fort Mifflin and nearby Fort Mercer on the east and west banks of the Delaware respectively, and placed obstacles in the river south of the city. This was supported by a small flotilla of Continental Navy ships on the Delaware, supplemented by the Pennsylvania State Navy, commanded by John Hazelwood. An attempt by the Royal Navy to take the forts in the October 20 to 22 Battle of Red Bank failed; a second attack captured Fort Mifflin on November 16, while Fort Mercer was abandoned two days later when Cornwallis breached the walls. His supply lines secured, Howe tried to tempt Washington into giving battle, but after inconclusive skirmishing at the Battle of White Marsh from December 5 to 8, he withdrew to Philadelphia for the winter.

On December 19, the Americans followed suit and entered winter quarters at Valley Forge. As Washington's domestic opponents contrasted his lack of battlefield success with Gates' victory at Saratoga, foreign observers such as Frederick the Great were equally impressed with Washington's command at Germantown, which demonstrated resilience and determination. Over the winter, poor conditions, supply problems and low morale resulted in 2,000 deaths, with another 3,000 unfit for duty due to lack of shoes. However, Baron Friedrich Wilhelm von Steuben took the opportunity to introduce Prussian Army drill and infantry tactics to "model companies" in each Continental Army regiment, who then instructed their home units. Despite Valley Forge being only twenty miles away, Howe made no effort to attack their camp, an action some critics argue could have ended the war.

=== Foreign intervention ===
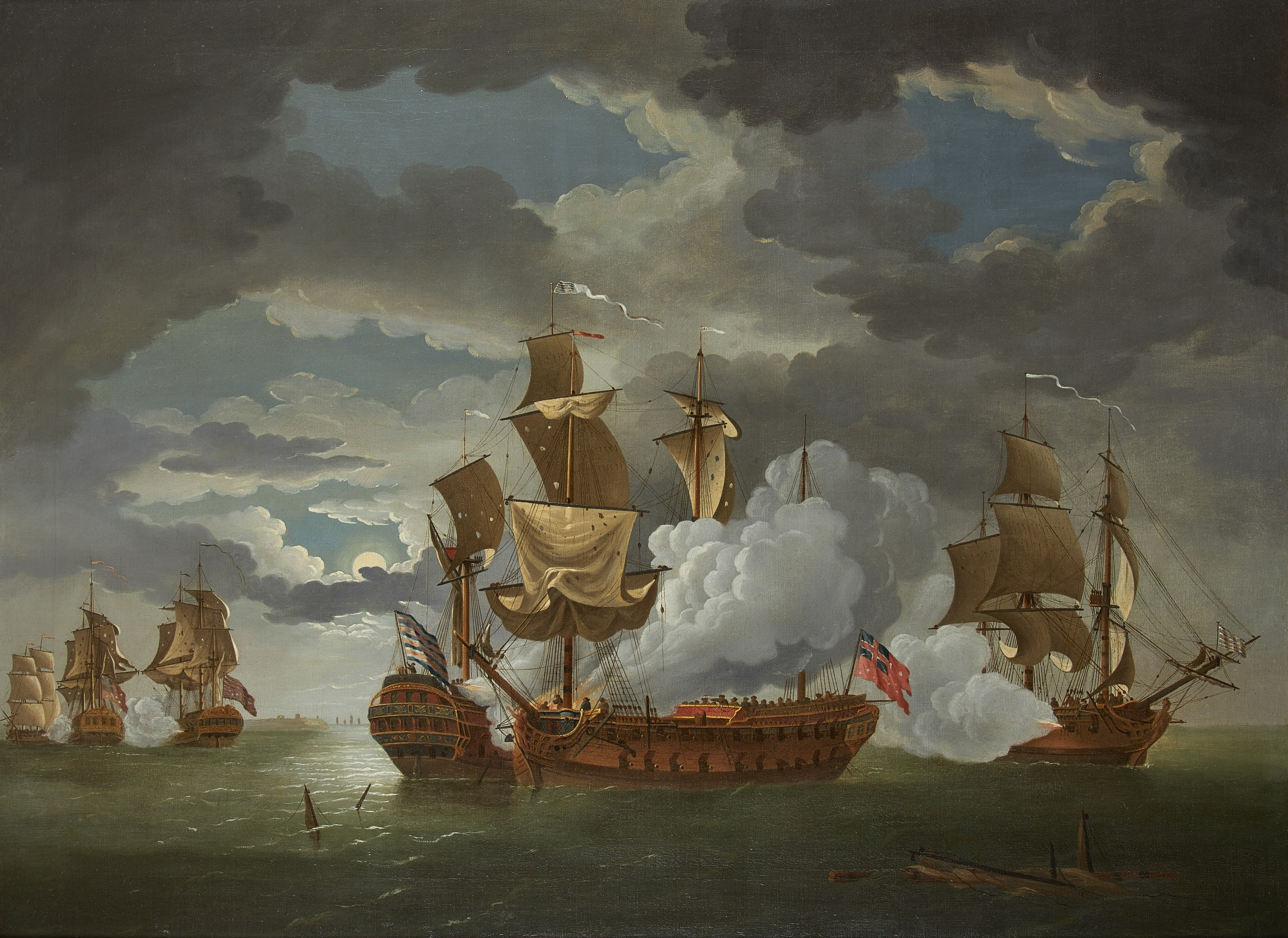
The Battle of Flamborough Head with US warships in European waters with access to Dutch, French, and Spanish ports

Like his predecessors, French foreign minister Vergennes considered the 1763 Peace a national humiliation and viewed the war as an opportunity to weaken Britain. He initially avoided open conflict, but allowed American ships to take on cargoes in French ports, a technical violation of neutrality. Vergennes persuaded Louis XVI to secretly fund a government front company to purchase munitions for the Patriots, carried in neutral Dutch ships and imported through Sint Eustatius in the Caribbean.

Many Americans opposed a French alliance, fearing to "exchange one tyranny for another", but this changed after a series of military setbacks in early 1776. As France had nothing to gain from the colonies reconciling with Britain, Congress had three choices: making peace on British terms, continuing the struggle on their own, or proclaiming independence, guaranteed by France. Although the Declaration of Independence had wide public support, over 20% of Congressmen voted against an alliance with France. Congress agreed to the treaty with reluctance and as the war moved in their favor increasingly lost interest in it.

Silas Deane was sent to Paris to begin negotiations with Vergennes, whose key objectives were replacing Britain as the United States' primary commercial and military partner while securing the French West Indies from American expansion. These islands were extremely valuable; in 1772, the value of sugar and coffee produced by Saint-Domingue on its own exceeded that of all American exports combined. Talks progressed slowly until October 1777, when British defeat at Saratoga and their apparent willingness to negotiate peace convinced Vergennes only a permanent alliance could prevent the "disaster" of Anglo-American rapprochement. Assurances of formal French support allowed Congress to reject the Carlisle Peace Commission and insist on nothing short of complete independence.

On February 6, 1778, France and the United States signed the Treaty of Amity and Commerce regulating trade between the two countries, followed by a defensive military alliance against Britain, the Treaty of Alliance. In return for French guarantees of American independence, Congress undertook to defend their interests in the West Indies, while both sides agreed not to make a separate peace; conflict over these provisions would lead to the 1798 to 1800 Quasi-War. Charles III of Spain was invited to join on the same terms but refused, largely due to concerns over the impact of the Revolution on Spanish colonies in the Americas. Spain had complained on multiple occasions about encroachment by American settlers into Louisiana, a problem that could only get worse once the United States replaced Britain.

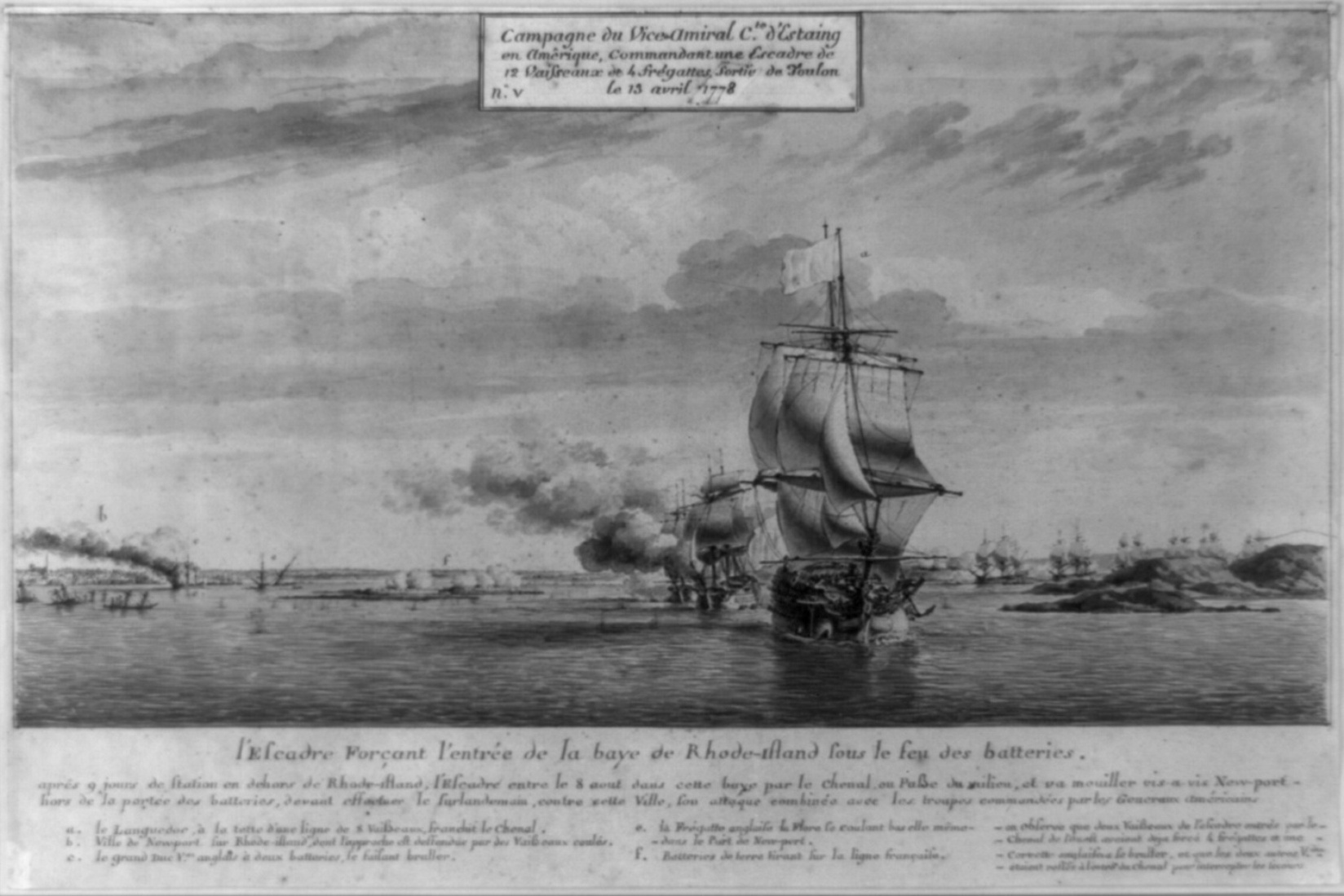
French Admiral d'Estaing's joint expedition with Sullivan at the Battle of Rhode Island in August 1778

Although Spain ultimately made important contributions to American success, in the Treaty of Aranjuez, Charles agreed only to support France's war with Britain outside America, in return for help in recovering Gibraltar, Menorca and Spanish Florida. The terms were confidential since several conflicted with American aims; for example, the French claimed exclusive control of the Newfoundland cod fisheries, a non-negotiable for colonies like Massachusetts. One less well-known impact of this agreement was the abiding American distrust of 'foreign entanglements'; the US would not sign another treaty with France until their NATO agreement of 1949. This was because the US had agreed not to make peace without France, while Aranjuez committed France to keep fighting until Spain recovered Gibraltar, effectively making it a condition of US independence without the knowledge of Congress.

To encourage French participation in the struggle for independence, the US representative in Paris, Silas Deane, promised promotion and command positions to any French officer who joined the Continental Army. This included Gilbert du Motier, Marquis de Lafayette, whom Congress via Dean appointed a major general, on July 31, 1777.

When the war started, Britain tried to borrow the Dutch-based Scots Brigade for service in America, but pro-Patriot sentiment led the States General to refuse. Although the Republic was no longer a major power, prior to 1774 they still dominated the European carrying trade, and Dutch merchants made large profits shipping French-supplied munitions to the Patriots. This ended when Britain declared war in December 1780, a conflict that proved disastrous to the Dutch economy.

The British government failed to take into account the strength of the American merchant marine and support from European countries, which allowed the colonies to import munitions and continue trading with relative impunity. While well aware of this, the North administration delayed placing the Royal Navy on a war footing for cost reasons; this prevented the institution of an effective blockade. Traditional British policy was to employ European land-based allies to divert the opposition; in 1778, they were diplomatically isolated and faced war on multiple fronts.

Meanwhile, George III had given up on subduing America while Britain had a European war to fight. He did not welcome war with France, but he held the British victories over France in the Seven Years' War as a reason to believe in ultimate victory over France. Britain subsequently changed its focus into the Caribbean theater, and diverted major military resources away from America.

=== Stalemate in the North ===
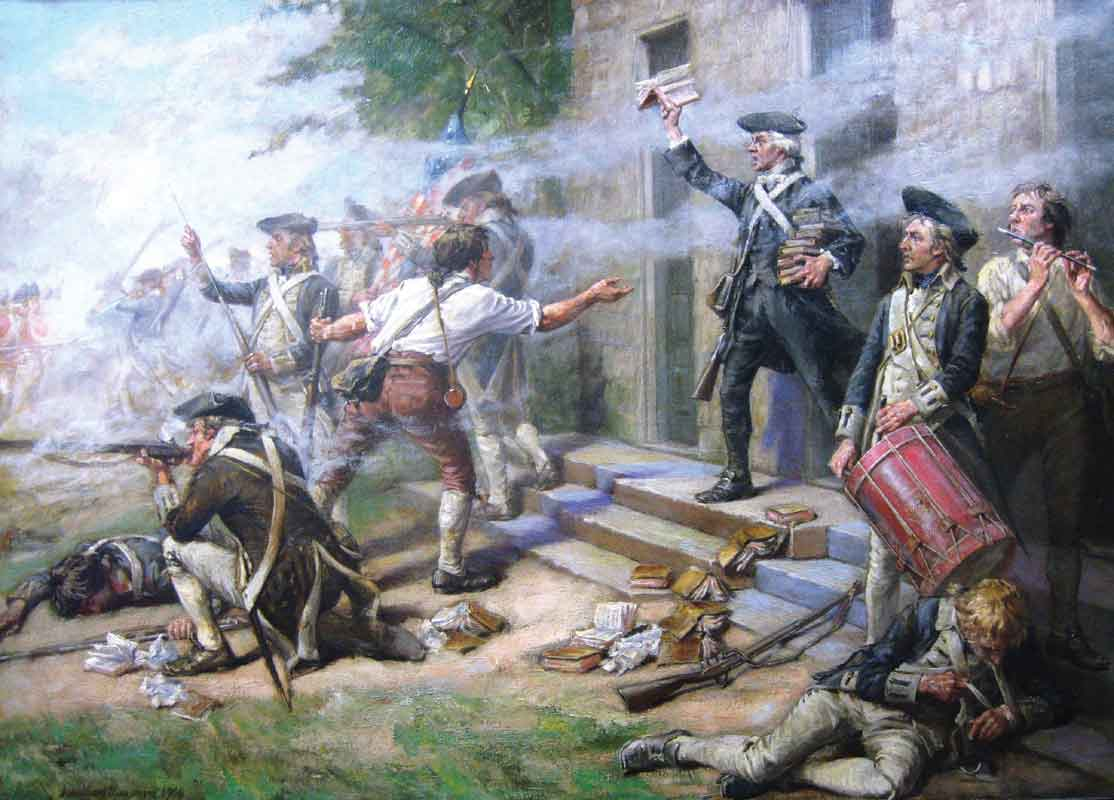
Continentals repulsing the British at the Battle of Springfield in June 1780; "Give 'em Watts, boys!"

At the end of 1777, Howe resigned and was replaced by Sir Henry Clinton on May 24, 1778; with French entry into the war, he was ordered to consolidate his forces in New York. On June 18, the British departed Philadelphia with the reinvigorated Americans in pursuit; the Battle of Monmouth on June 28 was inconclusive but boosted Patriot morale. That midnight, the newly installed Clinton continued his retreat to New York. A French naval force under Admiral Charles Henri Hector d'Estaing was sent to assist Washington; deciding New York was too formidable a target, in August they launched a combined attack on Newport, with General John Sullivan commanding land forces. The resulting Battle of Rhode Island was indecisive; badly damaged by a storm, the French withdrew to avoid risking their ships.

Further activity was limited to British raids on Chestnut Neck and Little Egg Harbor in October. In July 1779, the Americans captured British positions at Stony Point and Paulus Hook. Clinton unsuccessfully tried to tempt Washington into a decisive engagement by sending General William Tryon to raid Connecticut. In July, a large American naval operation, the Penobscot Expedition, attempted to retake Maine but was defeated. Persistent raids by British-allied tribes in New York and Pennsylvania led to the punitive Sullivan Expedition from July to September 1779. Involving more than 4,000 patriot soldiers, the scorched earth campaign destroyed more than 40 Iroquois villages and 160,000 bushels (4,000 mts) of maize, leaving the British-allied tribes of the Iroquois destitute and destroying the Haudenosaunee Confederacy as an independent power on the American frontier. However, 5,000 British-allied tribes of Iroquois fled to Canada where, supplied and supported by the British, they continued their raids.

During the winter of 1779–1780, the Continental Army suffered greater hardships than at Valley Forge. Morale was poor, public support fell away, the Continental dollar was virtually worthless, the army was plagued with supply problems, desertion was common, and mutinies occurred in the Pennsylvania Line and New Jersey Line regiments over the conditions.

In June 1780, Clinton sent 6,000 men under Wilhelm von Knyphausen to retake New Jersey, but they were halted by local militia at the Battle of Connecticut Farms; although the Americans withdrew, Knyphausen felt he was not strong enough to engage Washington's main force and retreated. A second attempt two weeks later ended in a British defeat at the Battle of Springfield, effectively ending their ambitions in New Jersey. In July, Washington appointed Benedict Arnold commander of West Point; his attempt to betray the fort to the British failed due to incompetent planning, and the plot was revealed when his British contact John André was captured and executed. Arnold escaped to New York and switched sides, an action justified in a pamphlet addressed "To the Inhabitants of America"; the Patriots condemned his betrayal, while he found himself almost as unpopular with the British.

=== War in the South ===
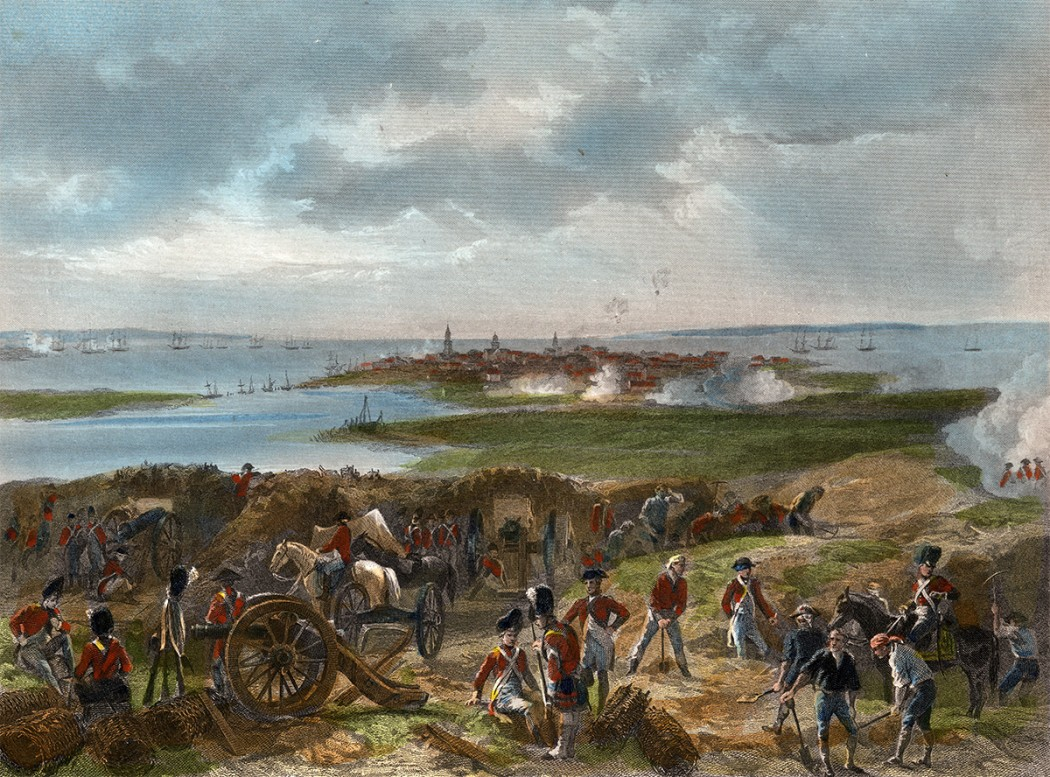
The British siege of Charleston in May 1780

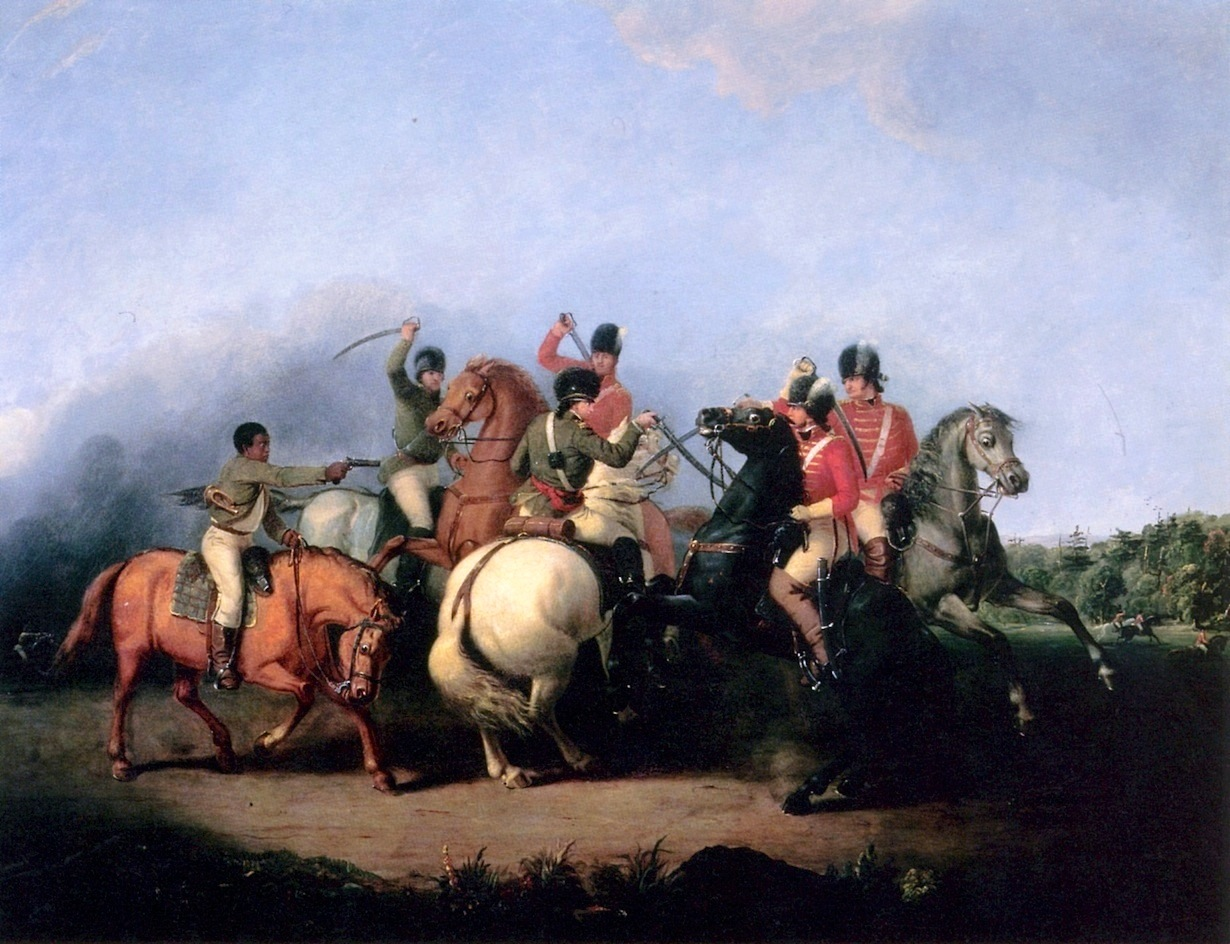
The Continental Army routs the British Legion at the Battle of Cowpens in Cowpens, South Carolina, in January 1781.

The Southern Strategy was developed by Lord Germain, based on input from London-based Loyalists, including Joseph Galloway. They argued that it made no sense to fight the Patriots in the north where they were strongest, while the New England economy was reliant on trade with Britain. On the other hand, duties on tobacco made the South far more profitable for Britain, while local support meant securing it required small numbers of regular troops. Victory would leave a truncated United States facing British possessions to the south, north, and west; with the Atlantic seaboard controlled by the Royal Navy, Congress would be forced to agree to terms. However, assumptions about the level of Loyalist support proved wildly optimistic.

Germain ordered Augustine Prevost, the British commander in East Florida, to advance into Georgia in December 1778. Lieutenant-Colonel Archibald Campbell, an experienced officer, captured Savannah on December 29, 1778. He recruited a Loyalist militia of nearly 1,100, many of whom allegedly joined only after Campbell threatened to confiscate their property. Poor motivation and training made them unreliable troops, as demonstrated in their defeat by Patriot militia at the Battle of Kettle Creek on February 14, 1779, although this was offset by British victory at Brier Creek on March 3.

In June 1779, Prevost launched an abortive assault on Charleston, before retreating to Savannah, an operation notorious for widespread looting by British troops that enraged both Loyalists and Patriots. In October, a joint French and American operation under d'Estaing and General Benjamin Lincoln failed to recapture Savannah. Prevost was replaced by Lord Cornwallis, who assumed responsibility for Germain's strategy; he soon realized estimates of Loyalist support were considerably over-stated, and he needed far more regular forces.

Reinforced by Clinton, Cornwallis's troops captured Charleston in May 1780, inflicting the most serious Patriot defeat of the war; over 5,000 prisoners were taken and the Continental Army in the south was effectively destroyed. On May 29, Lieutenant-Colonel Banastre Tarleton's mainly Loyalist force routed a Continental Army force nearly three times its size under Colonel Abraham Buford at the Battle of Waxhaws. The battle is controversial for allegations of a massacre, which were later used as a recruiting tool by the Patriots.

Clinton returned to New York, leaving Cornwallis to oversee the south; despite their success, the two men left barely on speaking terms. The Southern strategy depended on local support, but this was undermined by a series of coercive measures. Previously, captured Patriots were sent home after swearing not to take up arms against the king; they were now required to fight their former comrades, while the confiscation of Patriot-owned plantations led formerly neutral "grandees" to side with them. Skirmishes at Williamson's Plantation, Cedar Springs, Rocky Mount, and Hanging Rock signaled widespread resistance to the new oaths throughout South Carolina.

In July 1780, Congress appointed Gates commander in the south; he was defeated at the Battle of Camden on August 16, leaving Cornwallis free to enter North Carolina. Despite battlefield success, the British could not control the countryside and Patriot attacks continued; before moving north, Cornwallis sent Loyalist militia under Major Patrick Ferguson to cover his left flank, leaving their forces too far apart to provide mutual support. In early October, Ferguson was defeated at the Battle of Kings Mountain, dispersing organized Loyalist resistance in the region. Despite this, Cornwallis continued into North Carolina hoping for Loyalist support, while Washington replaced Gates with General Nathanael Greene in December 1780.

Greene divided his army, leading his main force southeast pursued by Cornwallis; a detachment was sent southwest under Daniel Morgan, who defeated Tarleton's British Legion at Cowpens on January 17, 1781, nearly eliminating it as a fighting force. The Patriots now held the initiative in the south, with the exception of a raid on Richmond led by Benedict Arnold in January 1781. Greene led Cornwallis on a series of countermarches around North Carolina; by early March, the British were exhausted and short of supplies and Greene felt strong enough to fight the Battle of Guilford Court House on March 15. Although victorious, Cornwallis suffered heavy casualties and retreated to Wilmington, North Carolina, seeking supplies and reinforcements.

The Patriots now controlled most of the Carolinas and Georgia outside the coastal areas; after a minor reversal at the Battle of Hobkirk's Hill, they captured Fort Balfour on April 13 and recaptured Fort Watson and Fort Motte on April 15. On June 6, Brigadier General Andrew Pickens captured Augusta, leaving the British in Georgia confined to Charleston and Savannah. The assumption Loyalists would do most of the fighting left the British short of troops and battlefield victories came at the cost of losses they could not replace. Despite halting Greene's advance at the Battle of Eutaw Springs on September 8, Cornwallis withdrew to Charleston with little to show for his campaign.

=== Western campaign ===
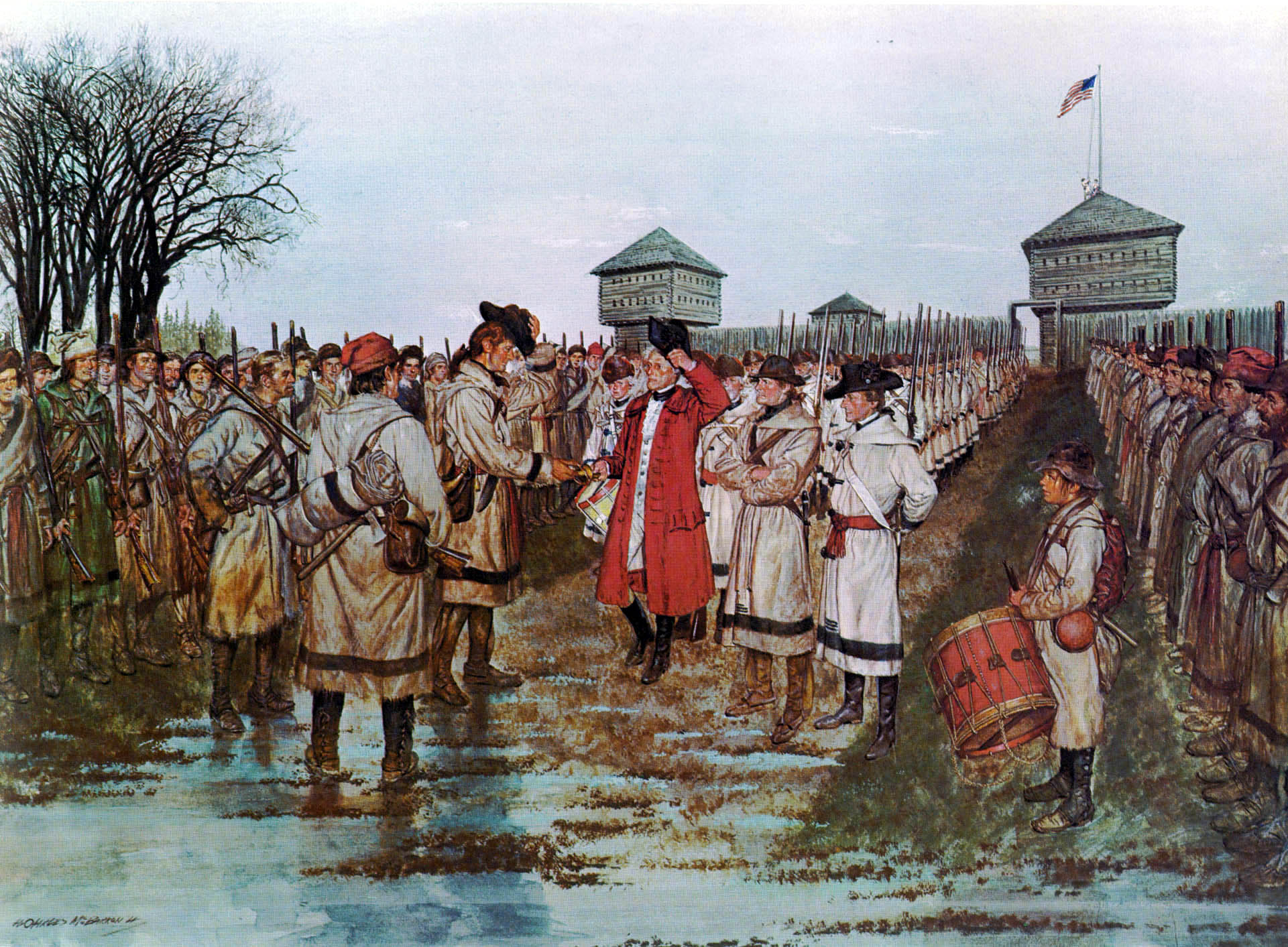
Province of Quebec Governor Henry Hamilton surrenders to Colonel George Rogers Clark at Vincennes in February 1779.

From the beginning of the war, Bernardo de Gálvez, the Governor of Spanish Louisiana, allowed the Americans to import supplies and munitions into New Orleans, then ship them to Pittsburgh. This provided an alternative transportation route for the Continental Army, bypassing the British blockade of the Atlantic Coast.

In February 1778, an expedition of militia to destroy British military supplies in settlements along the Cuyahoga River was halted by adverse weather. Later in the year, a second campaign was undertaken to seize the Illinois Country from the British. Virginia militia, Canadien settlers, and Indian allies commanded by Colonel George Rogers Clark captured Kaskaskia on July 4 and then secured Vincennes, though Vincennes was recaptured by Quebec Governor Henry Hamilton. The Spanish-aligned fur trader Francis Vigo, an American sympathizer, alerted Clark to the threat posed to his control of the west by Hamilton's position and in early 1779, the Virginians counter-attacked in the siege of Fort Vincennes and took Hamilton prisoner. Clark secured western British Quebec as the American Northwest Territory in the Treaty of Paris as the Revolutionary War came to an end.

When Spain joined France's war against Britain in the Anglo-French War in 1779, their treaty specifically excluded Spanish military action in North America. Later that year, however, Gálvez initiated offensive operations against British outposts. First, he cleared British garrisons in Baton Rouge, Louisiana, Fort Bute, and Natchez, Mississippi, and captured five forts. In doing so, Gálvez opened navigation on the Mississippi River north to the American settlement in Pittsburgh.

On May 25, 1780, British Colonel Henry Bird invaded Kentucky as part of a wider operation to clear American resistance from Quebec to the Gulf Coast. Their advance on New Orleans was repelled by Spanish Governor Gálvez's offensive on Mobile. Simultaneous British attacks were repulsed on St. Louis by the Spanish Lieutenant Governor de Leyba, and on the Virginia County courthouse in Cahokia, Illinois, by Lieutenant Colonel Clark. The British initiative under Bird from Detroit was ended at the rumored approach of Clark. (Note: Bird's expedition numbered 150 British soldiers, several hundred Loyalists, and 700 Shawnee, Wyandot, and Ottawa auxiliaries. The force skirted into the eastern regions of Patriot-conquered western Quebec that had been annexed as Illinois County, Virginia. His target was Virginia militia stationed at Lexington. As they approached downriver on the Ohio River, rumor among the natives spread that the feared Colonel Clark had discovered their approach. Bird's natives and Loyalists abandoned their mission 90 miles upriver to loot settlements at the Licking River. At the surrender of Ruddles Station, safe passage to families was promised, but 200 were massacred by Indian raiders. Grenier maintains that "The slaughter the Indians and rangers perpetrated was unprecedented".) The scale of violence in the Licking River Valley, was extreme "even for frontier standards." It led to English and German settlements, who joined Clark's militia when the British and their hired German soldiers withdrew to the Great Lakes. The Americans responded with a major offensive along the Mad River in August which met with some success in the Battle of Piqua but did not end Indian raids.

French soldier Augustin de La Balme led a Canadian militia in an attempt to capture Detroit, but they dispersed when Miami natives led by Little Turtle attacked the encamped settlers on November 5. (Note: Most Native Americans living in the area remembered the French better than any of the British they had met. Despite the British military nearby, the Miami people sought to avoid fighting with either Virginian Clark or Frenchman La Balme. On La Balme's horseback advance on Detroit, he paused two weeks to ruin a local French trader and loot surrounding Miami towns. La Balme might have treated them as allies, but he pushed Little Turtle into warrior leadership, converting most Miami tribes into British military allies, and launching the military career of one of the most successful opponents of westward settlement over the next 30 years.) The war in the west stalemated with the British garrison sitting in Detroit and the Virginians expanding westward settlements north of the Ohio River in the face of British-allied Indian resistance.

In 1781, Galvez and Pollock campaigned east along the Gulf Coast to secure West Florida, including British-held Mobile and Pensacola. The Spanish operations impaired the British supply of armaments to British Indian allies, which effectively suspended a military alliance to attack settlers between the Mississippi River and the Appalachian Mountains. (Note: Governor Bernardo de Gálvez is only one of eight men made honorary US citizens for his service in the American Cause. see Bridget Bowman (29 December 2014). "Bernardo de Gálvez y Madrid's Very Good Year". Roll Call. The Economist Group. Retrieved April 25, 2020.)

In 1782, large scale retaliations between settlers and Native Americans in the region included the Gnadenhutten massacre and the Crawford expedition. The 1782 Battle of Blue Licks was one of the last major engagements of the war. News of the treaty between Great Britain and the United States arrived late that year. By this time, about 7% of Kentucky settlers had been killed in battles against Native Americans, contrasted with 1% of the population killed in the Thirteen Colonies. Lingering resentments led to continued fighting in the west after the war officially ended.

=== British defeat ===
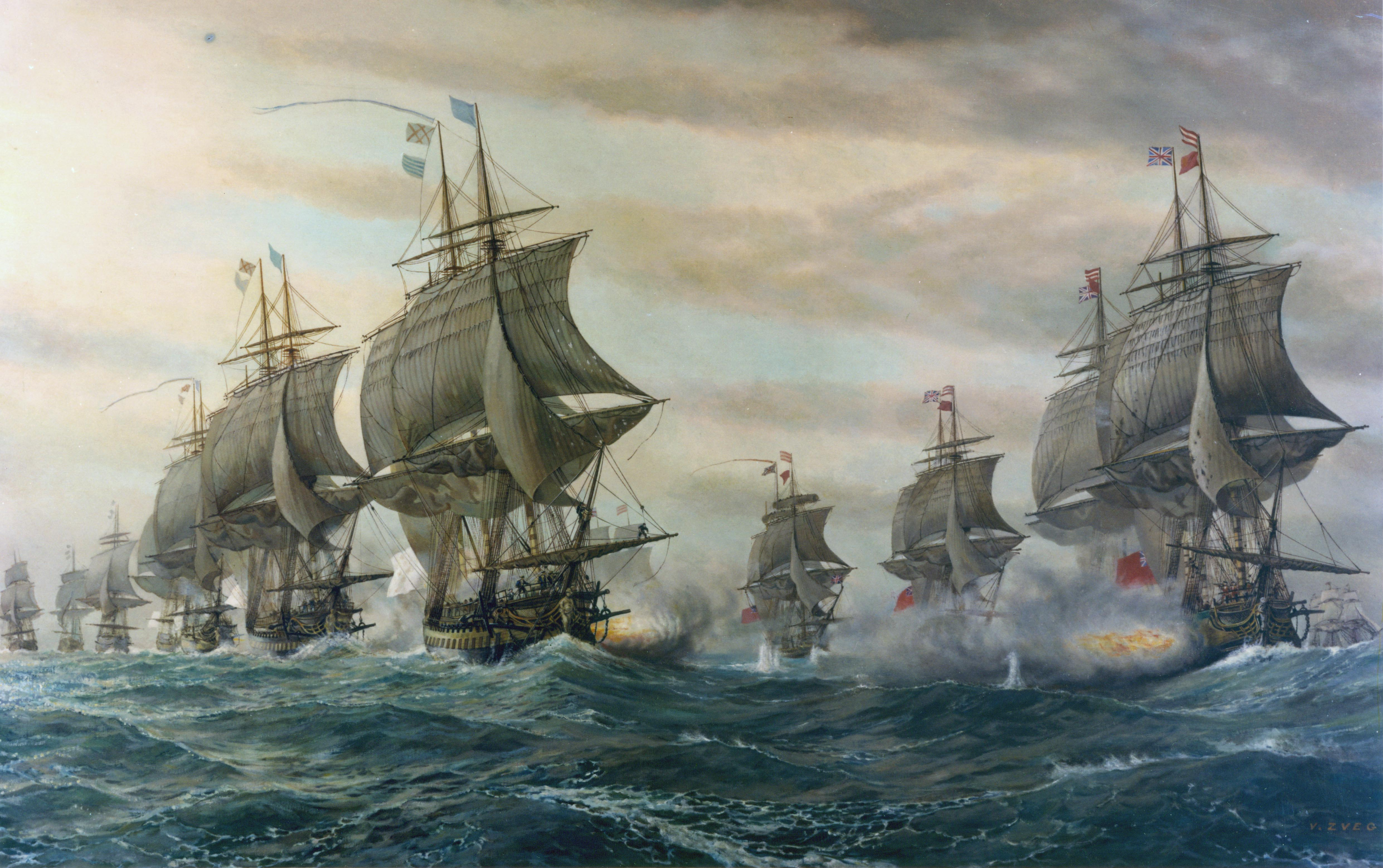
A French Navy fleet (left) engages the British in the Battle of the Chesapeake on September 5, 1781.

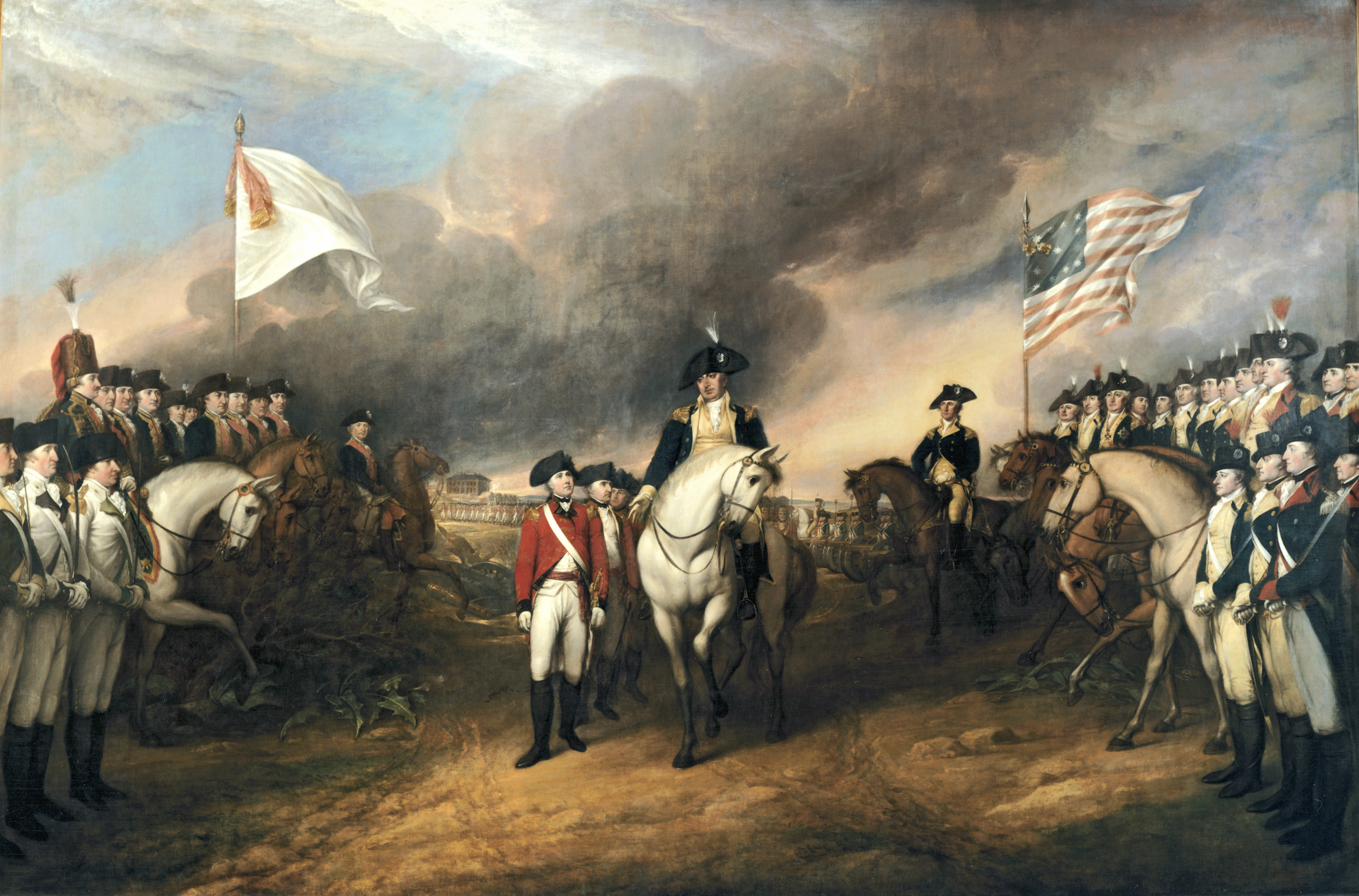
British general Cornwallis surrenders at Yorktown in October 1781.

Clinton spent most of 1781 based in New York City; he failed to construct a coherent operational strategy, partly due to his difficult relationship with Admiral Marriot Arbuthnot. In Charleston, Cornwallis independently developed an aggressive plan for a campaign in Virginia, which he hoped would isolate Greene's army in the Carolinas and cause the collapse of Patriot resistance in the South. This strategy was approved by Lord Germain in London, but neither informed Clinton.

Washington and Rochambeau discussed their options: Washington wanted to attack the British in New York, and Rochambeau wanted to attack them in Virginia, where Cornwallis's forces were less established. Washington eventually gave way, and Lafayette took a combined Franco-American force into Virginia. Clinton misinterpreted his movements as preparations for an attack on New York and instructed Cornwallis to establish a fortified sea base, where the Royal Navy could evacuate British troops to help defend New York.

When Lafayette entered Virginia, Cornwallis complied with Clinton's orders and withdrew to Yorktown, where he constructed strong defenses and awaited evacuation. An agreement by the Spanish Navy to defend the French West Indies allowed Admiral François Joseph Paul de Grasse to relocate to the Atlantic seaboard, a move Arbuthnot did not anticipate. This provided Lafayette naval support, while the failure of previous combined operations at Newport and Savannah meant their coordination was planned more carefully. Despite repeated urging from his subordinates, Cornwallis made no attempt to engage Lafayette before he could establish siege lines. Expecting to be withdrawn within a few days, he also abandoned the outer defenses, which were promptly occupied by the besiegers and hastened British defeat.

On August 31, a Royal Navy fleet under Thomas Graves left New York for Yorktown. After landing troops and munitions for the besiegers on August 30, de Grasse remained in Chesapeake Bay and intercepted him on September 5; although the Battle of the Chesapeake was indecisive in terms of losses, Graves was forced to retreat, leaving Cornwallis isolated. An attempted breakout over the York River at Gloucester Point failed due to bad weather. Under heavy bombardment with dwindling supplies, on October 16 Cornwallis sent emissaries to General Washington to negotiate surrender; after twelve hours of negotiations, the terms of surrender were finalized the following day. Responsibility for defeat was the subject of fierce public debate between Cornwallis, Clinton, and Germain. Clinton ultimately took most of the blame and spent the rest of his life in relative obscurity.

Subsequent to Yorktown, American forces were assigned to supervise the armistice between Washington and Clinton made to facilitate British departure following the January 1782 law of Parliament forbidding any further British offensive action in North America. British-American negotiations in Paris led to signed preliminary agreements in November 1782, which acknowledged US independence. The enacted Congressional war objective, a British withdrawal from North America and cession of these regions to the US, was completed in stages in East Coast cities.

In the US South, Generals Greene and Wayne observed the British removing their troops from Charleston on December 14, 1782. Loyalist provincial militias of whites and free Blacks and Loyalists with slaves were transported to Nova Scotia and the British West Indies. (Note: In Nova Scotia, a province that had been a Massachusetts county in the 1600s, British settlement of freed black Loyalists from the American Revolutionary War secured its Canadian claim there. Britain continued its last "Bourbon War" with the French and Spanish primarily amidst their mutually conflicting territorial claims adjacent the Caribbean Sea, including Jamaica, adjacent the Mediterranean Sea including Gibraltar and Isla Mallorca, and adjacent the Indian Ocean during the Second Mysore War.) Native American allies of the British and some freed Blacks were left to escape unaided through the American lines.

On April 9, 1783, Washington issued orders that "all acts of hostility" were to cease immediately. That same day, by arrangement with Washington, Carleton issued a similar order to British troops. As directed by a Congressional resolution of May 26, 1783, all non-commissioned officers and enlisted were furloughed "to their homes" until the "definitive treaty of peace", when they would be automatically discharged. The US armies were directly disbanded in the field as of Washington's General Orders on June 2, 1783. Once the Treaty of Paris was signed with Britain on September 3, 1783, Washington resigned as commander-in-chief of the Continental Army. The last British occupation of New York City ended on November 25, 1783, with the departure of Clinton's replacement, General Sir Guy Carleton.

== Strategy and commanders ==
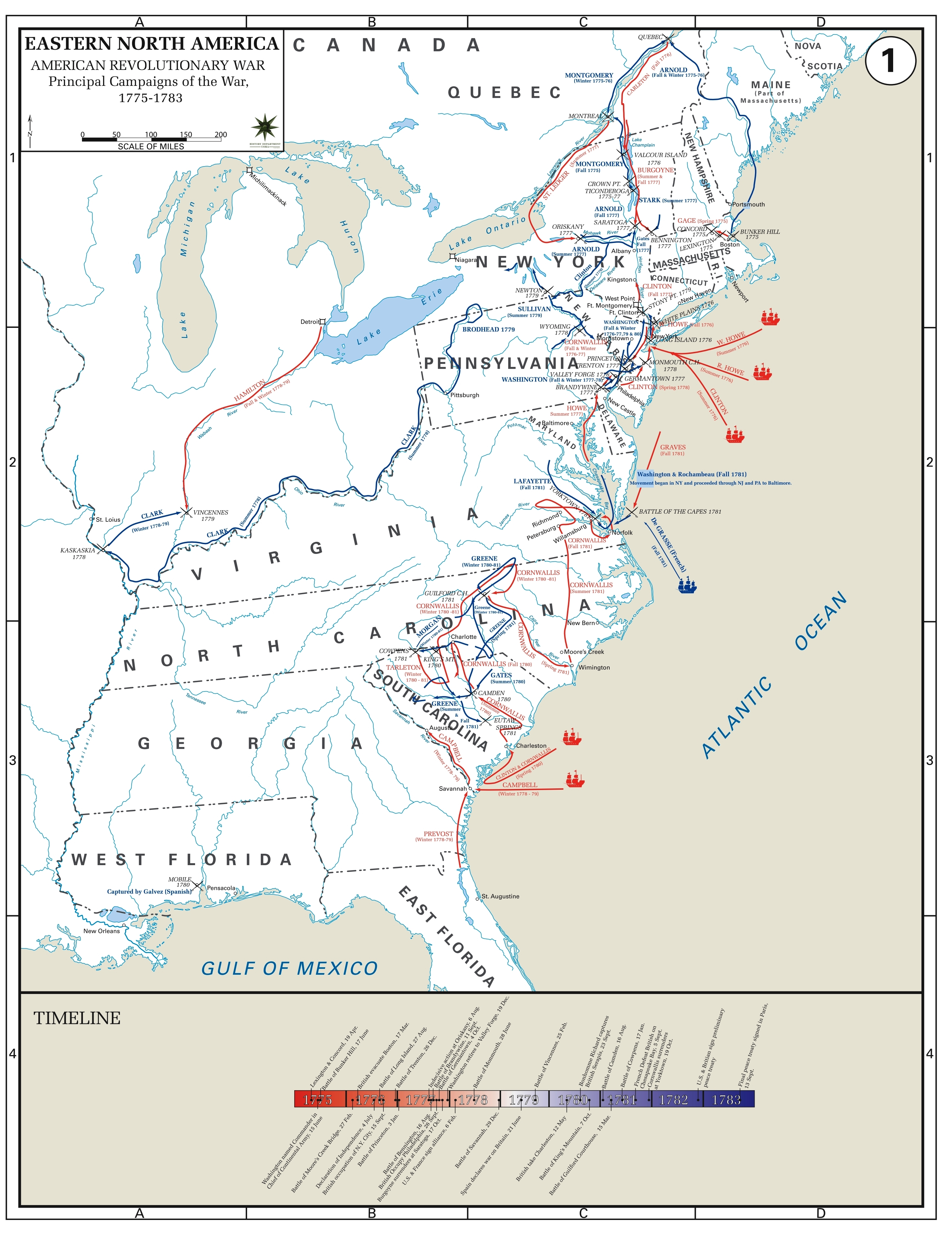
A map of principal campaigns in the American Revolutionary War with British movements in red and American movements in blue; the timeline shows the British won most battles in the war's first half, but Americans won the most in the second.

To win their insurrection, Washington and the Continental Army needed to outlast the British will to fight. To restore the territory of British America, the British had to defeat the Continental Army quickly and compel the Second Continental Congress to retract its claim to self-governance. Historian Terry M. Mays of The Citadel identifies three separate types of warfare during the Revolutionary War. The first was a colonial conflict in which objections to imperial trade regulation were as significant as taxation policy. The second was a civil war between American Patriots, American Loyalists, and those who preferred to remain neutral. Particularly in the south, many battles were fought between Patriots and Loyalists with no British involvement, leading to divisions that continued after independence was achieved.

The third element was a global war between France, Spain, the Dutch Republic, and Britain, with America serving as one of several different war theaters. After entering the Revolutionary War in 1778, France provided the Americans money, weapons, soldiers, and naval assistance, while French troops fought under US command in North America. While Spain did not formally join the war in America, they provided access to the Mississippi River and captured British possessions on the Gulf of Mexico that denied bases to the Royal Navy, retook Menorca and besieged Gibraltar in Europe. Although the Dutch Republic was no longer a major power prior to 1774, they still dominated the European carrying trade, and Dutch merchants made large profits by shipping French-supplied munitions to the Patriots. This ended when Britain declared war in December 1780, and the conflict proved disastrous to the Dutch economy.

=== American strategy ===
The Americans stood to benefit if the Continental Army remained intact and the armed conflict became a protracted war. British supply lines were long, replacement of troops difficult, and the war was expensive. Colonial populations were largely prosperous and depended on local production for food and supplies rather than on imports from Britain. The thirteen colonies were spread across most of North American Atlantic seaboard, stretching 1,000 miles. Most colonial farms were remote from the seaports, and control of four or five major ports did not give Britain control over American inland areas. Each state had established internal distribution systems. Motivation was also a major asset: each colonial capital had its own newspapers and printers, and the Patriots enjoyed more popular support than the Loyalists. Britain hoped that the Loyalists would do much of the fighting, but found that the Loyalists did not engage as significantly as they had hoped.

==== Continental Army ====
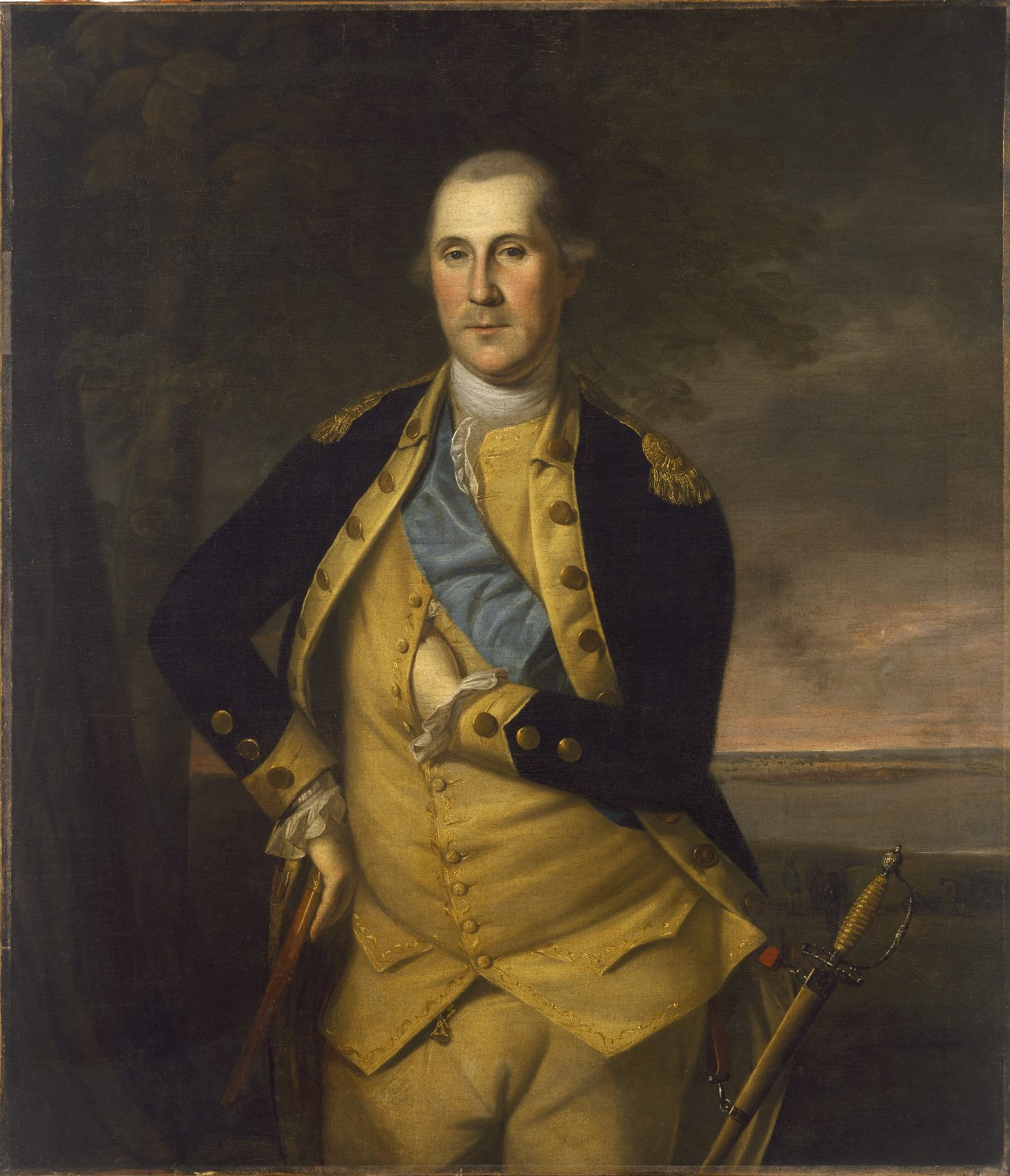
1776 portrait of Washington by Charles Willson Peale, now housed in the Brooklyn Museum

When the Revolutionary War began, the Second Continental Congress lacked a professional army or navy. However, each of the colonies had a long-established system of local militia, which were combat-tested in support of British regulars in the French and Indian War. The colonial state legislatures independently funded and controlled their local militias.

Militiamen were lightly armed, had little training, and usually did not have uniforms. Their units served for only a few weeks or months at a time and lacked the training and discipline of more experienced soldiers. Local county militias were reluctant to travel far from home and were unavailable for extended operations. To compensate for this, the Continental Congress established a regular force known as the Continental Army on June 14, 1775, which proved to be the origin of the modern United States Army, and appointed Washington as its commander-in-chief. However, it suffered significantly from the lack of an effective training program and from largely inexperienced officers. Each state legislature appointed officers for both county and state militias and their regimental Continental line officers; although Washington was required to accept Congressional appointments, he was permitted to choose and command his own generals, such as Greene; his chief of artillery, Knox; and Alexander Hamilton, the chief of staff. One of Washington's most successful general officer recruits was Steuben, a veteran of the Prussian general staff who wrote the Revolutionary War Drill Manual. The development of the Continental Army was always a work in progress and Washington used both his regulars and state militias throughout the war; when properly employed, the combination allowed them to overwhelm smaller British forces, as they did in battles at Concord, Boston, Bennington, and Saratoga. Both sides used partisan warfare, but the state militias effectively suppressed Loyalist activity when British regulars were not in the area. (Note: Three branches of the United States Military trace their roots to the American Revolutionary War; the Army comes from the Continental Army; the Navy comes from the Continental Navy, appointing Esek Hopkins as the Navy's first commander. The Marine Corps links to the Continental Marines, created by Congress on November 10, 1775.)

Washington designed the overall military strategy in cooperation with Congress, established the principle of civilian supremacy in military affairs, personally recruited his senior officer corps, and kept the states focused on a common goal. Washington initially employed the inexperienced officers and untrained troops in Fabian strategies rather than risk frontal assaults against Britain's professional forces. Over the course of the war, Washington lost more battles than he won, but he never surrendered his troops and maintained a fighting force in the face of British field armies.

By prevailing European standards, the armies in America were relatively small, limited by lack of supplies and logistics. The British were constrained by the logistical difficulty of transporting troops across the Atlantic and their dependence on local supplies. Washington never directly commanded more than 17,000 men, and the combined Franco-American army in the decisive American victory at Yorktown was only about 19,000. At the beginning of 1776, Patriot forces consisted of 20,000 men, with two-thirds in the Continental Army and the other third in the state militias. About 250,000 American men served as regulars or as militia for the revolutionary cause during the war, but there were never more than 90,000 men under arms at any time.

On the whole, American officers never equaled their British opponents in tactics and maneuvers, and they lost most of the pitched battles. The great successes at Boston (1776), Saratoga (1777), and Yorktown (1781) were won by trapping the British far from base with a greater number of troops. After 1778, Washington's army was transformed into a more disciplined and effective force, mostly as a product of Baron von Steuben's military training. Immediately after the Continental Army emerged from Valley Forge in June 1778, it proved its ability to match the military capabilities of the British at the Battle of Monmouth, including a Black Rhode Island regiment fending off a British bayonet attack and then counter charging the British for the first time as part of Washington's army. After the Battle of Monmouth, Washington came to realize that saving entire towns was not necessary, but preserving his army and keeping the revolutionary spirit alive was more important. Washington informed Henry Laurens, then president of the Second Continental Congress, (Note: Laurens was president of the Second Continental Congress at this time.) "that the possession of our towns, while we have an army in the field, will avail them little."

Although the Continental Congress was responsible for the war effort and provided supplies to the troops, Washington took it upon himself to pressure Congress and the state legislatures to provide the essentials of war; there was never nearly enough. Congress evolved in its committee oversight and established the Board of War, which included members of the military. Because the Board of War was also a committee ensnared with its own internal procedures, Congress also created the post of Secretary of War, appointing Major General Benjamin Lincoln to the position in February 1781. Washington worked closely with Lincoln to coordinate civilian and military authorities and took charge of training and supplying the army.

==== Continental Navy ====
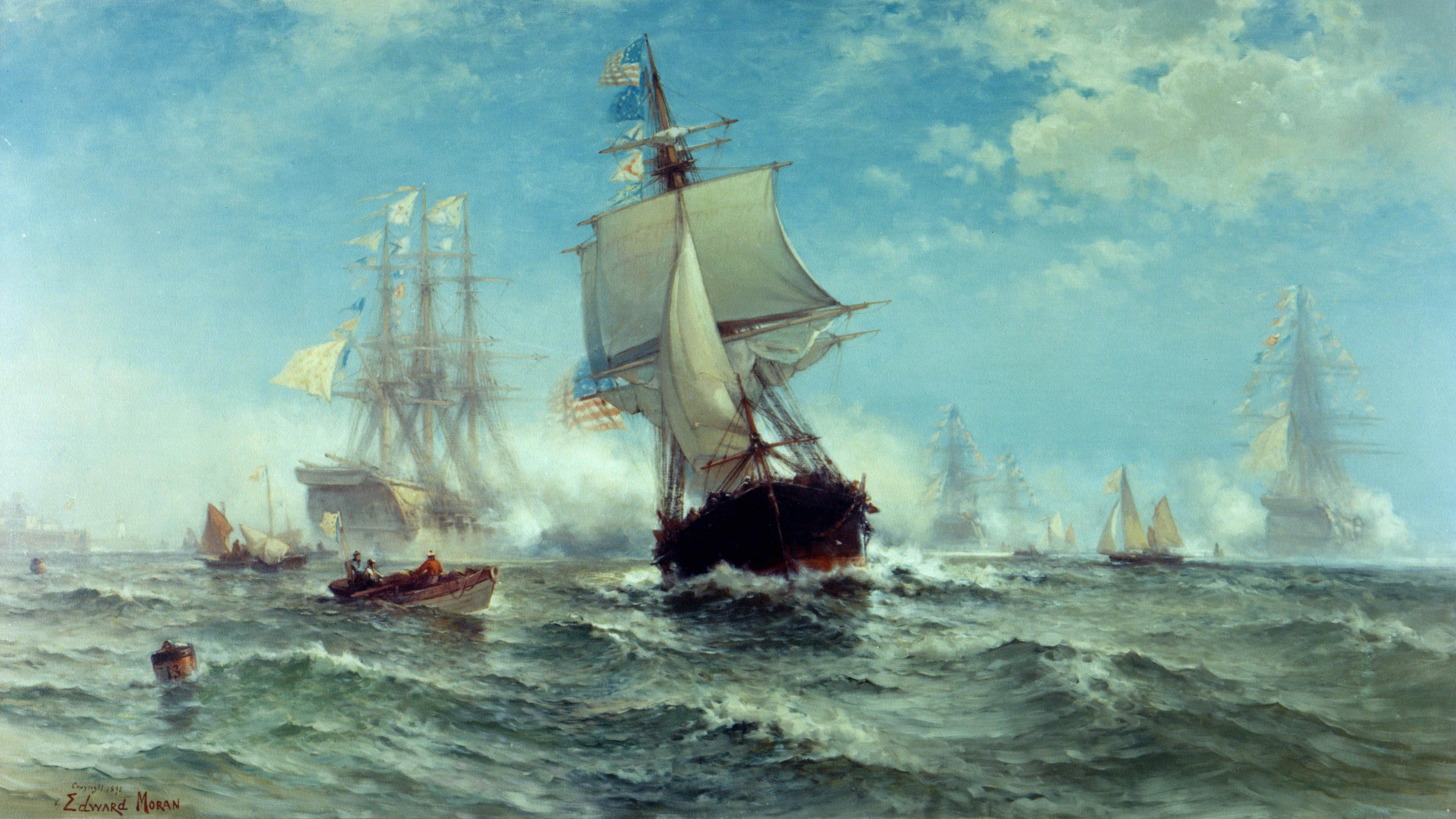
USS Ranger commanded by Captain John Paul Jones

During the first summer of the war, Washington began outfitting schooners and other small seagoing vessels to prey on ships supplying the British in Boston. The Second Continental Congress established the Continental Navy on October 13, 1775, and appointed Esek Hopkins as its first commander; for most of the war, the Continental Navy included only a handful of small frigates and sloops, supported by privateers. On November 10, 1775, Congress authorized the creation of the Continental Marines, which ultimately evolved into the United States Marine Corps.

John Paul Jones became the first American naval hero when he captured HMS Drake on April 24, 1778, the first victory for any American military vessel in British waters. The last such victory was by the frigate USS Alliance, commanded by Captain John Barry. On March 10, 1783, the Alliance outgunned HMS Sybil in a 45-minute duel while escorting Spanish gold from Havana to the Congress in Philadelphia. After Yorktown, all US Navy ships were sold or given away; it was the first time in America's history that it had no fighting forces on the high seas.

Congress primarily commissioned privateers to reduce costs and to take advantage of the large proportion of colonial sailors found in the British Empire. In total, they included 1,700 ships that successfully captured 2,283 enemy ships to damage the British effort and to enrich themselves with the proceeds from the sale of cargo and the ship itself. (Note: In what was known as the Whaleboat War, American privateers mainly from New Jersey, Brooklyn, and Connecticut attacked and robbed British merchant ships and raided and robbed coastal communities of Long Island reputed to have Loyalist sympathies.) About 55,000 sailors served aboard American privateers during the war.

=== France ===
At the beginning of the war, the Americans had no major international allies, since most nation-states waited to see how the conflict unfolded. Over time, the Continental Army established its military credibility. Battles such as the Battle of Bennington, the Battles of Saratoga, and even defeats such as the Battle of Germantown, proved decisive in gaining the support of powerful European nations, including France, Spain, and the Dutch Republic; the Dutch moved from covertly supplying the Americans with weapons and supplies to overtly supporting them.

The decisive American victory at Saratoga convinced France, which was already a long-time rival of Britain, to offer the Americans the Treaty of Amity and Commerce. The two nations also agreed to a defensive Treaty of Alliance to protect their trade and also guaranteed American independence from Britain. To engage the United States as a French ally militarily, the treaty was conditioned on Britain initiating a war on France to stop it from trading with the US. Spain and the Dutch Republic were invited to join by both France and the United States in the treaty, but neither was responsive to the request.

On June 13, 1778, France declared war on Great Britain, and it invoked the French military alliance with the US, which ensured additional US private support for French possessions in the Caribbean. (Note: King George III feared that the war's prospects would make it unlikely he could reclaim the North American colonies. During the later years of the Revolution, the British were drawn into numerous other conflicts about the globe.) Washington worked closely with the soldiers and navy that France would send to America, primarily through Lafayette on his staff. French assistance made critical contributions required to defeat Cornwallis at Yorktown in 1781. (Note: The final elements for US victory over Britain and US independence was assured by direct military intervention from France, as well as ongoing French supply and commercial trade over the final three years of the war.)

=== British strategy ===
The British military had considerable experience fighting in North America. However, in previous conflicts they benefited from local logistics and support from the colonial militia. In the American Revolutionary War, reinforcements had to come from Europe, and maintaining large armies over such distances was extremely complex; ships could take three months to cross the Atlantic, and orders from London were often outdated by the time they arrived.

Prior to the conflict, the colonies were largely autonomous economic and political entities, with no centralized area of ultimate strategic importance. This meant that, unlike Europe where the fall of a capital city often ended wars, that in America continued even after the loss of major settlements such as Philadelphia, the seat of Congress, New York, and Charleston. British power was reliant on the Royal Navy, whose dominance allowed them to resupply their own expeditionary forces while preventing access to enemy ports. However, the majority of the American population was agrarian, rather than urban; supported by the French navy and blockade runners based in the Dutch Caribbean, their economy was able to survive. Lord North, Prime Minister since 1770, delegated control of the war in North America to Lord George Germain and the Earl of Sandwich, who was head of the Royal Navy from 1771 to 1782. Defeat at Saratoga in 1777 made it clear the revolt would not be easily suppressed, especially after the Franco-American alliance of February 1778. With Spain also expected to join the conflict, the Royal Navy needed to prioritize either the war in America or in Europe; Germain advocated the former, Sandwich the latter.

North initially backed the Southern strategy attempting to exploit divisions between the mercantile north and slave-owning south, but after the defeat of Yorktown, he was forced to accept that this policy had failed. It was clear the war was lost, although the Royal Navy forced the French to relocate their fleet to the Caribbean in November 1781 and resumed a close blockade of American trade. The resulting economic damage and rising inflation meant the US was now eager to end the war, while France was unable to provide further loans; Congress could no longer pay its soldiers. The geographical size of the colonies and limited manpower meant the British could not simultaneously conduct military operations and occupy territory without local support. Debate persists over whether their defeat was inevitable; one British statesman described it as "like trying to conquer a map". While Ferling argues Patriot victory was nothing short of a miracle, Ellis suggests the odds always favored the Americans, especially after Howe squandered the chance of a decisive British success in 1776, an "opportunity that would never come again". The US military history speculates the additional commitment of 10,000 fresh troops in 1780 would have placed British victory "within the realm of possibility".

==== British Army ====
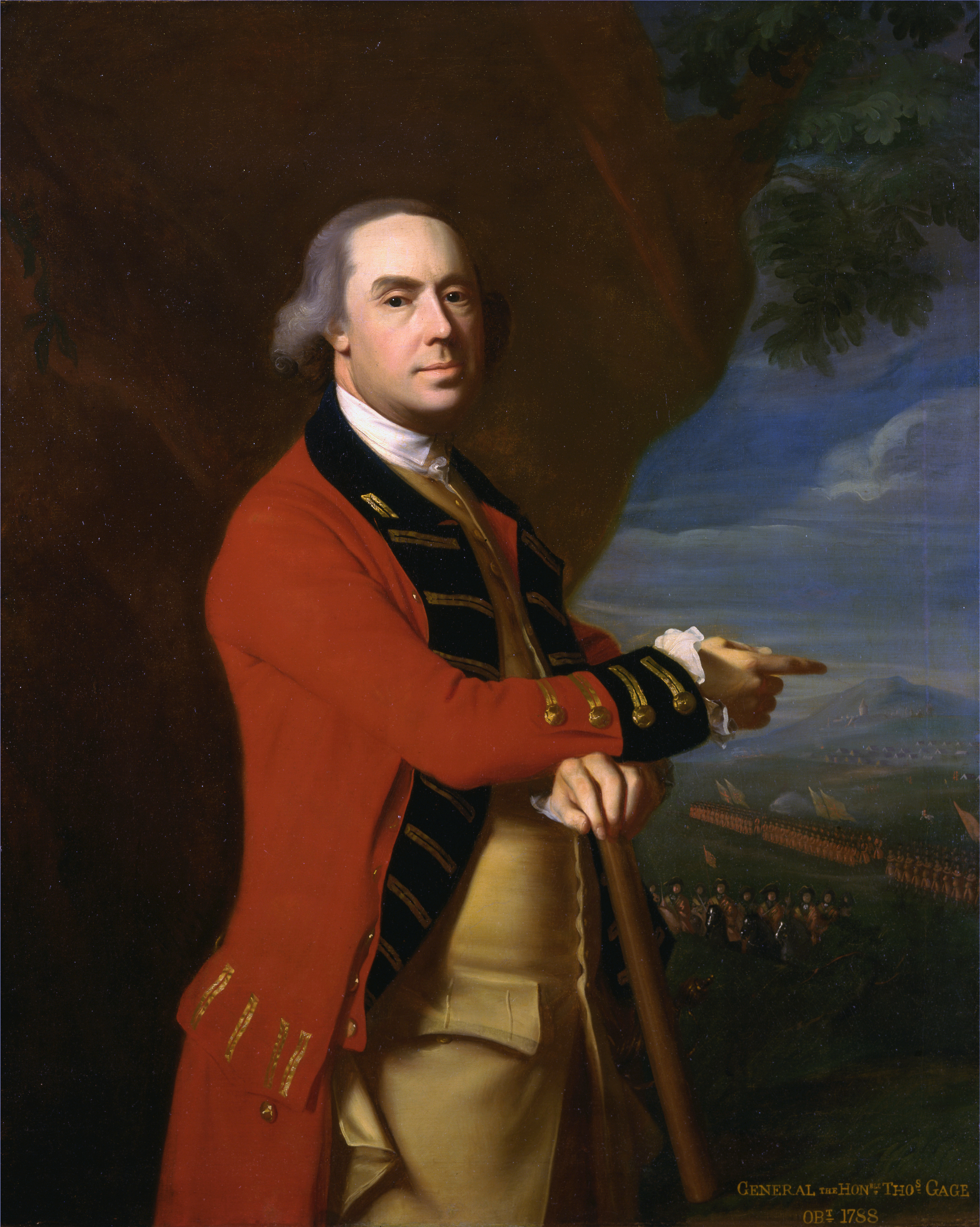
Sir Thomas Gage, British Army Commander from 1763 to 1775

The expulsion of France from North America in 1763 led to a drastic reduction in British troop levels in the colonies; in 1775, there were only 8,500 regular soldiers among a civilian population of 2.8 million. The bulk of military resources in the Americas were focused on defending sugar islands in the Caribbean; Jamaica alone generated more revenue than all thirteen American colonies combined. With the end of the Seven Years' War, the permanent army in Britain was also cut back, which resulted in administrative difficulties when the war began a decade later.

Over the course of the war, there were four separate British commanders-in-chief. The first was Thomas Gage, appointed in 1763, whose initial focus was establishing British rule in former French areas of Canada. Many in London blamed the revolt on his failure to take firm action earlier, and he was relieved after the heavy losses incurred at the Battle of Bunker Hill. His replacement was Sir William Howe, a member of the Whig faction in Parliament who opposed the policy of coercion advocated by Lord North; Cornwallis, who later surrendered at Yorktown, was one of many senior officers who initially refused to serve in North America.

The 1775 campaign showed the British overestimated the capabilities of their own troops and underestimated the colonial militia, requiring a reassessment of tactics and strategy, and allowing the Patriots to take the initiative. Howe's responsibility is still debated; despite receiving large numbers of reinforcements, Bunker Hill seems to have permanently affected his self-confidence and lack of tactical flexibility meant he often failed to follow up opportunities. Many of his decisions were attributed to supply problems, such as his failure to pursue Washington's beaten army. Having lost the confidence of his subordinates, he was recalled after Burgoyne surrendered at Saratoga.

Following the failure of the Carlisle Commission, British policy changed from treating the Patriots as subjects who needed to be reconciled to enemies who had to be defeated. In 1778, Howe was replaced by Sir Henry Clinton. Regarded as an expert on tactics and strategy, like his predecessors Clinton was handicapped by chronic supply issues. In addition, Clinton's strategy was compromised by conflict with political superiors in London and his colleagues in North America, especially Admiral Mariot Arbuthnot, replaced in early 1781 by Rodney. He was neither notified nor consulted when Germain approved Cornwallis's invasion of the south in 1781 and delayed sending him reinforcements believing the bulk of Washington's army was still outside New York City. After the surrender at Yorktown, Clinton was relieved by Carleton, whose major task was to oversee the evacuation of Loyalists and British troops from Savannah, Charleston, and New York City.

==== German troops ====
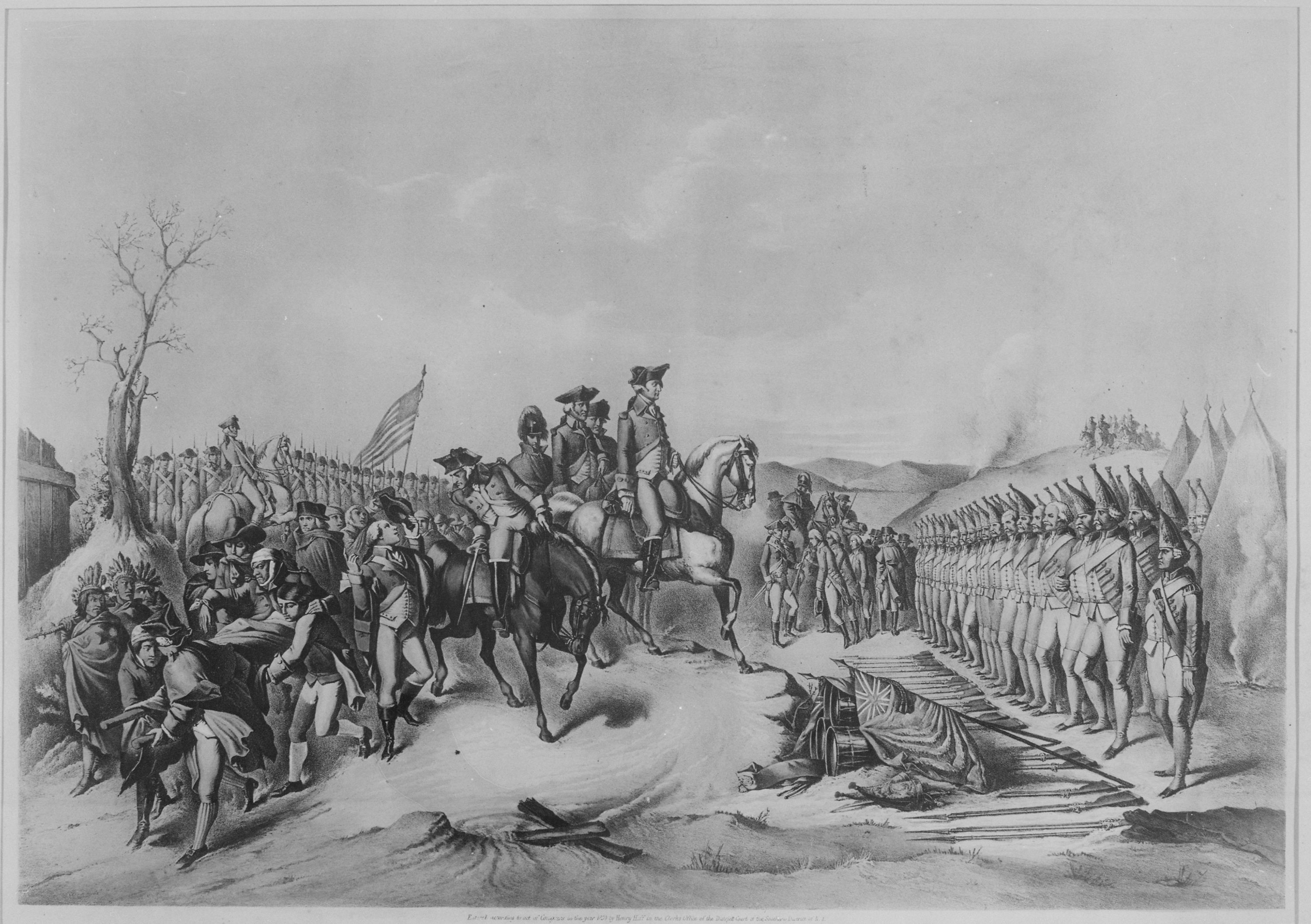
Hessian troops surrender after Washington's victory at the Battle of Trenton in December 1776.

During the 18th century, states commonly hired foreign soldiers, including Britain. When it became clear additional troops were needed to suppress the revolt in America, it was decided to employ professional German soldiers. There were several reasons for this, including public sympathy for the Patriot cause, a historical reluctance to expand the British army and the time needed to recruit and train new regiments. Many smaller states in the Holy Roman Empire had a long tradition of renting their armies to the highest bidder. The most important was Hesse-Kassel, known as "the Mercenary State".

The first supply agreements were signed by the North administration in late 1775; 30,000 Germans served in the American War. Often generically referred to as "Hessians", they included men from many other states, including Hanover and Brunswick. Sir Henry Clinton recommended recruiting Russian troops whom he rated very highly, having seen them in action against the Ottomans; however, negotiations with Catherine the Great made little progress.

Unlike previous wars their use led to intense political debate in Britain, France, and even Germany, where Frederick the Great refused to provide passage through his territories for troops hired for the American war. In March 1776, the agreements were challenged in Parliament by Whigs who objected to "coercion" in general, and the use of foreign soldiers to subdue "British subjects". The debates were covered in detail by American newspapers; in May 1776 they received copies of the treaties themselves, provided by British sympathizers and smuggled into North America from London.

The prospect of foreign German soldiers being used in the colonies bolstered support for independence, more so than taxation and other acts combined; the King was accused of declaring war on his own subjects, leading to the idea there were now two separate governments. By apparently showing Britain was determined to go to war, it made hopes of reconciliation seem naive and hopeless, while the employment of what was regarded as "foreign mercenaries" became one of the charges levelled against George III in the Declaration of Independence. The Hessian reputation within Germany for brutality also increased support for the Patriot cause among German American immigrants.

The presence of over 150,000 German Americans meant both sides felt the German soldiers might be persuaded to desert; one reason Clinton suggested employing Russians was that he felt they were less likely to defect. When the first German troops arrived on Staten Island in August 1776, Congress approved the printing of handbills, promising land and citizenship to any willing to join the Patriot cause. The British launched a counter-campaign claiming deserters could be executed. Desertion among the Germans occurred throughout the war, with the highest rate of desertion occurring between the surrender at Yorktown and the Treaty of Paris. German regiments were central to the British war effort; of the estimated 30,000 sent to America, some 13,000 became casualties.

== Revolution as civil war ==
=== Loyalists ===
American Patriots routed Loyalists at the Battle of Kings Mountain in 1780, raising Patriot morale.

Wealthy American Loyalists convinced the British government that most of the colonists were sympathetic toward the British Crown; consequently, British military planners relied on recruiting Loyalists, but had trouble recruiting sufficient numbers as the Patriots had widespread support. (Note: On militia see Boatner 1974, p. 707; Weigley 1973, ch. 2) Approximately 25,000 Loyalists fought for the British throughout the war. Although Loyalists constituted about twenty percent of the colonial population, they were concentrated in distinct communities. Many of them lived among large plantation owners in the Tidewater region and South Carolina.

When the British began probing the backcountry in 1777–1778, they were faced with a major problem: any significant level of organized Loyalist activity required a continued presence of British regulars. The available manpower that the British had in America was insufficient to protect Loyalist territory and counter American offensives. The Loyalist militias in the South were constantly defeated by neighboring Patriot militia. The Patriot victory at the Battle of Kings Mountain irreversibly impaired Loyalist militia capability in the South.

When the early war policy was administered by Howe, the Crown's need to maintain Loyalist support prevented it from using the traditional revolt suppression methods. The British cause suffered when their troops ransacked local homes during an aborted attack on Charleston in 1779 that enraged both Patriots and Loyalists. After Congress rejected the Carlisle Peace Commission in 1778 and Westminster turned to "hard war" during Clinton's command, neutral colonists in the Carolinas often allied with the Patriots. Conversely, Loyalists gained support when Patriots intimidated suspected Tories by destroying property or tarring and feathering.

A Loyalist militia unit—the British Legion—provided some of the best troops in British service. It was commanded by Tarleton and gained a fearsome reputation in the colonies for "brutality and needless slaughter".

=== Women ===
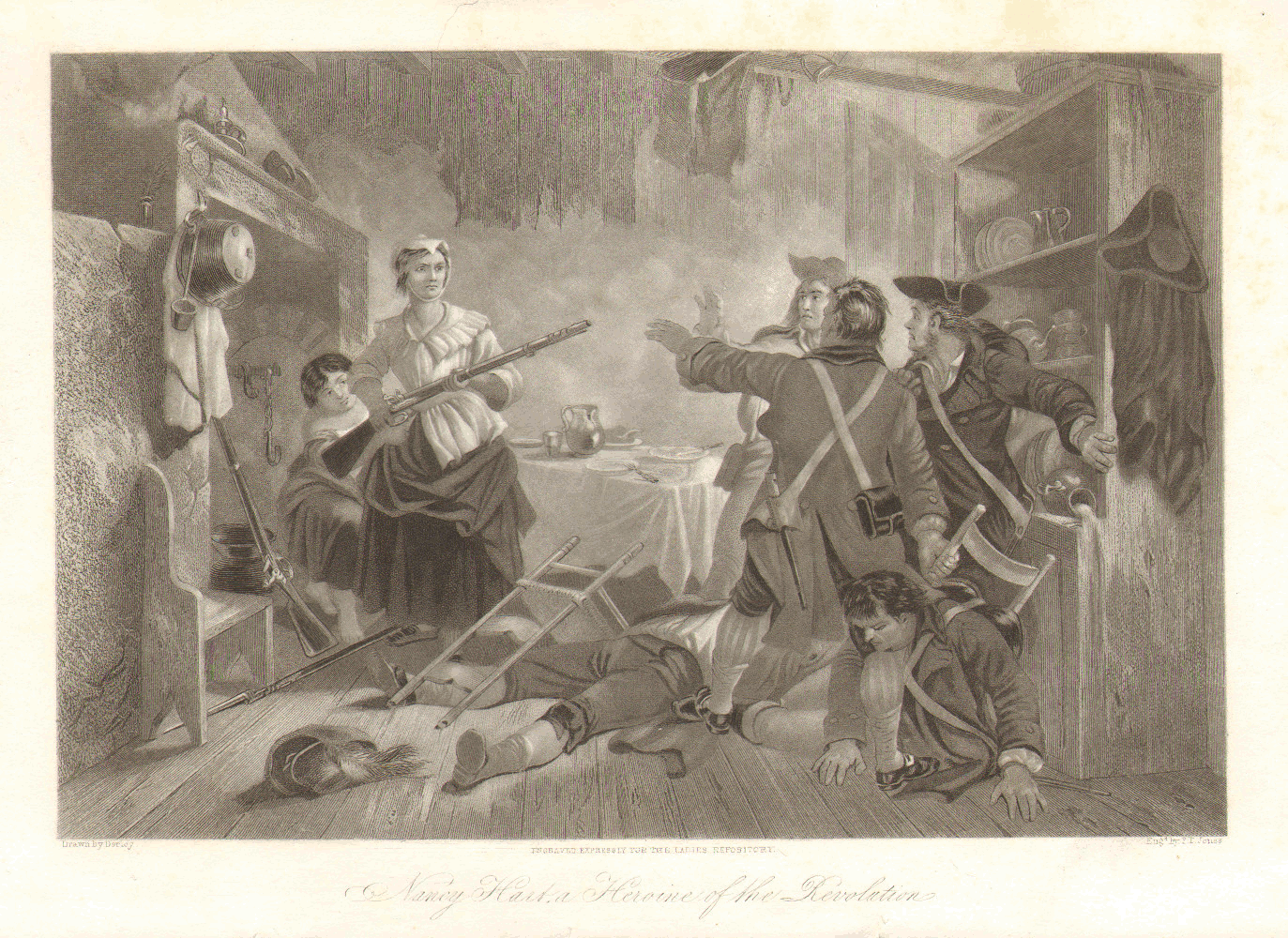
Nancy Hart single-handedly captured six Loyalist soldiers who barged into her home intending to ransack it.

Women played various roles during the Revolutionary War; they often accompanied their husbands when permitted. For example, throughout the war Martha Washington was known to visit and provide aid to her husband George at various American camps. Women often accompanied armies as camp followers to sell goods and perform necessary tasks in hospitals and camps, and numbered in the thousands during the war.

Women also assumed military roles: some dressed as men to directly support combat, fight, or act as spies on both sides. Anna Maria Lane joined her husband in the Army. The Virginia General Assembly later cited her bravery: she fought while dressed as a man and "performed extraordinary military services, and received a severe wound at the battle of Germantown ... with the courage of a soldier". On April 26, 1777, Sybil Ludington is said to have ridden to alert militia forces to the British's approach; she has been called the "female Paul Revere". Whether the ride occurred is questioned. A few others disguised themselves as men. Deborah Sampson fought until her gender was discovered and she was discharged as a result; Sally St. Clair was killed in action.

=== African Americans ===
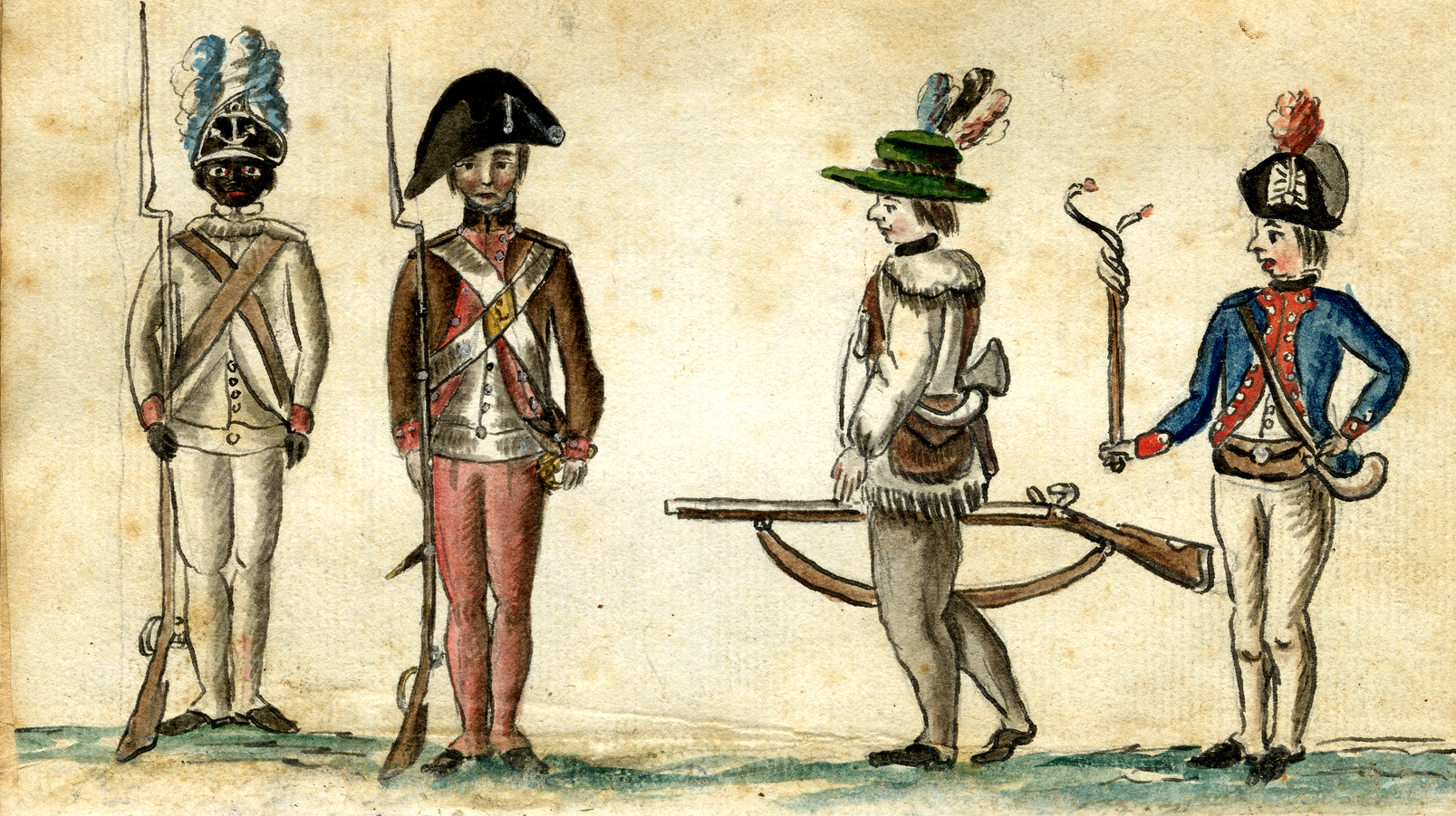
Continental Army soldiers, including one from the 1st Rhode Island Regiment on the left

When war began, the population of the Thirteen Colonies included an estimated 500,000 slaves, predominantly used as labor on Southern plantations. In November 1775, Lord Dunmore, the royal governor of Virginia, issued a proclamation that promised freedom to any Patriot-owned slaves willing to bear arms. Although the announcement helped to fill a temporary manpower shortage, white Loyalist prejudice meant recruits were eventually redirected to non-combatant roles. The Loyalists' motive was to deprive Patriot planters of labor rather than to end slavery; Loyalist-owned slaves were returned.

The 1779 Philipsburg Proclamation issued by Clinton extended the offer of freedom to Patriot-owned slaves throughout the colonies. It persuaded entire families to escape to British lines, many of which were employed growing food for the army by removing the requirement for military service. While Clinton organized the Black Pioneers, he also ensured fugitive slaves were returned to Loyalist owners with orders that they were not to be punished. As the war progressed, service as regular soldiers in British units became increasingly common; Black Loyalists formed two regiments of the Charleston garrison in 1783.

Estimates of the numbers who served the British during the war vary from 25,000 to 50,000, excluding those who escaped during wartime. Thomas Jefferson estimated that Virginia may have lost 30,000 slaves to escapes. In South Carolina, nearly 25,000 slaves (about 30 percent of the enslaved population) either fled, migrated, or died, which significantly disrupted the plantation economies both during and after the war.

Black Patriots were barred from the Continental Army until Washington convinced Congress in January 1778 that there was no other way to replace losses from disease and desertion. The 1st Rhode Island Regiment formed in February included former slaves whose owners were compensated; however, only 140 of its 225 soldiers were Black and recruitment stopped in June 1788. Ultimately, around 5,000 African Americans served in the Continental Army and Navy in a variety of roles, while another 4,000 were employed in Patriot militia units, aboard privateers, or as teamsters, servants, and spies. After the war, a small minority received land grants or Congressional pensions; many others were returned to their masters post-war despite earlier promises of freedom.

As a Patriot victory became increasingly likely, the treatment of Black Loyalists became a point of contention; after the surrender of Yorktown in 1781, Washington insisted all escapees be returned but Cornwallis refused. In 1782 and 1783, around 8,000 to 10,000 freed Blacks were evacuated by the British from Charleston, Savannah, and New York; some moved onto London, while 3,000 to 4,000 settled in Nova Scotia. White Loyalists transported 15,000 enslaved Blacks to Jamaica and the Bahamas. The free Black Loyalists who migrated to the British West Indies included regular soldiers from Dunmore's Ethiopian Regiment, and those from Charleston who helped garrison the Leeward Islands.

=== Native Americans ===
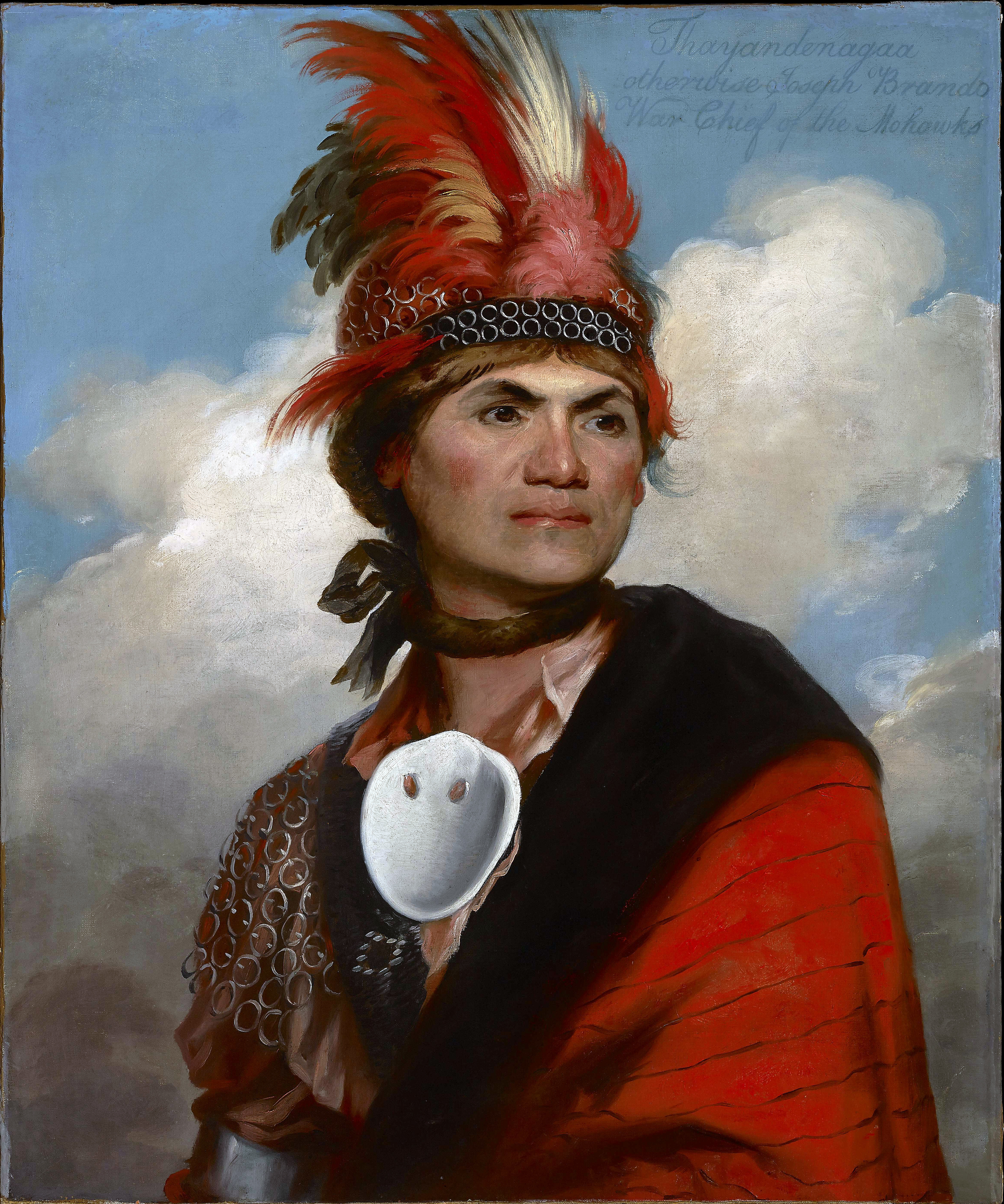
Colonel Joseph Brant of the British-led Mohawks in the war

Most Native Americans east of the Mississippi River were affected by the war, and many tribes were divided over how to respond. A few tribes were friendly with the colonists, but most tribes opposed the union of the Colonies as a potential threat to their territory. Approximately 13,000 Native Americans fought on the British side, with the largest group coming from tribal factions of the Haudenosaunee Confederacy (also known as the Iroquois) who deployed around 1,500 men.

Early in July 1776, Cherokee allies of Britain attacked the short-lived Washington District of North Carolina. Their defeat splintered both Cherokee settlements and people, and was directly responsible for the rise of the Chickamauga Cherokee, who perpetrated the Cherokee–American wars against American settlers for decades after hostilities with Britain ended.

Muscogee and other allies of Britain fought against Americans in Georgia and South Carolina. In 1778, a force of 800 Muscogee destroyed American settlements along the Broad River in Georgia. Muscogee warriors also joined Thomas Brown's raids into South Carolina and assisted Britain during the siege of Savannah. Many Native Americans were involved in the fight between Britain and Spain on the Gulf Coast and along the British side of the Mississippi River. Thousands of Muscogee, Chickasaw, and Choctaw fought in major battles such as the Battle of Fort Charlotte, the Battle of Mobile, and the siege of Pensacola.

The Haudenosaunee Confederacy was shattered as a result of the American Revolutionary War. The Seneca, Onondaga, and Cayuga tribes sided with the British; members of the Mohawks fought on both sides; and many Tuscarora and Oneida sided with the Americans. To retaliate against raids on American settlement by Loyalists and their Indian allies, the Continental Army dispatched the Sullivan Expedition throughout New York to debilitate the Iroquois tribes that had sided with the British. Mohawk leaders Akiatonharónkwen (also known as Joseph Louis Cook) and Thayendanegea (also known as Joseph Brant) sided with the Americans and the British respectively, which further exacerbated the split.

In the western theater, conflicts between settlers and Native Americans led to lingering distrust. In the 1783 Treaty of Paris, Great Britain ceded control of the disputed lands between the Great Lakes and the Ohio River, but Native American inhabitants were not a part of the peace negotiations. Tribes in the Northwest Territory joined as the Western Confederacy and allied with the British to resist American settlement, and their conflict continued after the end of the Revolutionary War as the Northwest Indian War.

== Peace negotiations ==
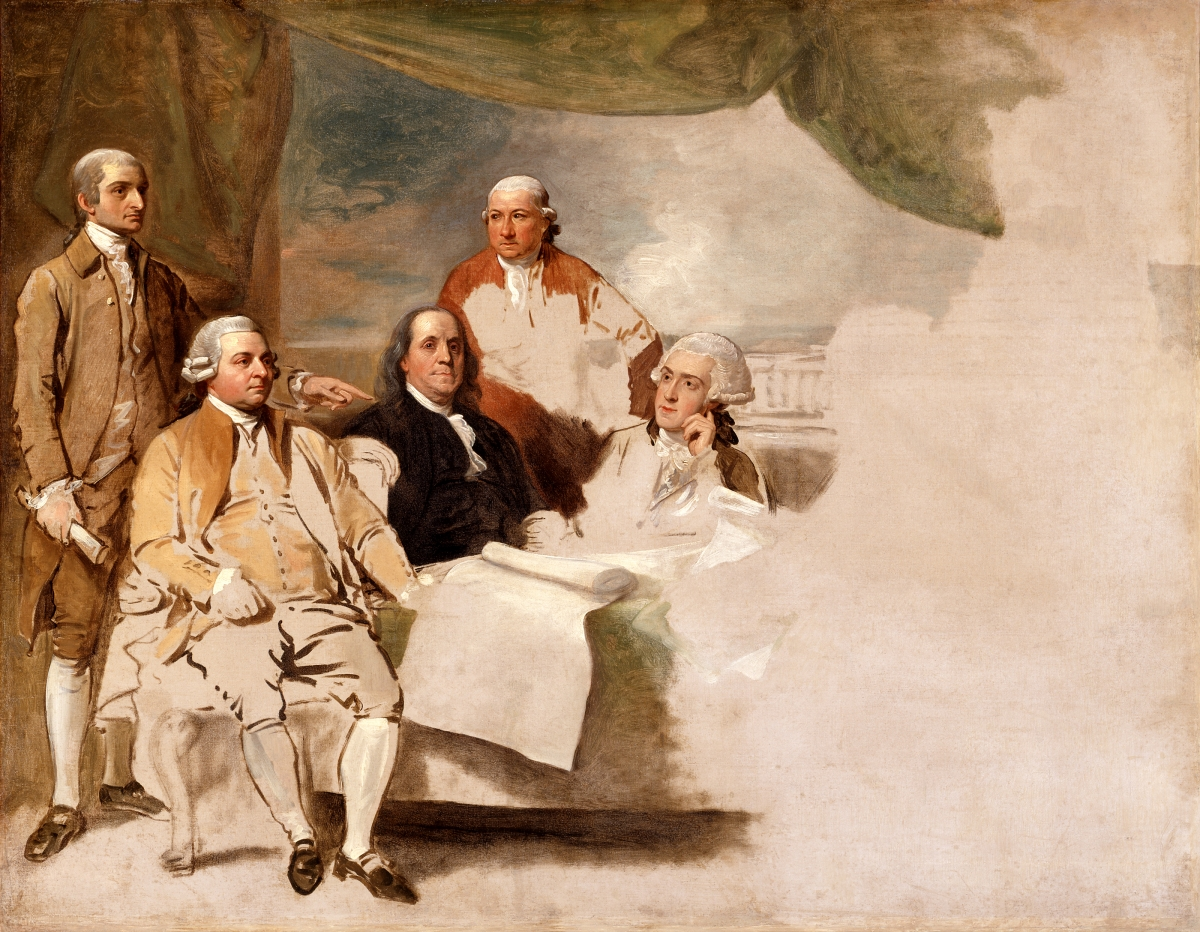
Treaty of Paris by Benjamin West, portrays the American Commissioners of (left–right): John Jay, John Adams, Benjamin Franklin, Henry Laurens, and William Temple Franklin. The portrait was never completed because the British commissioners refused to pose. Laurens, pictured, was actually in London at the time it was painted.

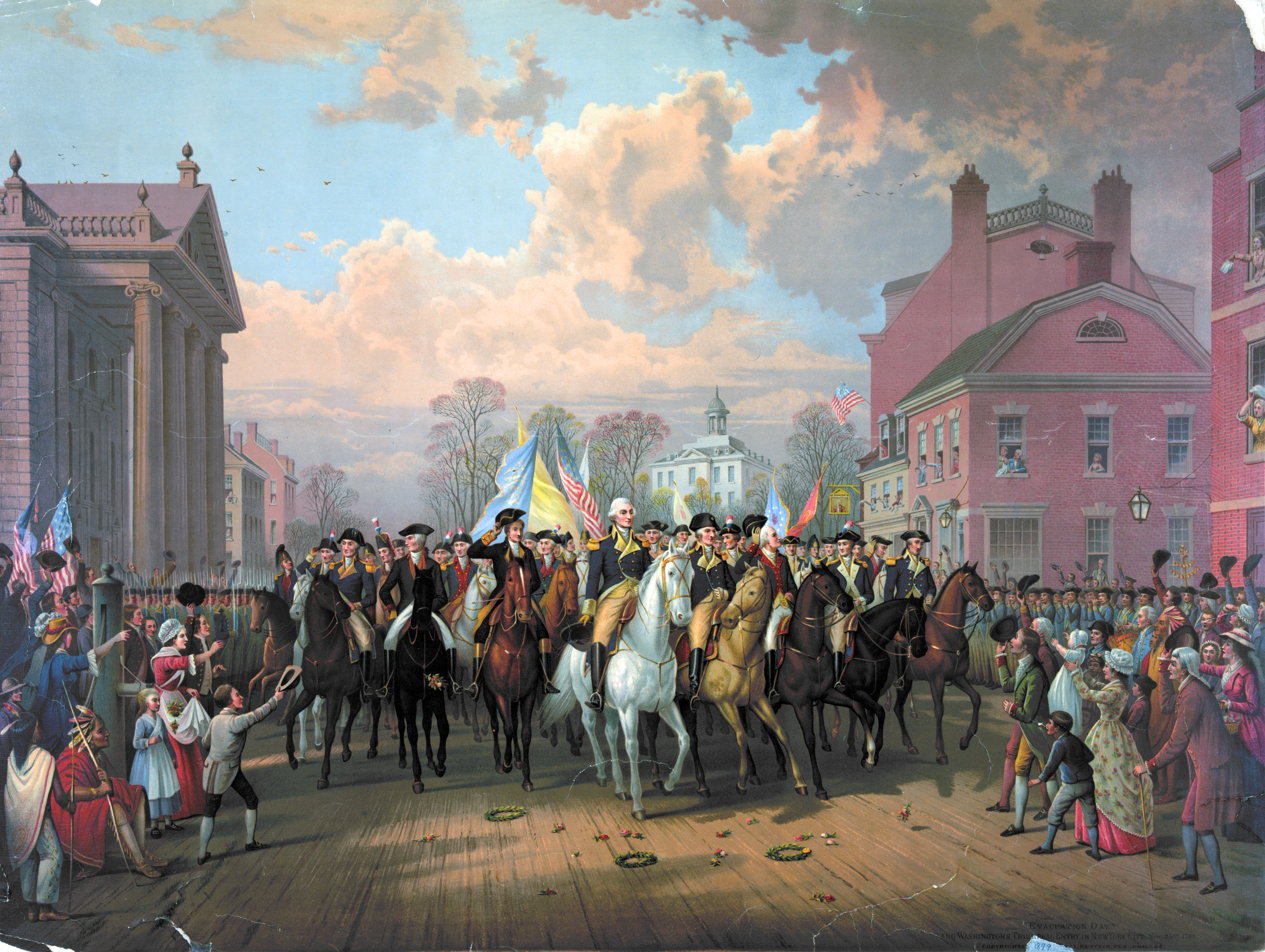
Washington enters New York City at British evacuation, November 1783. St. Paul's Chapel is on left. The parade route in 1783 went from Bull's Head Tavern on Bowery, then continued down Chatham, Pearl, Wall, and ended at Cape's Tavern on Broadway.

The terms presented by the Carlisle Peace Commission in 1778 included acceptance of the principle of self-government. Parliament would recognize Congress as the governing body, suspend any objectionable legislation, surrender its right to local colonial taxation, and discuss including American representatives in the House of Commons. In return, all property confiscated from Loyalists would be returned, British debts honored, and locally enforced martial law accepted. However, Congress demanded either immediate recognition of independence or the withdrawal of all British troops; they knew the commission were not authorized to accept these, bringing negotiations to a rapid end.

On February 27, 1782, a Whig motion to end the offensive war in America was carried by 19 votes. North resigned, obliging the king to invite Lord Rockingham to form a government; a consistent supporter of the Patriot cause, he made a commitment to US independence a condition of doing so. George III reluctantly accepted and the new government took office on March 27, 1782; however, Rockingham died unexpectedly on July 1, and was replaced by Lord Shelburne who acknowledged American independence.

When Lord Rockingham was elevated to Prime Minister, Congress consolidated its diplomatic consuls in Europe into a peace delegation at Paris. The dean of the delegation was Benjamin Franklin. He had become a celebrity in the French Court, but he was also influential in the courts of Prussia and Austria. Since the 1760s, Franklin had been an organizer of British American inter-colony cooperation, and then served as a colonial lobbyist to Parliament in London. John Adams had been consul to the Dutch Republic and was a prominent early New England Patriot. John Jay of New York had been consul to Spain and was a past president of the Continental Congress. As consul to the Dutch Republic, Henry Laurens had secured a preliminary agreement for a trade agreement. Although active in the preliminaries, he was not a signer of the conclusive treaty.

The Whig negotiators included long-time friend of Franklin David Hartley, and Richard Oswald, who had negotiated Laurens' release from the Tower of London. The Preliminary Peace signed on November 30 met four key Congressional demands: independence, territory up to the Mississippi, navigation rights into the Gulf of Mexico, and fishing rights in Newfoundland.

British strategy was to strengthen the US sufficiently to prevent France from regaining a foothold in North America, and they had little interest in these proposals. However, divisions between their opponents allowed them to negotiate separately with each to improve their overall position, starting with the American delegation in September 1782. The French and Spanish sought to improve their position by creating the US dependent on them for support against Britain, thus reversing the losses of 1763. Both parties tried to negotiate a settlement with Britain excluding the Americans; France proposed setting the western boundary of the US along the Appalachians, matching the British 1763 Proclamation Line. The Spanish suggested additional concessions in the vital Mississippi River Basin, but required the cession of Georgia in violation of the Franco-American alliance.

Facing difficulties with Spain over claims involving the Mississippi River, and from France who was still reluctant to agree to American independence until all her demands were met, John Jay told the British that he was willing to negotiate directly with them, cutting off France and Spain, and Prime Minister Lord Shelburne, in charge of the British negotiations, agreed. Key agreements for the United States in obtaining peace included recognition of US independence; all of the territory east of the Mississippi River, north of Florida and south of Canada; and fishing rights in the Grand Banks, off the coast of Newfoundland and in the Gulf of Saint Lawrence. The United States and Great Britain were each given perpetual access to the Mississippi River.

An Anglo-American Preliminary Peace was formally entered into in November 1782, and Congress endorsed the settlement on April 15, 1783. It announced the achievement of peace with independence, and the conclusive treaty was signed on September 2, 1783, in Paris, effective the following day when Britain signed its treaty with France. John Adams, who helped draft the treaty, claimed it represented "one of the most important political events that ever happened on the globe". Ratified respectively by Congress and Parliament, the final versions were exchanged in Paris the following spring. On November 25, the last British troops remaining in the US were evacuated from New York to Halifax.

== Aftermath ==
=== Territory ===
The expanse of territory that was now the US included millions of sparsely settled acres south of the Great Lakes between the Appalachian Mountains and the Mississippi River, much of which was part of Canada. The tentative colonial migration westward became a flood during the war.

Britain's extended post-war policy for the US continued to try to establish an Indian barrier state below the Great Lakes as late as 1814 during the War of 1812. The formally acquired western American lands continued to be populated by indigenous tribes that had mostly been British allies. In practice the British refused to abandon the forts on territory they formally transferred. Instead, they provisioned military allies for continuing frontier raids and sponsored the Northwest Indian War (1785–1795). British sponsorship of local warfare on the US continued until the Anglo-American Jay Treaty, authored by Hamilton, went into effect on February 29, 1796. (Note: For the thirteen years prior to the Anglo-American commercial Jay Treaty of 1796 under President George Washington, the British maintained five forts in New York state: two forts at northern Lake Champlain, and three beginning at Fort Niagara stretching east along Lake Ontario. In the Northwest Territory, they garrisoned Fort Detroit and Fort Michilimackinac.)

Of the European powers with American colonies adjacent to the newly created US, Spain was most threatened by American independence, and it was correspondingly the most hostile to it. (Note: There had been native-born Spanish (hidalgo) uprisings in several American colonies during the American Revolution, contesting mercantilist reforms of Carlos III that had removed privileges inherited from the Conquistadors among encomiendas, and they also challenged Jesuit dominance in the Catholic Church there. American ship captains were known to have smuggled banned copies of the Declaration of Independence into Spanish Caribbean ports, provoking Spanish colonial discontent.) Its territory adjacent to the US was relatively undefended, so Spanish policy developed a combination of initiatives. Spanish soft power diplomatically challenged the British territorial cession west to the Mississippi River and the previous northern boundaries of Spanish Florida. It imposed a high tariff on American goods, then blocked American settler access to the port of New Orleans. At the same time, the Spanish also sponsored war within the US by Indian proxies in its Southwest Territory ceded by France to Britain, then Britain to the Americans.

=== Casualties and losses ===
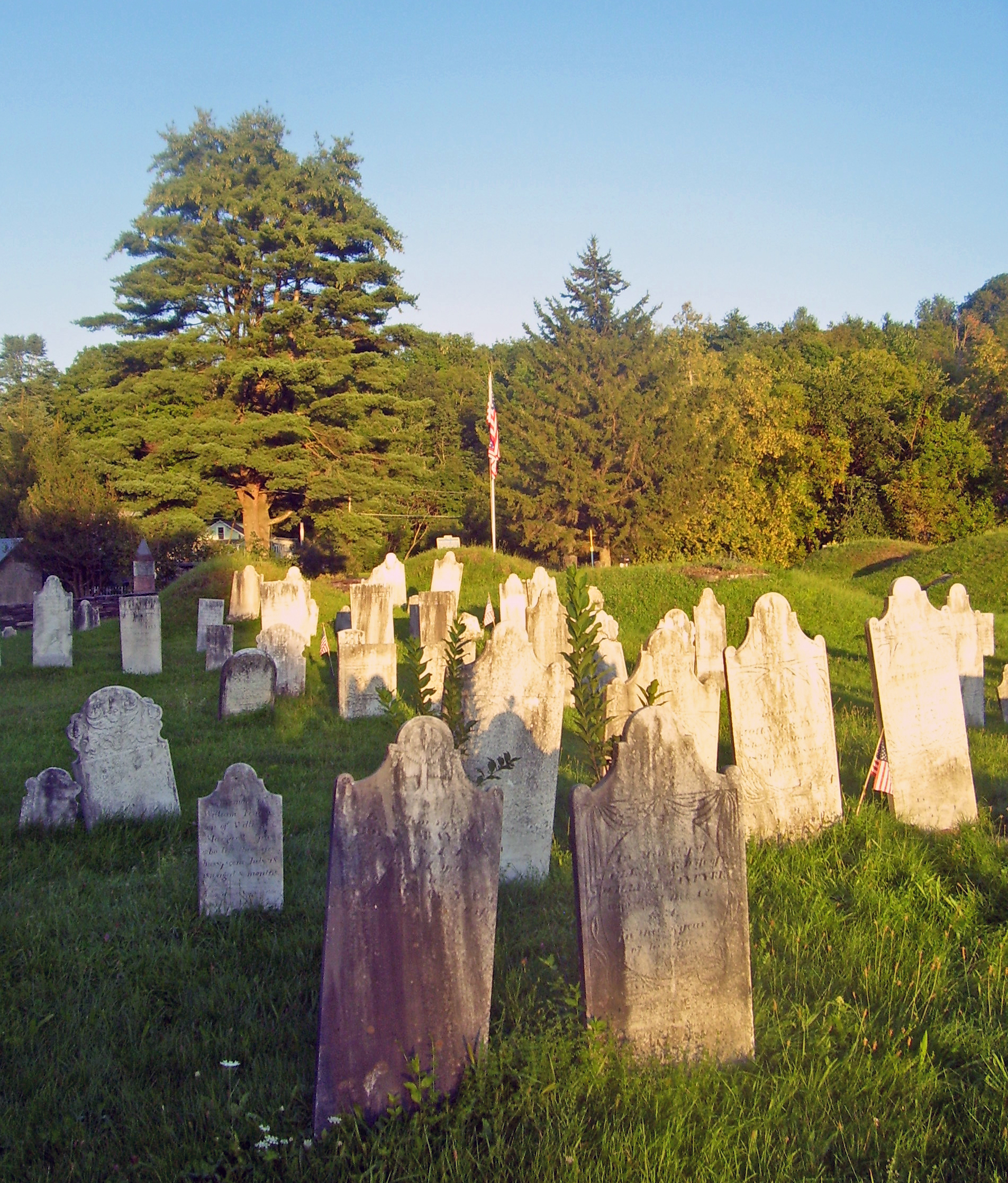
Mass graves from the Battles of Saratoga in the Revolutionary War Cemetery, Salem, New York

The total loss of life throughout the conflict is largely unknown. As was typical in wars of the era, diseases such as smallpox claimed more lives than the battle itself. Between 1775 and 1782, a smallpox epidemic throughout North America killed an estimated 130,000. (Note: In addition to as many as 30% deaths in port cities, and especially high rates among the closely confined prisoner-of-war ships, scholars have reported large numbers lost among the Mexican population, and large percentage losses among the Native American along trade routes, Atlantic to Pacific, Eskimo to Aztec.) Historian Joseph Ellis suggests that Washington having his troops inoculated against the disease was one of his most important decisions.

More than 25,000 Patriots died during active military service. Of these, approximately 6,800 were killed in battle, while at least 17,000 died from disease. A large portion of the latter died while prisoners of war of the British, mostly in the prison ships in New York Harbor. (Note: If the upper limit of 70,000 is accepted as the total net loss for the Patriots, it would make the conflict proportionally deadlier than the American Civil War. Uncertainty arises from the difficulties in accurately calculating the number of those who succumbed to disease, as it is estimated at least 10,000 died in 1776 alone.) The number of Patriots seriously wounded or disabled by the war has been estimated at 8,500 to 25,000. Peckham's study, considered the most definitive, specifically estimates 25,324 Patriot army, navy, and militia deaths, of which 6,824 were killed in combat and 18,500 died of disease or other causes (10,000 in camp, 8,500 as prisoners); wounded were estimated at 8,445. These casualties occurred over a total of 1,311 distinct military engagements on land, plus 215 at sea.

The French suffered 2,112 killed in combat in the United States. (Note: Elsewhere around the world, the French lost another approximately 5,000 total dead in conflicts 1778–1784.) The Spanish lost 124 killed and 247 wounded in West Florida. (Note: During the same time period in the Fourth Anglo-Dutch War, the Dutch suffered around 500 total killed, owing to the minor scale of their conflict with Britain.)

A British report of 1781 puts their deaths at 6,046 in continental North America (1775–1779) for the Army, thus excluding Germans, Loyalists, and sailors. Including both soldiers and sailors and counting theaters outside of North America, the total British military death toll (excluding officers) from 1775 to 1783 was 43,633. (Note: British returns in 1783 listed 43,633 rank and file deaths across the British Armed Forces. In the first three years of the Anglo-French War (1778), British list 9,372 soldiers killed in battle across the Americas; and 3,326 in the West Indies (1778–1780). In 1784, a British lieutenant compiled a detailed list of 205 British officers killed in action during British conflicts outside of North America, encompassing Europe, the Caribbean, and the East Indies. Extrapolations based upon this list puts British Army losses in the area of at least 4,000 killed or died of wounds outside of its North American engagements.) Approximately 7,774 Germans died in British service in addition to 4,888 deserters; among those labeled German deserters, however, it is estimated that 1,800 were killed in combat. (Note: Around 171,000 sailors served in the Royal Navy during British conflicts worldwide 1775–1784; approximately a quarter of whom had been pressed into service. Around 1,240 were killed in battle, while an estimated 18,500 died from disease (1776–1780). The greatest killer at sea was scurvy, a disease caused by vitamin C deficiency. It was not until 1795 that scurvy was eradicated from the Royal Navy after the Admiralty declared lemon juice and sugar were to be issued among the standard daily grog rations of sailors. Around 42,000 sailors deserted worldwide during the era. The impact on merchant shipping was substantial; 2,283 were taken by American privateers. Worldwide 1775–1784, an estimated 3,386 British merchant ships were seized by enemy forces during the war among Americans, French, Spanish, and Dutch.)

=== Legacy ===
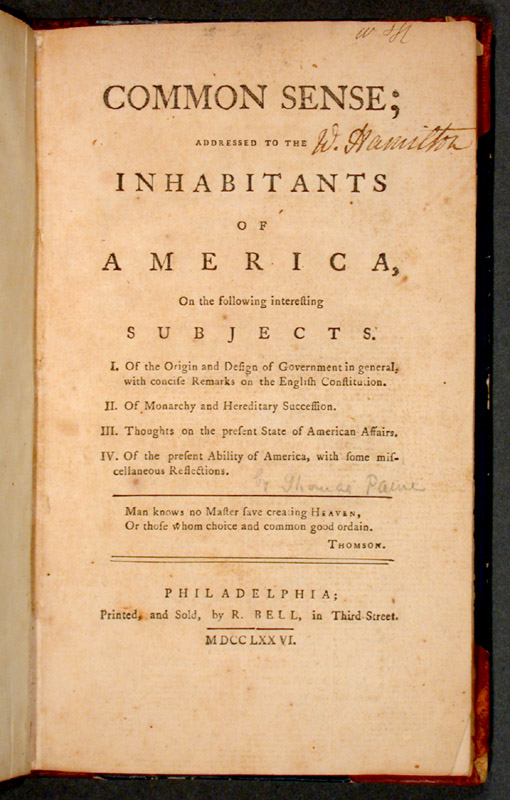
The US motto Novus ordo seclorum, meaning "A New Age Now Begins", is paraphrased from Thomas Paine's Common Sense, published January 10, 1776. "We have it in our power to begin the world over again", Paine wrote in it.

The American Revolution set an example to overthrow both monarchy and colonial governments. The United States has the world's oldest written constitution, which was used as a model in other countries, sometimes word-for-word. The Revolution inspired revolutions in France, Haiti, Latin America, and elsewhere.

Although the Revolution eliminated many forms of inequality, it did little to change the status of women and non whites, despite the role they played in winning independence. Most significantly, it failed to end slavery. While many were uneasy over the contradiction of demanding liberty for some, yet denying it to others, the dependence of southern states on slave labor made abolition too great a challenge at the time. Between 1774 and 1780, many of the states banned the importation of slaves, but the institution itself continued. In 1782, Virginia passed a law permitting manumission and over the next eight years more than 10,000 slaves were given their freedom. The number of abolitionist movements greatly increased, and by 1804 all the northern states had outlawed it. However, slavery continued to be a serious social and political issue and caused divisions that would ultimately end in the American Civil War.

=== Historiography ===
The body of historical writings on the American Revolution cite many motivations for the Patriot revolt. American Patriots stressed the denial of their constitutional rights as Englishmen, especially "no taxation without representation." Contemporaries credit the American Enlightenment with laying the intellectual, moral, and ethical foundations for the American Revolution among the Founding Fathers, who were influenced by the classical liberalism of John Locke and other Enlightenment writers and philosophers.

Two Treatises of Government has long been cited as a major influence on Revolutionary-era American thinking, but historians David Lundberg and Henry F. May contend that Locke's Essay Concerning Human Understanding was far more widely read. Historians since the 1960s have emphasized that the Patriot constitutional argument was made possible by the emergence of an American nationalism that united the Thirteen Colonies. In turn, that nationalism was rooted in a Republican value system that demanded consent of the governed and deeply opposed aristocratic control. In Britain, on the other hand, republicanism was largely a fringe ideology since it challenged the aristocratic control of the British monarchy and political system. Political power was not controlled by an aristocracy or nobility in the 13 colonies; instead, the colonial political system was based on the winners of free elections, which were open at the time to the majority of white men. In analysis of the Revolution, historians in recent decades have often cited three motivations behind it:

- The Atlantic history view places the American story in a broader context, including subsequent revolutions in France and Haiti. It tends to reintegrate the historiographies of the American Revolution and the British Empire.
- The "new social history" approach looks at community social structure to find cleavages that were magnified into colonial cleavages.
- The ideological approach that centers on republicanism in the United States. Republicanism dictated there would be no royalty, aristocracy or national church but allowed for continuation of the British common law, which American lawyers and jurists understood and approved and used in their everyday practice. Historians have examined how the rising American legal profession adopted British common law to incorporate republicanism by selective revision of legal customs and by introducing more choices for courts.

=== Revolutionary War commemoration stamps ===
After the first US postage stamp was issued in 1849, the US Postal Service frequently issued commemorative stamps celebrating people and events of the Revolutionary War. The first such stamp was the Liberty Bell issue of 1926.

Selected issues:

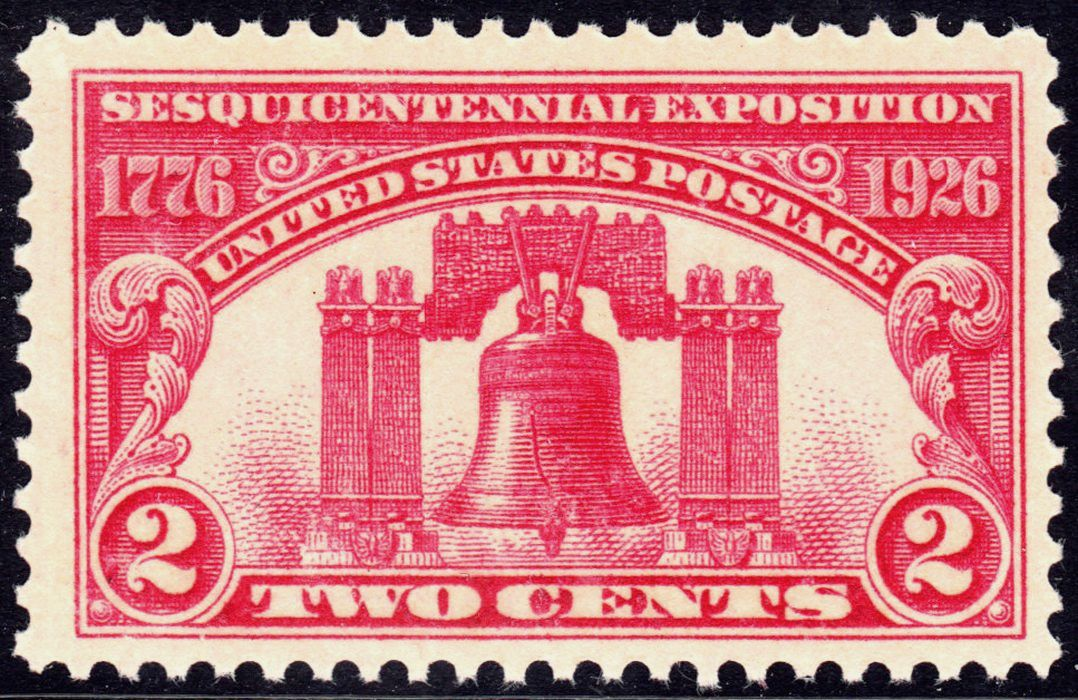
The Liberty Bell stamp, issued on the 150th anniversary of American independence in 1926

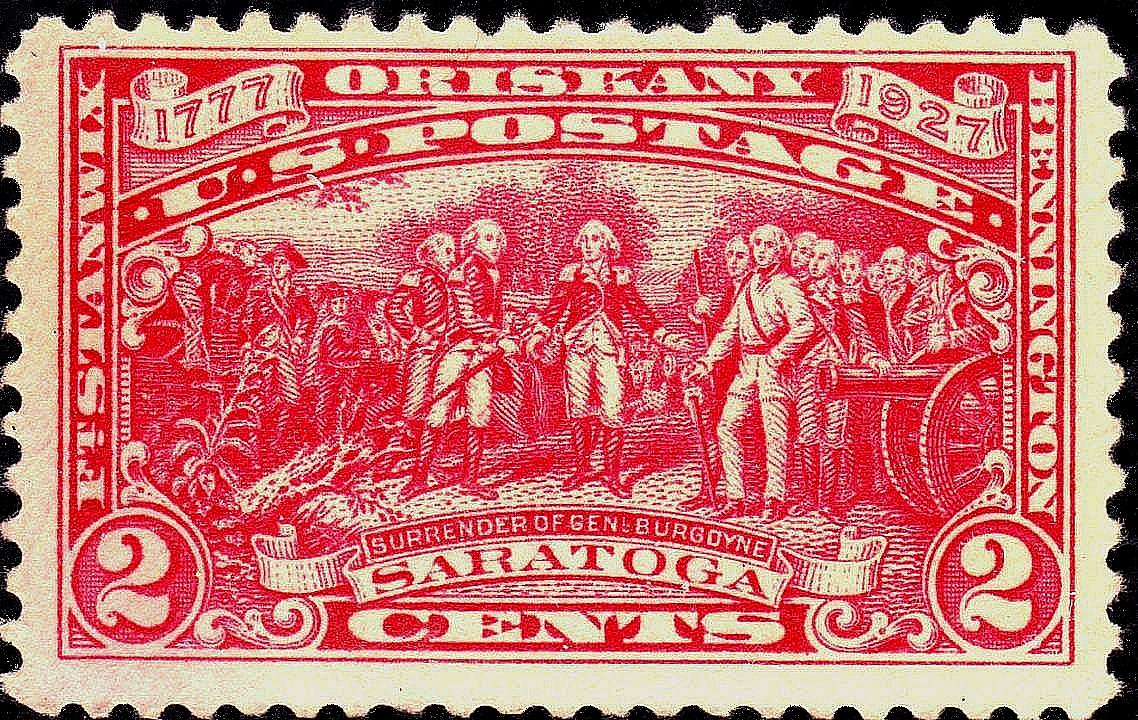
150th anniversary of the Battles of Saratoga stamp featuring Burgoyne's surrender, issued in 1927

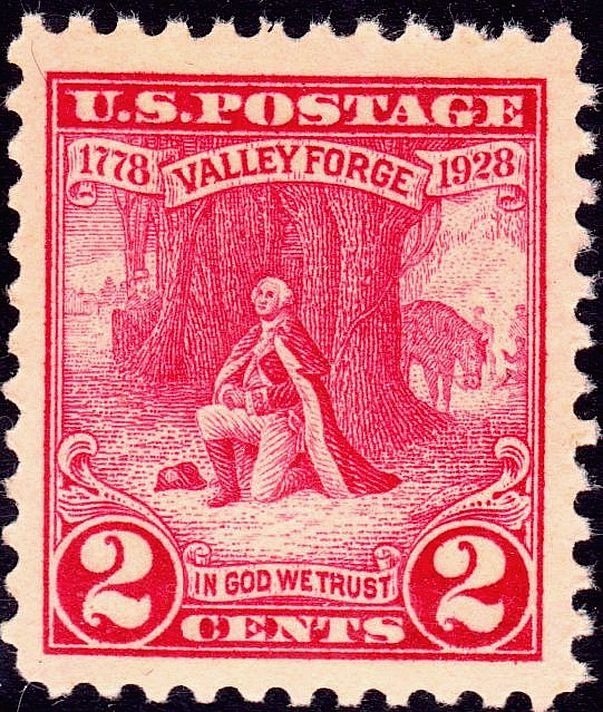
Washington at prayer at Valley Forge stamp, issued in 1928

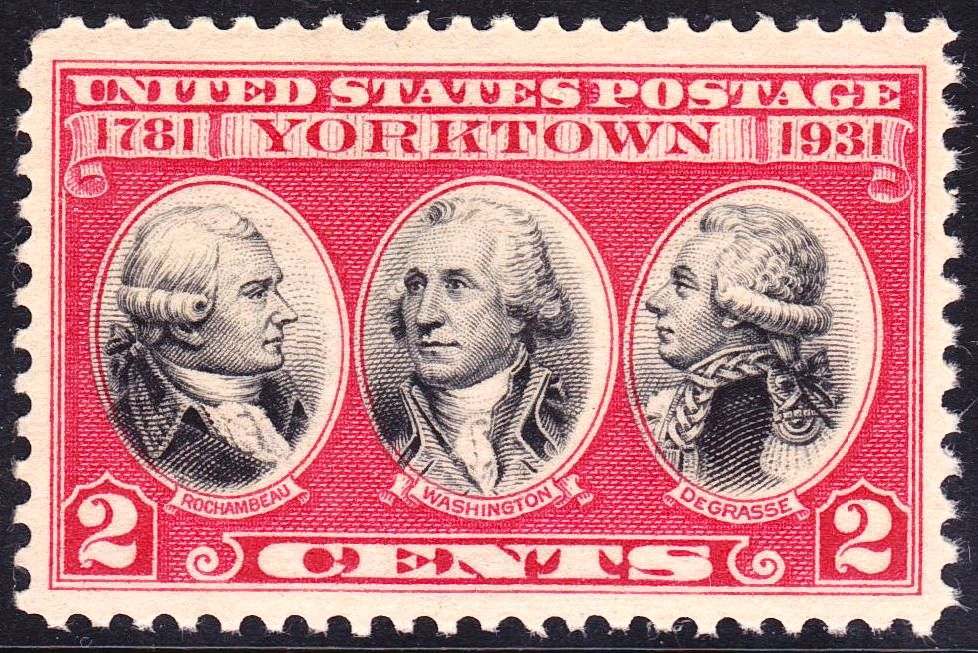
150th anniversary of the siege of Yorktown stamp featuring Rochambeau, Washington, and de Grasse, issued in 1931

== See also ==
- Outline of the American Revolutionary War
- Timeline of the American Revolution
- 1776 in the United States: events, births, deaths, and other years

=== Topics of the Revolution ===
- Committee of safety (American Revolution)
- Diplomacy in the American Revolutionary War
- Financial costs of the American Revolutionary War
- Flags of the American Revolution
- Naval operations in the American Revolutionary War

=== Social history of the Revolution ===
- Black Patriot
- Black Loyalists
- Christianity in the United States § American Revolution
- The Colored Patriots of the American Revolution
- History of Poles in the United States § American Revolution
- List of clergy in the American Revolution
- List of Loyalists (American Revolution)
- List of Patriots (American Revolution)
- Quakers in the American Revolution
- Scotch-Irish Americans § American Revolution

=== Others in the Revolution ===
- Nova Scotia in the American Revolution
- Watauga Association

=== Lists of Revolutionary military ===
- List of American Revolutionary War battles
- List of British Forces in the American Revolutionary War
- List of Continental Forces in the American Revolutionary War
- List of infantry weapons in the American Revolution
- List of United States militia units in the American Revolutionary War

=== Legacy and related ===
- American Revolution Statuary
- Bibliography of the American Revolutionary War
- Commemoration of the American Revolution
- Founders Online
- Independence Day (United States)
- The Last Men of the Revolution
- List of plays and films about the American Revolution
- List of wars of independence
- Museum of the American Revolution
- Tomb of the Unknown Soldier of the American Revolution
