= List of Patriots (American Revolution) =

Patriots were colonists of the Thirteen Colonies who rejected British rule during the American Revolution. Many Patriots served in multiple capacities.

== Statesmen and office holders ==
- John Adams
- Ethan Allen
- John Dickinson
- Benjamin Franklin
- Alexander Hamilton
- John Hancock
- John Jay
- Thomas Jefferson
- Benjamin Kent
- Richard Henry Lee
- James Madison
- William Paca
- Jonathan Shipley

== Businessmen and writers ==
- Samuel Adams
- Ethan Allen
- John Ames
- Alexander Hamilton
- Patrick Henry
- Elijah Parish Lovejoy
- Timothy Matlack
- Filippo Mazzei
- William Molineux
- James Otis Jr.
- Thomas Paine
- Molly Pitcher
- Samuel Prescott
- Paul Revere
- Roger Sherman
- Elkanah Watson

== Military officers ==
- Daniel Boone
- Peter Francisco
- John Gano
- Nathanael Greene
- Nathan Hale
- Elijah Isaacs
- John Paul Jones
- Henry Knox
- Marquis de Lafayette
- Charles Lee
- Benjamin Loxley
- Francis Marion
- Daniel Morgan
- Andrew Pickens
- John Parker
- Israel Putnam
- Daniel Shays
- Israel Shreve
- Arthur St. Clair
- Thomas Sumter
- James Mitchell Varnum
- Joseph Bradley Varnum
- Francis Vigo
- Friedrich Wilhelm von Steuben
- George Washington
- Anthony Wayne
- Comfort Hoyt Sr.

== African-American Patriots ==
- Crispus Attucks
- William Flora
- Prince Hall
- James Armistead Lafayette
- Saul Matthews
- Salem Poor
- Peter Salem
- Jack Sisson
- Prince Whipple
