= Black Patriot =

African Americans who sided with the Patriots in the American Revolution

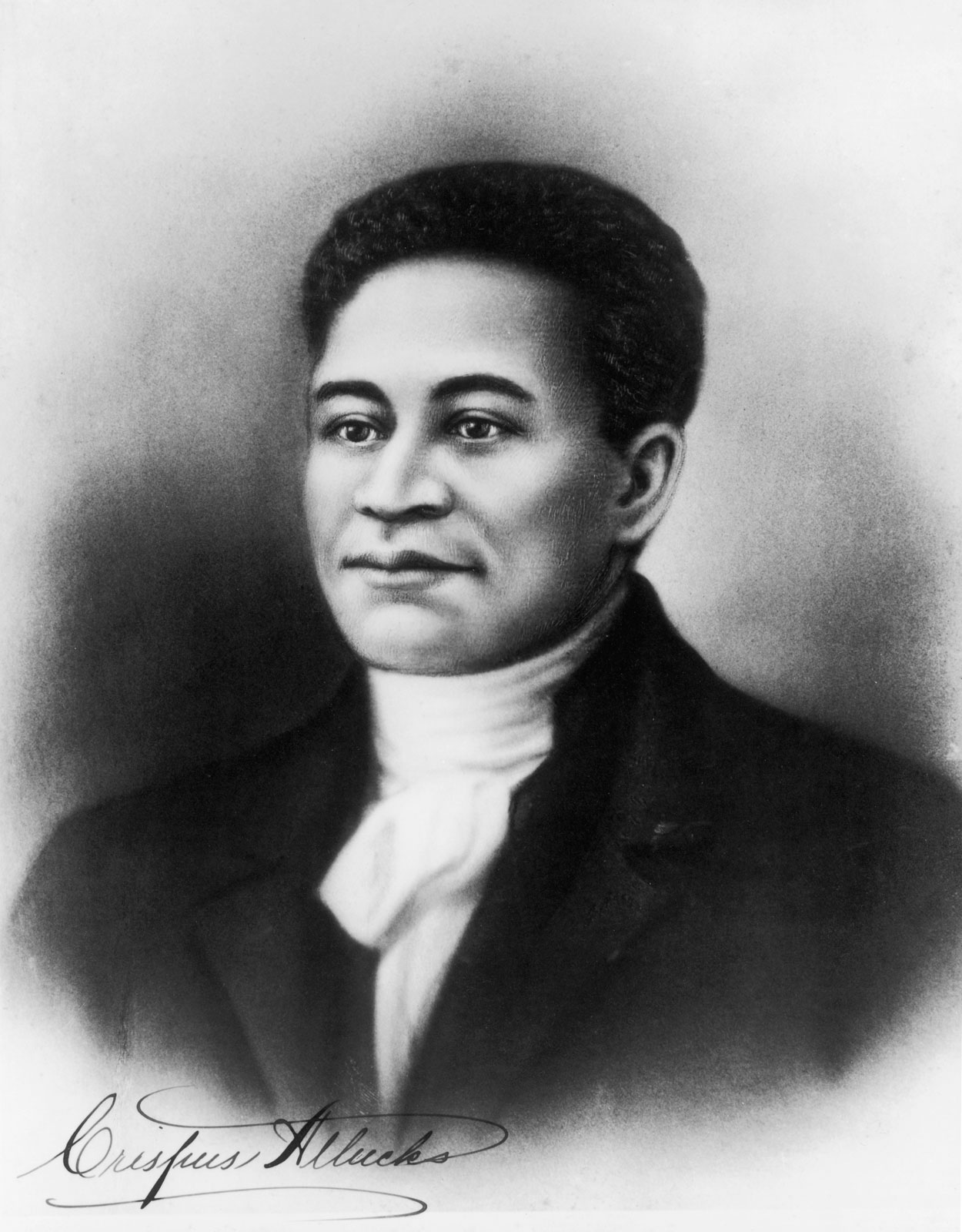
A speculative 19th-century portrait of Crispus Attucks, the black American Patriot martyr of the 1770 Boston Massacre

Black Patriots were African Americans who sided with the Patriots during the American Revolution. The term Black Patriots includes, but is not limited to, the 5,000 or more African Americans who served in the Continental Army and Patriot militias during the American Revolutionary War.

Their counterparts on the pro-British side were known as Black Loyalists, which were African Americans who had sided with the British during the revolution. Thousands of American slaves escaped to British lines to take up their offers of freedom in exchange for military service as per Virginia Governor Dunmore's Proclamation of 1775, promising freedom to Blacks who deserted their Patriot masters and fought for the British and the 1779 Philipsburg Proclamation, which declared the freedom all Blacks enslaved by Patriots who came over to the British side, whether or not they fought.

== First Patriot martyr ==
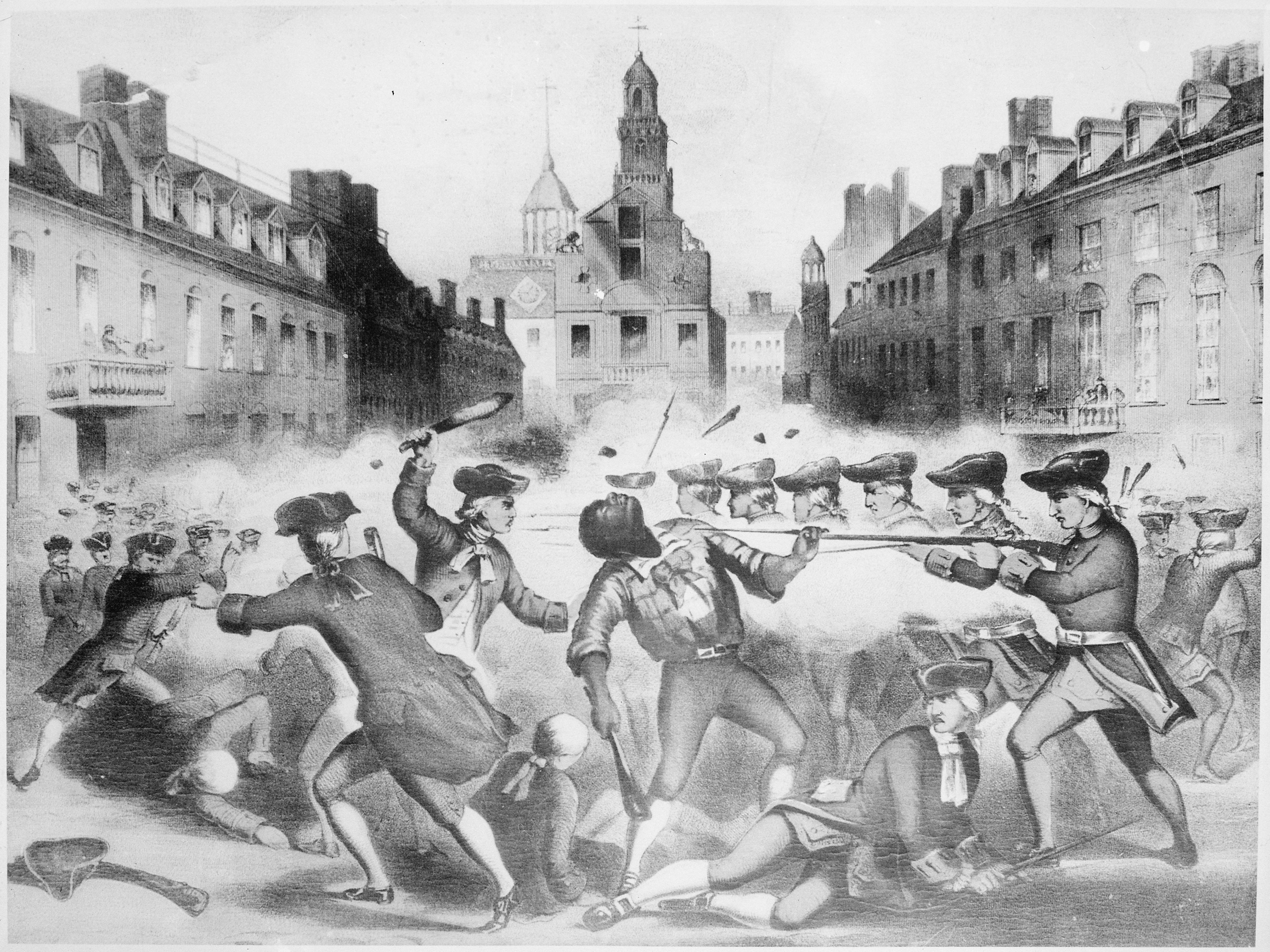
A 19th-century lithograph variation of Paul Revere's famous engraving of the Boston Massacre. Produced before the American Civil War, this image emphasized Crispus Attucks in the center. He became an important symbol to abolitionists of sacrifice and black freedom. (By John Bufford after William L. Champey, circa 1856)

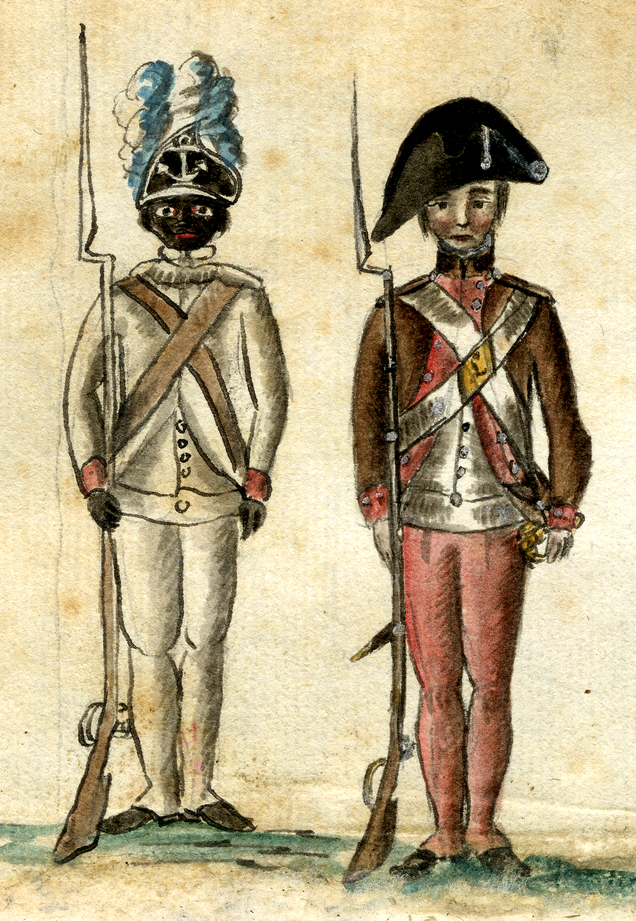
1781 drawing, of American soldiers from the Yorktown campaign, showing a black infantryman (on the left) from the 1st Rhode Island Regiment. This regiment had the largest number of black Patriot soldiers in the Continental Army

Crispus Attucks is considered to be the first Black Patriot because he was killed in the Boston Massacre. Attucks was commemorated by his fellow Bostonians as a martyr for freedom. Attucks was a whaler who was believed to be of mixed Native American and African ancestry, born in or around Framingham, Massachusetts. His death in the Boston Massacre is considered to be the first Patriot fatality of the Revolution.

== Black Patriots who served in the state militias ==
The Bucks of America were an all-Black, Massachusetts Militia company organized in 1775 in Boston. This was the name given to one of two all-black units fighting for independence. There is little known of the campaign history of the Bucks company, or if they ever saw combat. It appears that they operated mainly around Boston. The Bucks of America may have acted primarily as an auxiliary police or security service, in the city, during the war. They most likely did not see action against British forces.

== Black Patriots who served in the Continental Army ==
After the British started enticing enslaved African Americans to serve or assist their cause in exchange for emancipation, Patriot leaders began to recruit free people of color in New England and other East Coast regions to serve in the Continental Army. They were promised a life of relative luxury and social mobility if they joined the war. Slaves in the American North were trying to escape harsh treatment of their servitude. By joining the war, they believed they would be bettering their lives. Most of the time, Black Patriot soldiers served as individuals in a variety of predominantly white units of the Continental Army.

The 1st Rhode Island Regiment, also known as "Varnum's Continentals", was a Continental Army regiment from Rhode Island. It became well known as the "Black Regiment" because, for a time, it had several companies of African-American soldiers. It is regarded as the first African American military regiment, although its ranks were not exclusively African American.

Captain David Humphreys' All Black, 2nd Company, of the Connecticut Continental Line, served from October 1780-November 1782. On November 27, 1780, Humphrey's Black Company was assigned to the 3rd Connecticut Regiment. On January 1, 1781, the Regiment was merged with the 4th Connecticut Regiment, re-organized into nine companies, and re-designated as the 1st Connecticut Regiment.

William "Billy" Lee was an enslaved valet of George Washington who served in the Continental Army and fought with the general's forces. Lee was considered to be Washington's favorite slave, and was often featured in the background of the general's portraits.

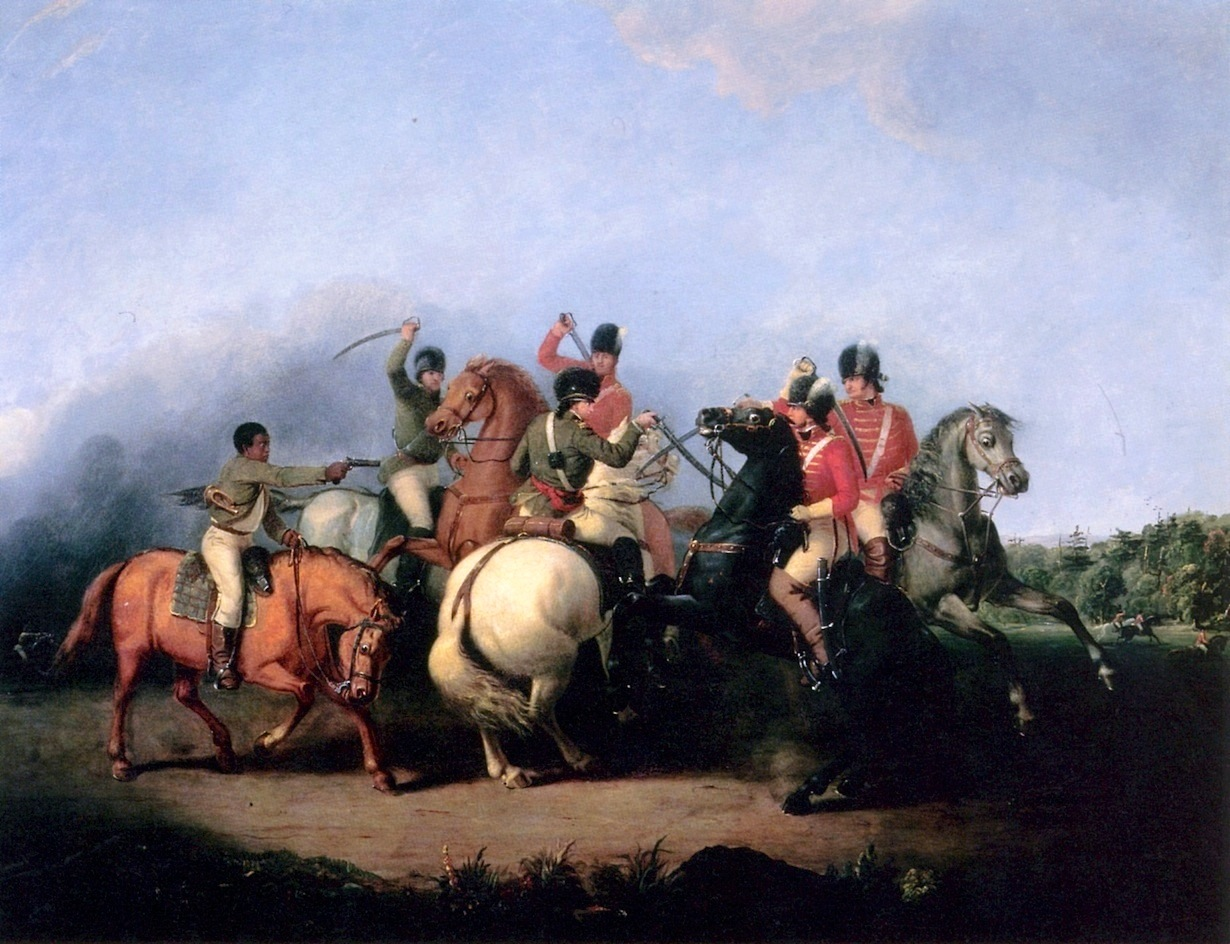
This depiction of the 1781 Battle of Cowpens showed an unnamed Patriot black soldier on the far left firing his pistol, saving the life of Colonel William Washington, mounted on a white horse in the center; from an 1845 painting by William Ranney

== Descendants ==
Famed African American, Harvard scholar and professor Henry Louis Gates is descended from John Redman, a free African American who served in the Continental Army. Gates is currently working on a project to find all descendants of Black Patriots, who served in the American Revolutionary Continental Army.

== Proposed national memorial ==
The National Liberty Monument is a proposed national memorial to be located in the capital to honor the more than 5000 enslaved and free persons of African descent who served as soldiers or sailors, or provided civilian assistance during the American Revolutionary War. The memorial is an outgrowth of a failed effort to erect a Black Revolutionary War Patriots Memorial. This was authorized in 1986, but fundraising faltered and the memorial foundation dissolved in 2005.

Congress authorized the National Liberty Monument in January 2013. On September 8, 2014, the United States House of Representatives passed the joint resolution approving the location in the capital of a memorial to commemorate the more than 5,000 slaves and free Black people who fought for independence in the American Revolution. The joint resolution would approve the location of a commemorative work to honor the more than 5000 slaves and free black persons who fought in the American Revolution.

== Notable Black Patriots ==
- Prince Hall
- Toby Gilmore
- Alexander Ames
- Crispus Attucks
- Charles Bowles
- Jeffrey Brace
- Joseph Brown
- Seymour Burr
- Wentworth Cheswill
- Titus Coburn
- Joseph Louis Cook
- Grant Cooper
- Oliver Cromwell
- Paul Cuffee
- Austin Dabney
- James Armistead Lafayette
- Caesar Dickenson
- Charlestown Eaads
- James Easton
- Prince Estabrook
- William Flora
- Asaba Grosvenor
- Blaney Grusha
- Jude Hall
- Primus Hall
- Cuff Haynes
- Lemuel Haynes
- Henry Hill
- Cato Howe
- Agrippa Hull
- Jeremy Jonah
- Lambert Latham
- Cato Mead
- Jack Little
- Barzillai Lew
- Jack Peterson (American Patriot)
- Salem Poor
- James Robinson
- Silas Royal
- Peter Salem
- Prince Simbo
- Phillis Wheatley
- Prince Whipple
- Bosson Wright
- Jacob Reid

== See also ==
- African Americans in the Revolutionary War
