= Raynham, Massachusetts =

Town in Massachusetts, United States

- Town
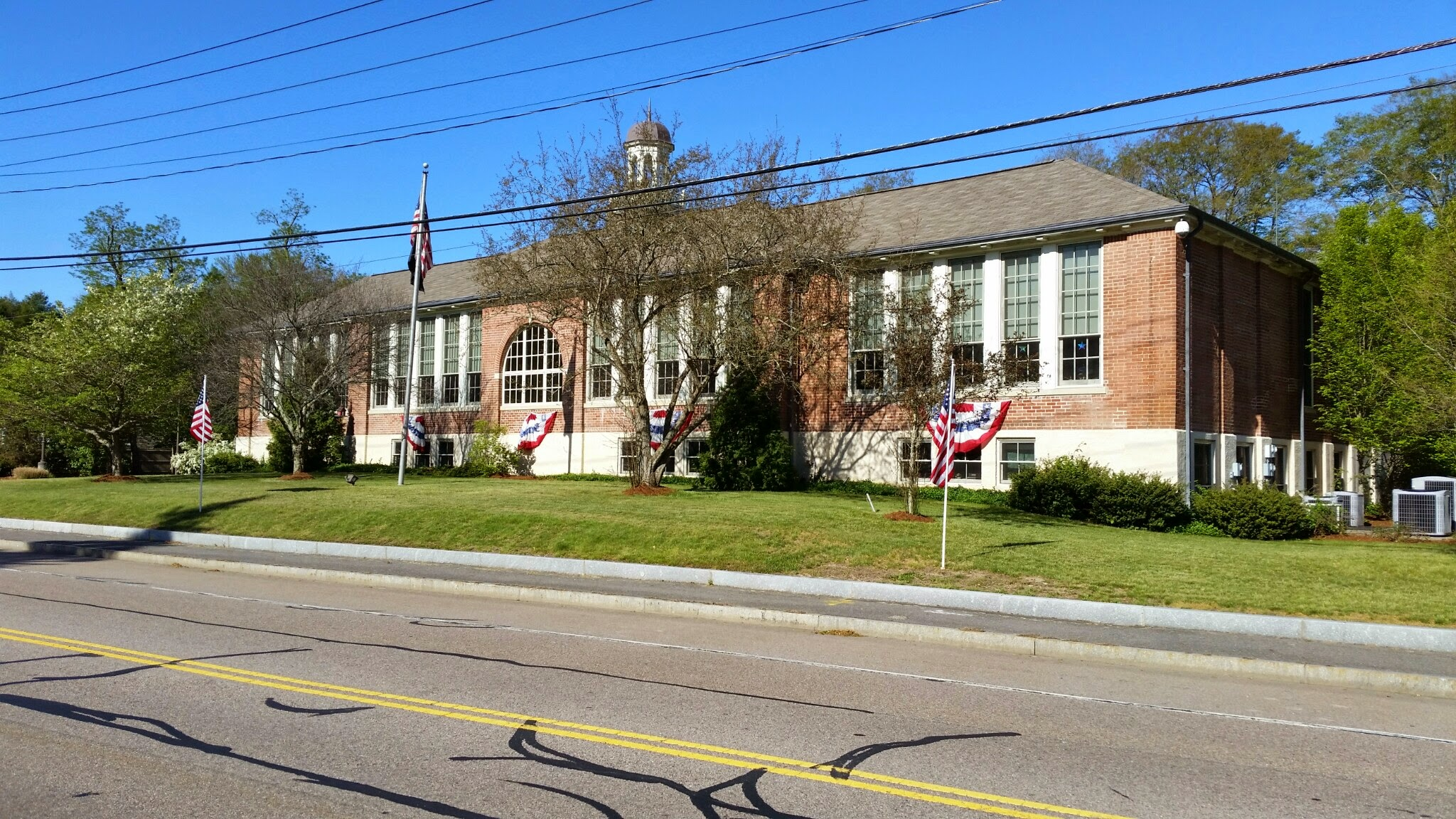
- Raynham Town Hall

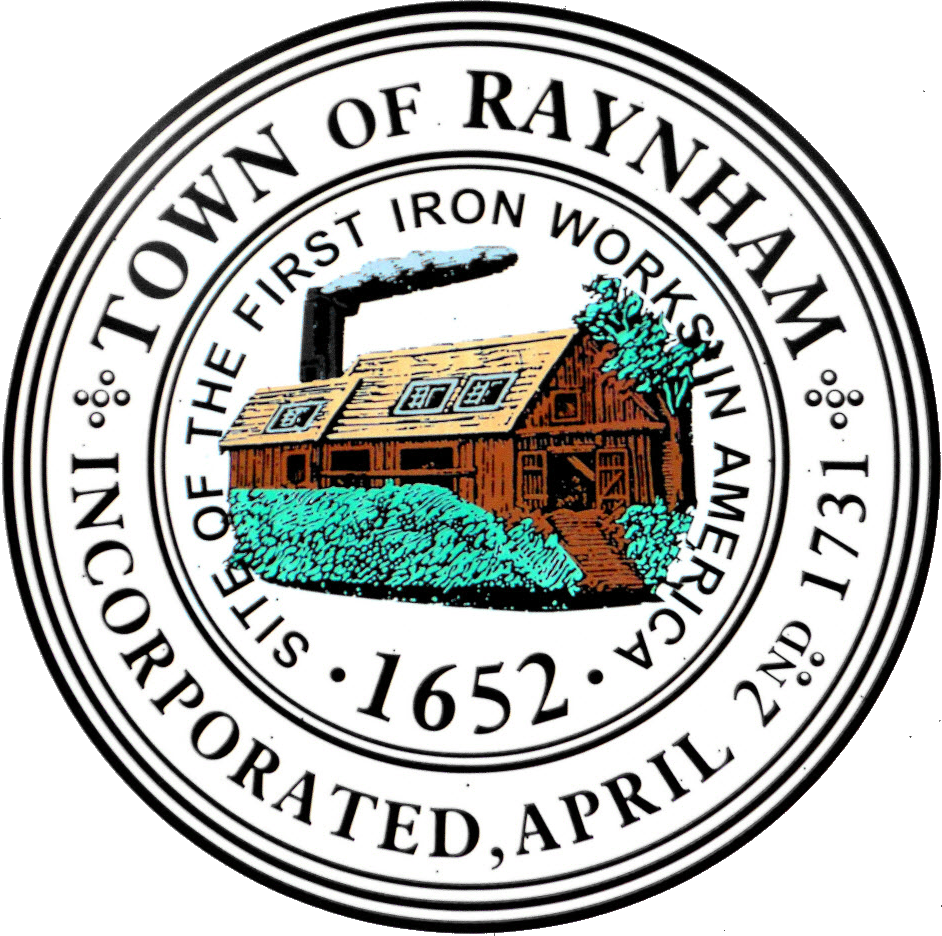
- Seal

- Location in Bristol County in Massachusetts
- Coordinates: 41°56′55″N 71°04′25″W
- Country: United States
- State: Massachusetts
- County: Bristol
- Settled: 1652
- Incorporated: 1731

Government
  - Type: Open town meeting

Area
  - Total: 20.8 sq mi (54.0 km^{2})
  - Land: 20.5 sq mi (53.1 km^{2})
  - Water: 0.35 sq mi (0.9 km^{2})
- Elevation: 82 ft (25 m)

Population (2020)
  - Total: 15,142
  - Density: 739/sq mi (285/km^{2})
- Time zone: UTC−5 (Eastern)
  - Summer (DST): UTC−4 (Eastern)
- ZIP Code: 02767
- Area code: 508/774
- FIPS code: 25-56060
- GNIS feature ID: 0618285
- Website: www.town.raynham.ma.us

Raynham (/reɪnhæm/) is a town in Bristol County, Massachusetts, United States, located approximately 32 miles (51 km) south of Boston and 22 miles (35 km) northeast of Providence, Rhode Island. The population was 15,082 at the 2020 census. It has one village, Raynham Center.

== History ==
The area that is now Raynham was settled in 1639 as a part of Taunton, and was founded by Elizabeth Pole, the first woman to found a town in America.

It was to that area three years earlier that Roger Williams, proponent of separation of church and state, of paying Indians for land acquired and abolishing slavery, had escaped, traveling 55 miles during a January blizzard. He was fleeing a conviction for sedition and heresy of the General Court of Salem, and it was here that the local Wampanoag people offered him shelter at their winter camp. Their Sachem Massasoit hosted Williams for the three months until spring.

In 1652, bog iron was found along the Two Mile (Forge) River. Soon after, the Taunton Iron Works was established by residents James and Henry Leonard. It was the first successful iron works established in what was then Plymouth Colony, and operated from 1656 to 1876. It was not the "First Iron Works in America", as proclaimed on the Town's official seal, having been predated by the Saugus and Braintree iron works. The success of the Taunton Iron Works, however, led to the establishment of other iron works throughout the colonies.

Raynham played a key part in King Philip's War. The Leonards had forged a friendship before the war began with King Philip, who lived in the area. It is said that Philip agreed to spare the town from the mass destruction if the Leonards repaired his troops' weapons in their iron forge.

The eastern end of Taunton was separated from that town and incorporated as Raynham on April 2, 1731, named after the English village of Raynham in the county of Norfolk, England. Many ships' hulls were built along the Taunton River in Raynham, which were sailed down the river towards Fall River and Narragansett Bay for final fittings. The town also had other small manufacturing industries, but for the most part it was known for its rural and agrarian base.

== Transportation ==
The intersection of Interstate 495 and Massachusetts Route 24, a four-lane divided highway, is located at the town's border with Bridgewater. Additionally, U.S. Route 44, Massachusetts Route 104 and Route 138 pass through the town. Route 24 has one exit which gives access to the town, Exit 20 (Route 44), and there is also a Raynham exit on Interstate 495: Exit 22 (Route 138).

Raynham is served Greater Attleboro Taunton Regional Transit Authority (GATRA) bus service. The nearest MBTA Commuter Rail stations are Bridgewater and East Taunton on the Fall River/New Bedford Line. The proposed second phase of the South Coast Rail project would include Raynham Place station.

The nearest local airport is in Taunton; commercial air service exists at Logan International Airport in Boston and at T. F. Green Airport in Providence, Rhode Island.

== Demographics ==
Historical population
Year	Pop.	±%
1790	1,094	—
1850	1,541	+40.9%
1860	1,746	+13.3%
1870	1,713	−1.9%
1880	1,681	−1.9%
1890	1,340	−20.3%
1900	1,540	+14.9%
1910	1,725	+12.0%
1920	1,695	−1.7%
1930	2,136	+26.0%
1940	2,141	+0.2%
1950	2,426	+13.3%
1960	4,150	+71.1%
1970	6,705	+61.6%
1980	9,085	+35.5%
1990	9,867	+8.6%
2000	11,739	+19.0%
2010	13,383	+14.0%
2020	15,142	+13.1%
2025*	16,579	+9.5%
* = population estimate. Source: United States census records and Population Estimates Program data.

As of the census of 2000, there were 11,739 people, 4,143 households, and 3,231 families residing in the town. The population density was 572.7 inhabitants per square mile (221.1/km^{2}). There were 4,209 housing units at an average density of 205.3 per square mile (79.3/km^{2}). The racial makeup of the town was 96.54% White, 1.04% African American, 0.06% Native American, 0.69% Asian, 0.03% Pacific Islander, 0.71% from other races, and 0.94% from two or more races. Hispanic or Latino of any race were 0.83% of the population.

There were 4,143 households, out of which 36.7% had children under the age of 18 living with them, 63.8% were married couples living together, 10.6% had a female householder with no husband present, and 22.0% were non-families. Of all households 17.9% were made up of individuals, and 8.5% had someone living alone who was 65 years of age or older. The average household size was 2.80 and the average family size was 3.18.

In the town, the population was spread out, with 25.7% under the age of 18, 6.8% from 18 to 24, 29.9% from 25 to 44, 24.7% from 45 to 64, and 13.0% who were 65 years of age or older. The median age was 38 years. For every 100 females, there were 91.8 males. For every 100 females age 18 and over, there were 88.5 males.

The median income for a household in the town was $60,449, and the median income for a family was $68,354. Males had a median income of $46,954 versus $31,760 for females. The per capita income for the town was $24,476. About 3.2% of families and 4.1% of the population were below the poverty line, including 3.7% of those under age 18 and 9.0% of those age 65 or over.

== Government ==
The town is part of the Massachusetts House of Representatives' 8th Plymouth district, which includes Bridgewater and part of Easton. It is also part of the Massachusetts Senate's 1st Plymouth and Bristol district, which includes Berkley, Bridgewater, Carver, Dighton, Marion, Middleborough, Taunton and Wareham. Raynham is patrolled by Massachusetts State Police#Troop D (Southeast District), 4th Barracks (located in Middleborough). On the national level, the town is part of Massachusetts's 4th congressional district, which is represented by Jake Auchincloss. The state's senior (Class I) Senator is Elizabeth Warren, and the state's junior (Class II) Senator is Ed Markey.

Raynham is governed by an open town meeting and elects a Select Board, which directs a full-time town administrator. Patricia Riley, Joseph Pacheco, and Matthew Andrade are the town elected select board members. The Town Administrator is Gregory Barnes. The three members of the board of selectmen are elected at large on a staggered schedule. Basic services are centered around the town hall located at Raynham Center, including the police station and fire department. There are two post offices, located near Raynham Center and along Route 138 near North Raynham. The town also operates the Borden Colony Recreation Area, and there is a small State Forest in the town. The presidential results were mostly democratic until 2008, when the town narrowly voted for Republican John McCain over Democrat Barack Obama. It was also Republican in 2012 and 2016 and it was Democratic in 2020. In the 2024 United States presidential election, Republican Donald Trump received 4,694 votes, while Democrat Kamala Harris received 4,059 votes.

Raynham presidential election results
Year	Democratic	Republican	Third parties	Total Votes	Margin
2024	45.50% 4,059	52.60% 4,694	1.90% 169	8,753	7.10%
2020	49.62% 4,372	48.16% 4,243	2.22% 196	8,811	1.46%
2016	43.93% 3,327	50.25% 3,806	5.82% 441	7,574	6.32%
2012	46.21% 3,222	52.46% 3,658	1.33% 93	6,973	6.25%
2008	47.49% 3,336	50.17% 3,524	2.33% 164	7,024	2.68%
2004	50.75% 3,223	48.59% 3,086	0.66% 42	6,351	2.16%
2000	54.53% 3,128	40.17% 2,304	5.30% 304	5,736	14.37%
1996	54.91% 2,751	32.40% 1,623	12.69% 636	5,010	22.51%
1992	35.56% 1,839	34.25% 1,771	30.19% 1,561	5,171	1.32%
1988	39.67% 1,820	59.00% 2,707	1.33% 61	4,588	19.33%
1984	33.61% 1,418	65.99% 2,784	0.40% 17	4,219	32.38%
1980	31.59% 1,319	52.49% 2,192	15.92% 665	4,176	20.91%
1976	48.00% 1,778	48.95% 1,813	3.05% 113	3,704	0.94%
1972	43.02% 1,242	56.46% 1,630	0.52% 15	2,887	13.44%
1968	47.68% 1,315	46.59% 1,285	5.73% 158	2,758	1.09%
1964	65.63% 1,575	34.08% 818	0.29% 7	2,400	31.54%
1960	43.75% 900	56.15% 1,155	0.10% 2	2,057	12.40%
1956	24.61% 405	73.39% 1,208	2.00% 33	1,646	48.78%
1952	30.67% 423	69.18% 954	0.15% 2	1,379	38.51%
1948	39.64% 444	59.02% 661	1.34% 15	1,120	19.38%
1944	34.45% 318	65.01% 600	0.54% 5	923	30.55%
1940	33.50% 338	66.40% 670	0.10% 1	1,009	32.90%

== Education ==
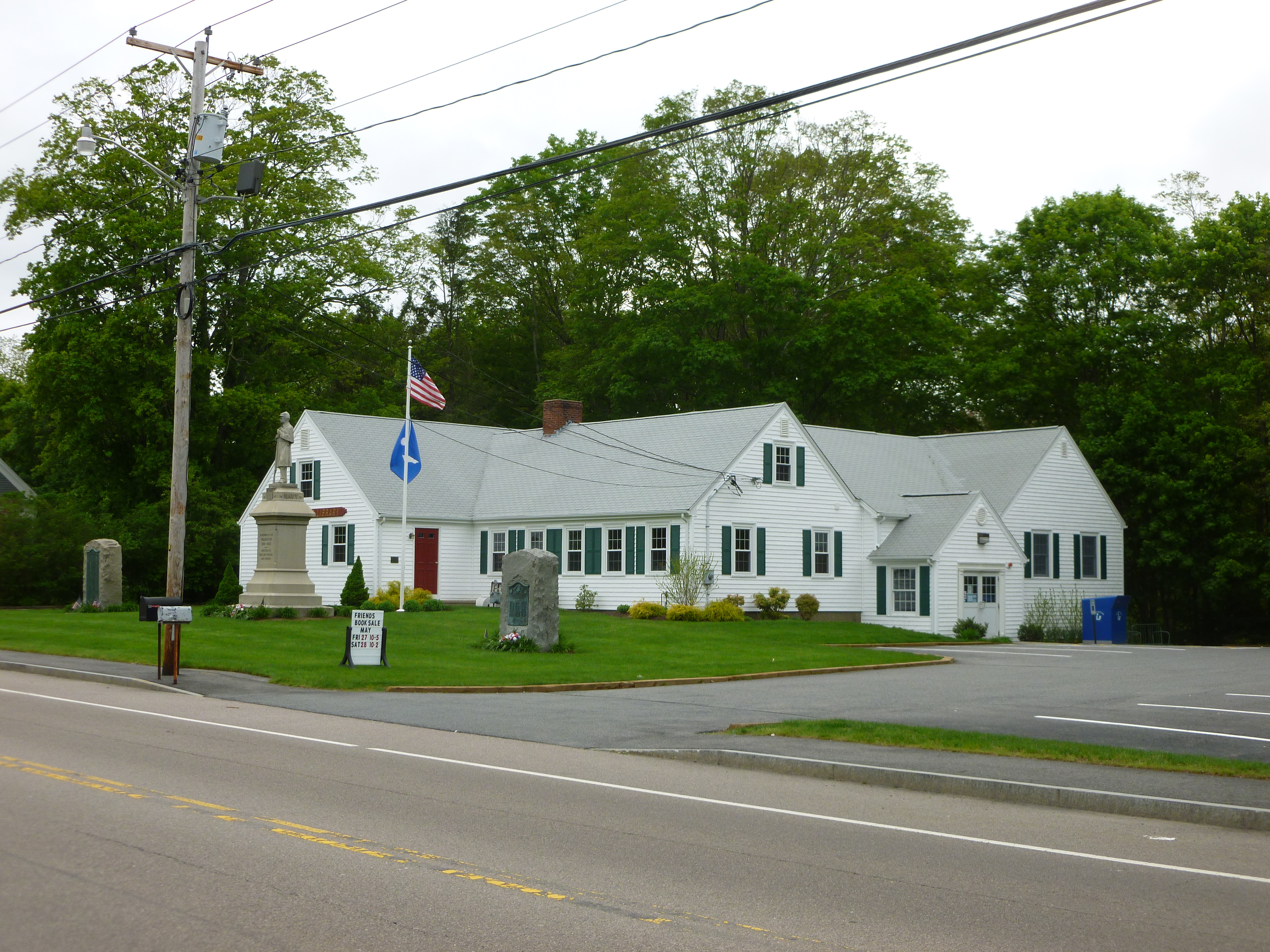
Raynham Public Library, with World War II, Civil War and World War I memorials on lawn

Raynham belongs to the Bridgewater-Raynham Regional School District. There are three schools in Raynham: L.B. Merrill Elementary School, housing Pre-Kindergarten through first grade, LaLiberte Elementary School, housing second through fourth grades, and Raynham Middle School, housing fifth through eighth grades. Bridgewater-Raynham Regional High School, located in Bridgewater, houses ninth through twelfth grades. The high school athletics teams are nicknamed the Trojans, and the primary colors are red and white, with blue trim. The BR School Committee consists of eight members. High school students may also attend West Bridgewater Middle-Senior High School, located in West Bridgewater, Bristol-Plymouth Regional Technical School, located in Taunton, or Bristol County Agricultural High School, located in Dighton. Students may also select to attend private and parochial schools in the neighboring towns, such as Bishop Feehan High School in Attleboro, or Cardinal-Spellman High School in Brockton.

In recent years, discussions have taken place regarding the possibility of the withdrawal of Raynham's three pre-kindergarten-eighth grade schools from the Bridgewater-Raynham Regional School District. The town cites an unfair funding formula, as well as Bridgewater's inability to fully fund the district, as its reasons for the proposal. However, on November 17, 2010, the proposal was unanimously defeated by voters at a special town meeting, thereby maintaining the current regional system.

== Recreation ==
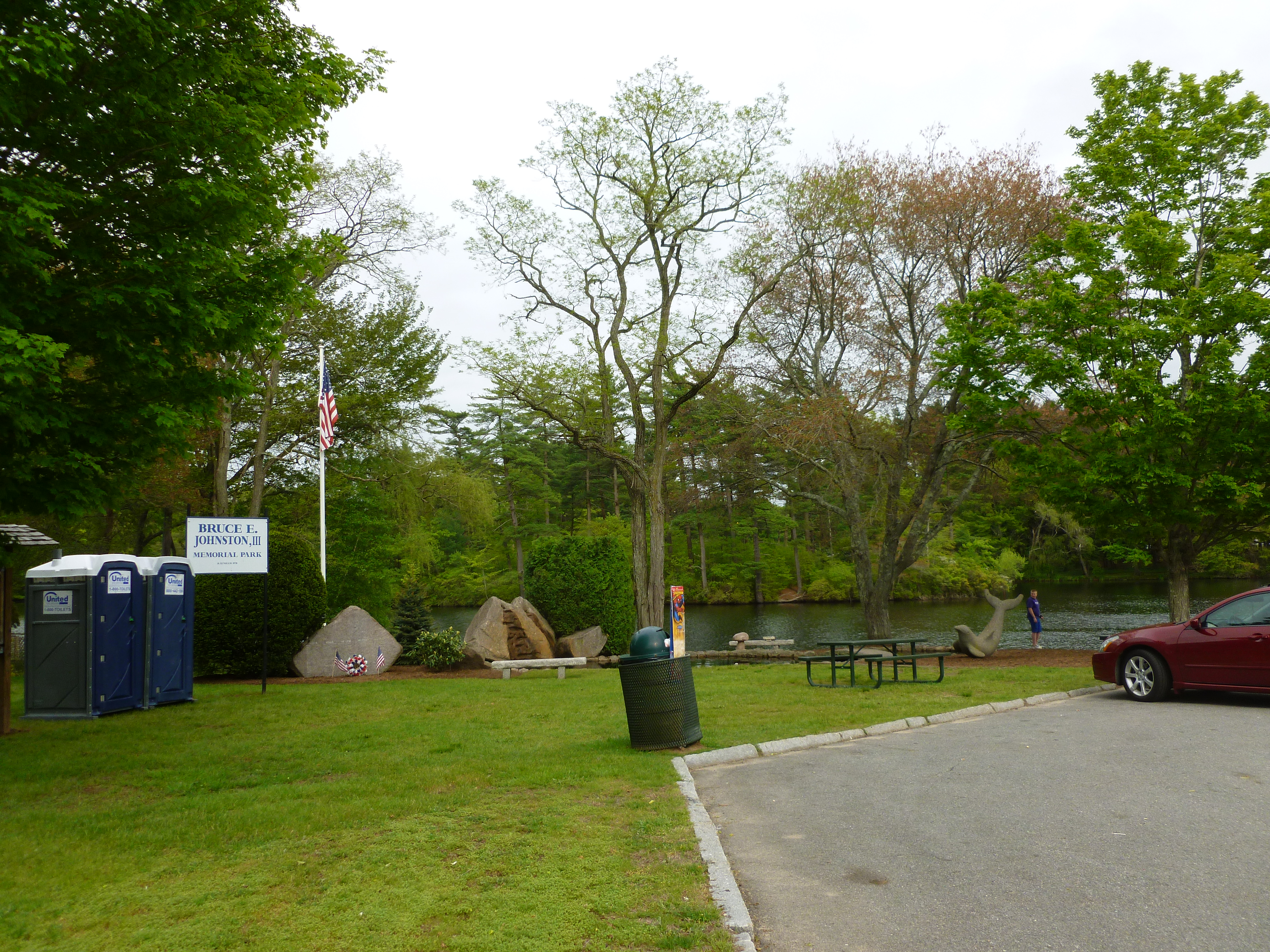
Johnston Memorial Park

Raynham Park is located in Raynham and holds the world record for largest annual handle. All racing at the park was formally ended on January 1, 2010, after the state election banned all greyhound racing due to the pass of the Massachusetts Greyhound Protection Act. The building remains to host simulcast racing. In 2011, the Wampanoag people indicated an interest in establishing a "Racino"-style gaming casino at the Raynham dog track, but in August 2011 talks broke down.

== Religion ==
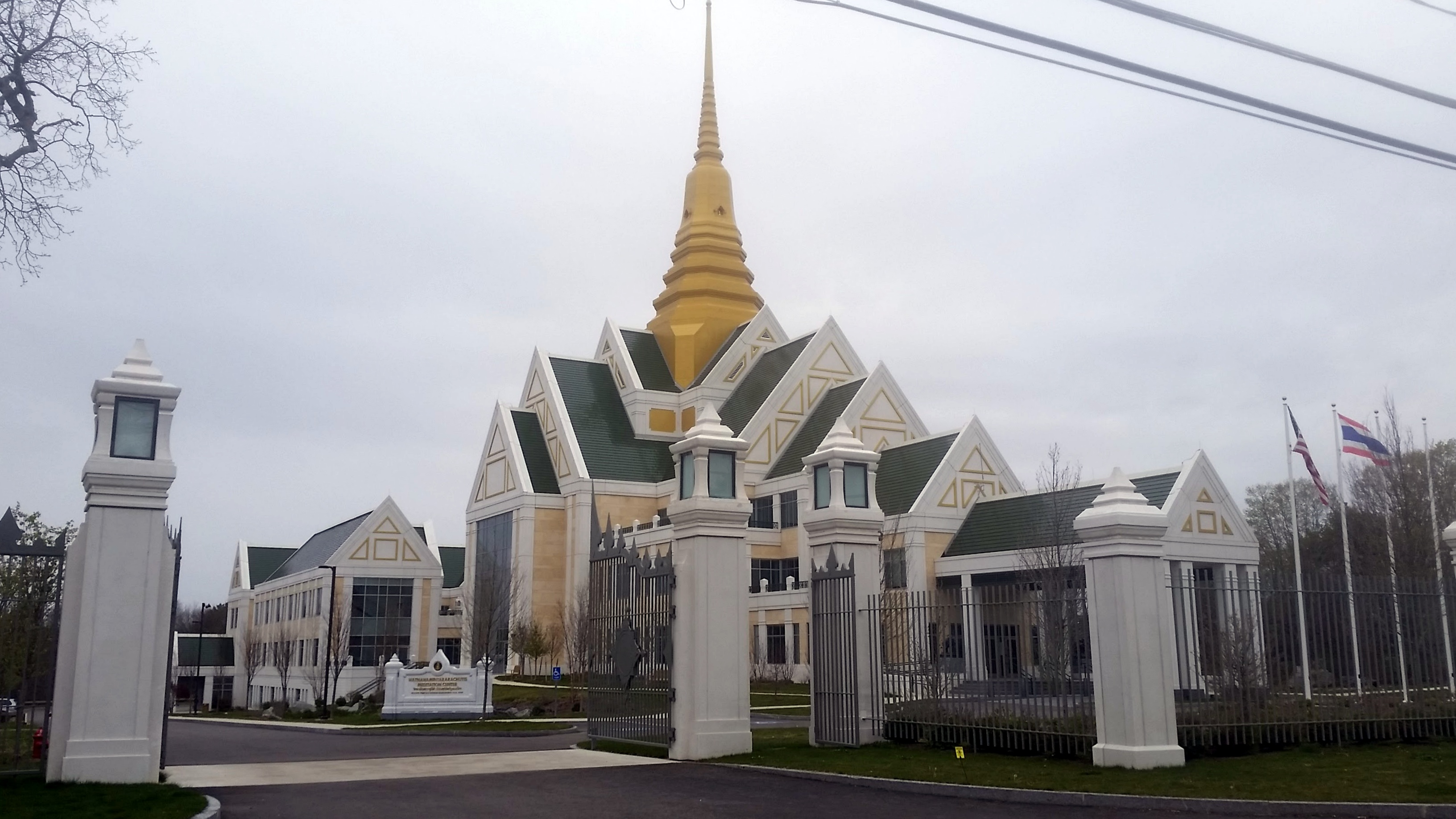
Wat Nawamintararachutis

Raynham is host to several religious organizations of various religious denominations. Among the largest is St. Ann's Roman Catholic Church, Steeple Point Church (Home to the Raynham Food Basket), Calvary Chapel contemporary evangelical church, Lutheran Church of the Way, First Congregational Stone Church, and Father's House Family Protestant Church. Raynham is also home to Wat Nawamintararachutis, opened in 2014 as the largest Thai Buddhist temple outside of Thailand.

== Notable people ==
- Frederick C. Anderson, received the United States military's highest decoration for valor, the Medal of Honor, for his action of capturing the battle flag of the 27th South Carolina regiment at the battle of Wheldon Railroad (also known as the Battle of Globe Tavern) near Petersburg, Virginia on September 6, 1864. Anderson was a member of the 18th Massachusetts Volunteer Regiment which was eventually transferred into the 32nd Regiment Massachusetts Volunteer Infantry which saw action in many of the major battles of the eastern campaign of the Civil War.
- Brody Bumila, baseball pitcher picked for the Texas Rangers in the 2026 draft
- Toby Gilmore, a former slave, volunteered in 1776 to serve in the Continental Army in place of his master who had been drafted. He served under General George Washington as tent master and is believed to have crossed the Delaware with him and spent the winter at Valley Forge
- Jared C. Monti, received the United States military's highest decoration for valor, the Medal of Honor, for his actions in Afghanistan attempting to rescue a wounded American soldier while under fire from enemy insurgents. Monti was killed in action in 2006 during this third attempt to rescue SPC Brian J. Bradbury. His actions are memorialized in the book "See You on the High Ground" written by Len Sandler, childhood friend of Monti's father. Also, the story of his father Paul C. Monti driving in Jared's truck after his death has been memorialized in the 2012 Country Western song "I Drive Your Truck" by Lee Brice. The song won The Academy of Country Music and The Country Music Association awards for Song of the Year.
- Gil Santos, the longtime radio play-by-play announcer for the New England Patriots of the National Football League

== See also ==
- Greater Taunton Area
- Taunton River
- Taunton River Watershed
