= Alvah Sabin =

American politician and clergyman (1793–1885)

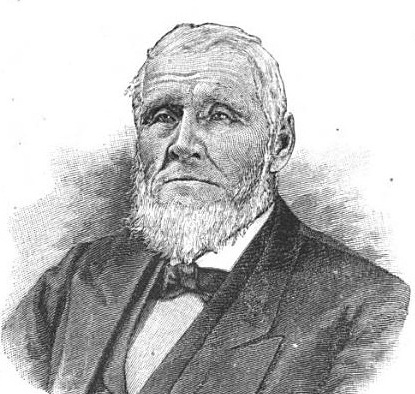

Member of the U.S. House of Representatives from Vermont's 3rd district
- In office March 4, 1853 – March 3, 1857
- Preceded by: James Meacham
- Succeeded by: Homer Elihu Royce

Secretary of State of Vermont
- In office 1841–1842
- Governor: Charles Paine
- Preceded by: Chauncey L. Knapp
- Succeeded by: James McMillan Shafter

Member of the Vermont House of Representatives
- In office 1826–1835; 1838–1840; 1847–1849; 1851; 1861–1862

Personal details
- Born: October 23, 1793 Georgia, Vermont, US
- Died: January 22, 1885 (aged 91) Sycamore, Illinois, US
- Party: Whig Party (United States)
- Spouse(s): Anna Mears and Susan Marsh
- Children: Benjamin F. Sabin, Julia A. Sabin, Harriet Amelia Sabin, Parthenia A. Sabin and Diantha Marie Sabin
- Profession: Politician, Minister (Christianity)

Alvah Sabin (October 23, 1793 – January 22, 1885) was an American politician and clergyman. He served as a United States representative from Vermont.

== Biography ==
Sabin was born in Georgia, Vermont, to Benjamin Sabin and Polly McMaster Sabin, and was educated in the common schools. He was also a member of the Vermont militia and served during the War of 1812. Sabin also attended the University of Vermont in Burlington, which awarded him the honorary degree of Master of Arts in 1826.

After the war, Sabin studied theology in Philadelphia and graduated from Columbian College (now George Washington University), Washington, D.C., in 1821. He was ordained a minister and preached at Cambridge, Westfield, and Underhill until 1825, when he returned to Georgia, Vermont. He was pastor of the Georgia Baptist Church for fifty-three years. Sabin was a member of the Vermont House of Representatives from 1826 to 1835, 1838 to 1840, 1847 to 1849, 1851, 1861 and 1862. He served in the Vermont Senate in 1841, 1843, and 1845. He was the Secretary of State of Vermont in 1841, and served as Probate Judge. He was a member of the Constitutional; Conventions of 1843 and 1850, and was Assistant Judge of the Franklin County Court from 1846 to 1852.

He was elected as a Whig to the Thirty-third Congress and reelected to the Thirty-fourth Congresses, serving from March 4, 1853, to March 3, 1857. While in Congress he served as chairman for the Committee on Revisal and Unfinished Business in the Thirty-fourth Congress. He was not a candidate for renomination in 1856. He served as a delegate to the first Anti-Slavery National Convention, and was the county commissioner of Franklin County, Vermont, in 1861 and 1862, responsible for curbing the buying and selling of alcoholic beverages. He moved to Sycamore, Illinois, in 1867 and continued his ministerial duties.

== Family life ==
Sabin married Anna Mears in 1819. They had five children together, Benjamin F. Sabin, Julia A. Sabin, Harriet Amelia Sabin, Parthenia A. Sabin and Diantha Marie Sabin. Following Anna's death, Sabin later married Susan Marsh.

== Death ==
Sabin died on January 22, 1885, in Sycamore. He is interred at Georgia Plains Cemetery in Georgia Plains, Vermont.

Political offices
Preceded by Chauncey L. Knapp	Secretary of State of Vermont; 1841–1842	Succeeded by James McMillan Shafter
U.S. House of Representatives
Preceded by James Meacham	Member of the U.S. House of Representatives from Vermont's 3rd congressional district 1853-1857	Succeeded by Homer E. Royce
