= Georgia Plain Baptist Church =

Historic church in Vermont, United States

- U.S. National Register of Historic Places
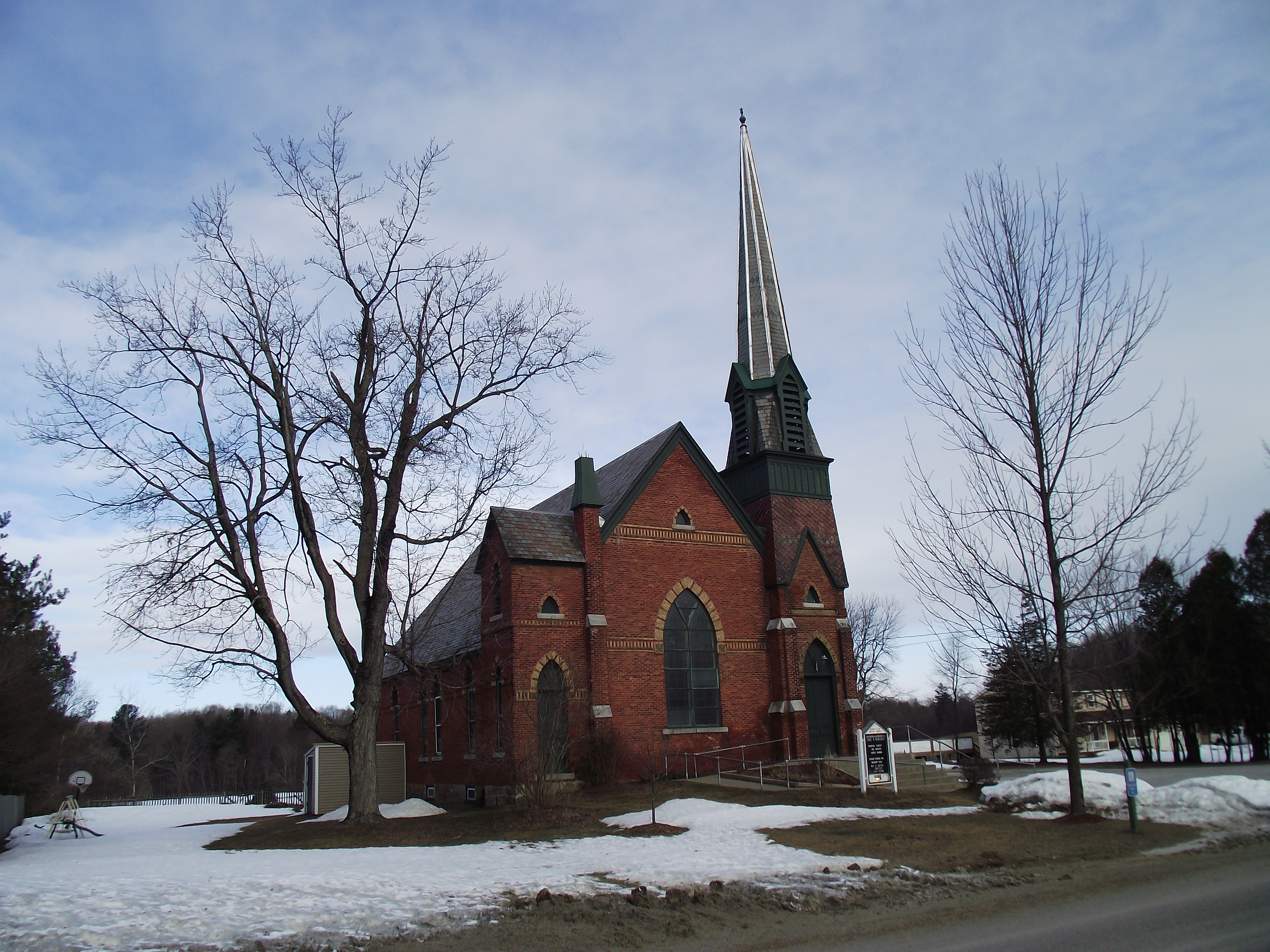

- Location within Vermont Location within the United States
- Location: 1493 Stonebridge Rd., Georgia, Vermont
- Coordinates: 44°43′15″N 73°10′2″W
- Area: less than one acre
- Built: 1877
- Architectural style: Gothic Revival
- MPS: Religious Buildings, Sites and Structures in Vermont MPS
- NRHP reference No.: 01000213
- Added to NRHP: March 2, 2001

The Georgia Plain Baptist Church is a historic church in Georgia, Vermont. Built in 1877 for a congregation established in 1793, it is a well-preserved example of High Gothic Victorian architecture. It was listed on the National Register of Historic Places in 2001. The congregation is affiliated with the American Baptist Churches of Vermont and New Hampshire.

== Description and history ==
The Georgia Plain Baptist Church stands in the rural crossroads village of Georgia Plains in southwestern Georgia, on the west side of Stonebridge Road near its junction with Plains Road. It is a single-story brick building, built out of red brick laid in English bond, with sand-colored brick trim. The main block has a steeply pitched gable roof, and is fronted by a three-part facade. The right element of the facade is the main tower, rising as a buttressed square to a louvered belfry at the base of the slate-clad steeple. The main entrance is in its base, set in a Gothic arched opening, with a small lancet window above. The left element of the facade is a lower gabled section, with a less ornate secondary entrance. The central part of the facade houses a large stained glass Gothic-arched window. The interior retains many original features, including carved woodwork, a pressed metal ceiling, and original lighting fixtures.

The Georgia Baptists were organized in 1793, and were the town's second religious congregation after the Congregationalists. They at first met for many years in Georgia's town hall, before building their first church at this site in 1848. That church burned down in 1876, and this church was completed the following year. The congregation is distinctive for ordaining the first female pastor of any denomination in the state of Vermont, Rev. Grace Brooks in 1919. The congregation's longest-serving and most influential minister was the Rev. Alvah Sabin, a Georgia native and United States Representative who was pastor for 53 years.

== See also ==
- National Register of Historic Places listings in Franklin County, Vermont
