= Henry Leonard =

Henry Leonard or Lennard may refer to:

- Centre Henry-Leonard
- Henry Leonard of Hay, New South Wales
- Henry Leonard, owner of Taunton Iron Works
- Henry Leonard, candidate in Colorado's 3rd congressional district
- Henry Lennard, 12th Baron Dacre (1570–1616), a politician.
- Sir Henry Lennard, 2nd Baronet (1859–1928), of the Lennard baronets

== See also ==
- Harry Leonard (disambiguation)
