= Georgia, Vermont =

- Town
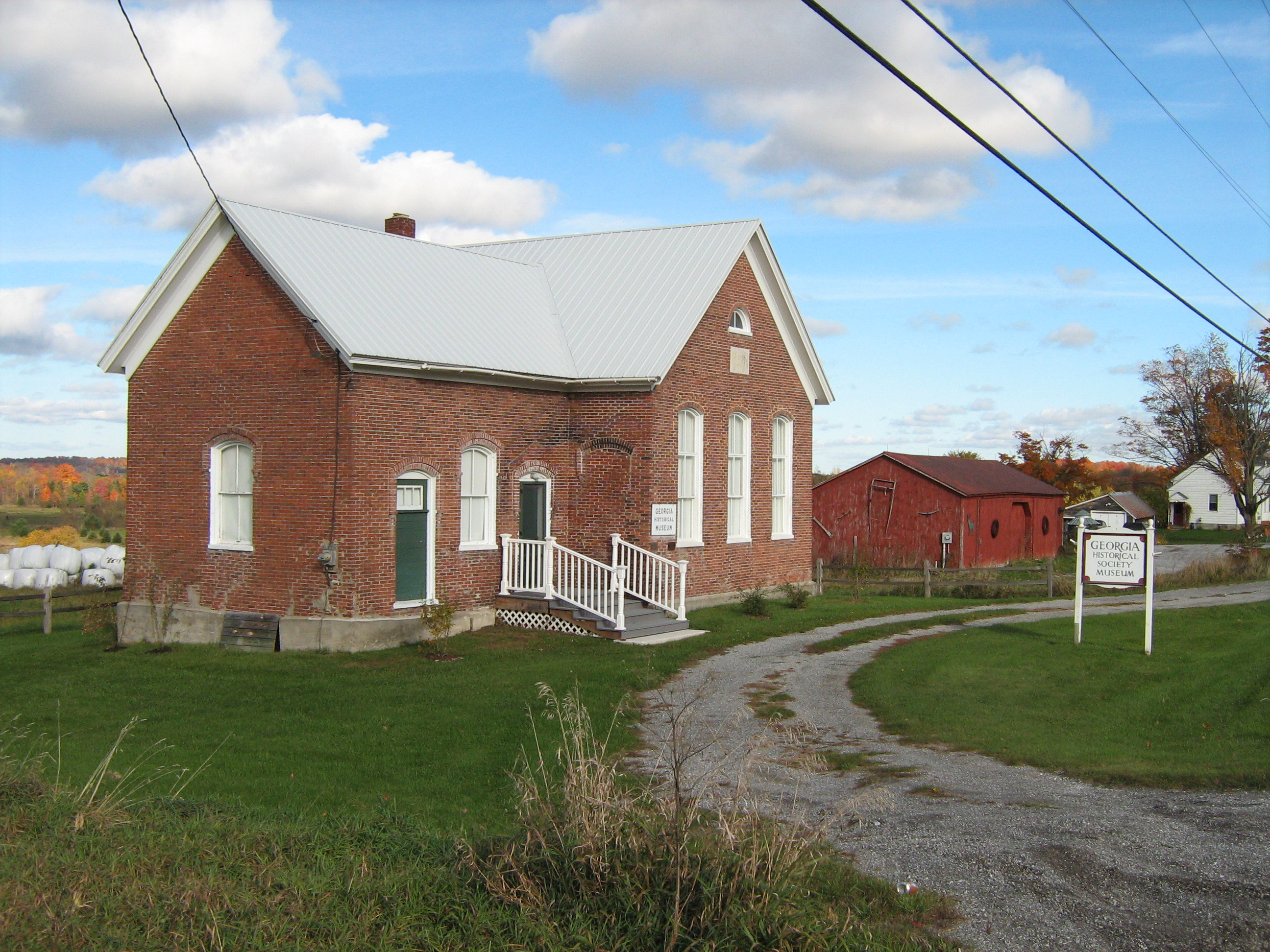
- District 8 School or "The Brick School" is now the Georgia Historical Society Museum

- Seal
- Motto: "Working Together"
- Location in Franklin County and the state of Vermont
- Coordinates: 44°44′42″N 73°07′40″W
- Country: United States
- State: Vermont
- County: Franklin
- Communities: Georgia Center; Georgia Plains; Hubbard Corner; Melville Landing; Oakland; West Georgia

Area
  - Total: 45.2 sq mi (117.1 km^{2})
  - Land: 39.3 sq mi (101.9 km^{2})
  - Water: 5.9 sq mi (15.3 km^{2})
- Elevation: 338 ft (103 m)

Population (2020)
  - Total: 4,845
  - Density: 123/sq mi (47.5/km^{2})
- Time zone: UTC-5 (Eastern (EST))
  - Summer (DST): UTC-4 (EDT)
- ZIP Codes: 05454 (Fairfax); 05468 (Milton); 05478 (St. Albans)
- Area code: 802
- FIPS code: 50-27700
- GNIS feature ID: 1462101
- Website: www.townofgeorgia.com

Georgia is a town in Franklin County, Vermont, United States. The population was 4,845 at the 2020 census.

== Geography ==
The town occupies the southwest corner of Franklin County, bordered to the south by Chittenden County. The western border of the town is within Lake Champlain and its St. Albans Bay. St. Albans, the Franklin County seat, is to the north. U.S. Route 7 passes through the town, as does Interstate 89, which crosses US-7 at Exit 18 in the southeast part of town. Both highways lead north to St. Albans and south to Burlington.

According to the United States Census Bureau, the town has a total area of 45.2 square miles (117.1 km^{2}), of which 39.3 square miles (101.9 km^{2}) is land and 5.9 square miles (15.3 km^{2}), or 13.03%, is water. The Lamoille River crosses the southeast corner of the town.

== History ==
Georgia was named after King George III by New Hampshire, which was meant to sway the king in a land dispute over Vermont between New York and New Hampshire, both of which claimed to have the rights to the land. During the War of 1812, smuggling was common throughout Vermont, except for Georgia, where the citizens formed a blockade to support the embargo on Canadian goods. The blockade was so functional that smugglers started to call Georgia "Hell's Gate".

== Demographics ==
Historical population
Census	Pop.	Note	%±
1790	340		—
1800	1,068		214.1%
1810	1,760		64.8%
1820	1,703		−3.2%
1830	1,897		11.4%
1840	2,106		11.0%
1850	2,686		27.5%
1860	1,547		−42.4%
1870	1,603		3.6%
1880	1,504		−6.2%
1890	1,282		−14.8%
1900	1,280		−0.2%
1910	1,090		−14.8%
1920	1,075		−1.4%
1930	1,090		1.4%
1940	1,008		−7.5%
1950	1,055		4.7%
1960	1,079		2.3%
1970	1,711		58.6%
1980	2,818		64.7%
1990	3,753		33.2%
2000	4,375		16.6%
2010	4,515		3.2%
2020	4,845		7.3%
U.S. Decennial Census

As of the census of 2000, there were 4,375 people, 1,484 households, and 1,231 families residing in the town. The population density was 110.8 people per square mile (42.8/km^{2}). There were 1,654 housing units at an average density of 41.9 per square mile (16.2/km^{2}). The racial makeup of the town was 98.31% White, 0.25% African American, 0.16% Native American, 0.25% Asian, 0.02% Pacific Islander, 0.23% from other races, and 0.78% from two or more races. Hispanic or Latino of any race were 0.57% of the population.

There were 1,484 households, out of which 46.2% had children under the age of 18 living with them, 72.1% were couples living together and joined in either marriage or civil union, 7.4% had a female householder with no husband present, and 17.0% were non-families. 12.3% of all households were made up of individuals, and 4.2% had someone living alone who was 65 years of age or older. The average household size was 2.94 and the average family size was 3.20.

In the town, the population was spread out, with 31.2% under the age of 18, 5.9% from 18 to 24, 34.1% from 25 to 44, 22.7% from 45 to 64, and 6.1% who were 65 years of age or older. The median age was 34 years. For every 100 females, there were 101.7 males.

The median income for a household in the town was $54,156, and the median income for a family was $59,712. Males had a median income of $37,294 versus $26,090 for females. The per capita income for the town was $20,888. About 1.9% of families and 3.8% of the population were below the poverty line, including 2.8% of those under age 18 and 9.0% of those age 65 or over.

== Education ==
The town is in the Franklin West Supervisory Union.

== Notable people ==
- J. Allen Barber (1809–1881), politician
- Daniel Bliss (1823–1916), missionary; founder of American University of Beirut
- Jeffrey Brace (1742–1827), American Revolutionary War, Black Patriot soldier
- Gardner Quincy Colton (1814–1898), scientist
- James M. Hotchkiss (1812–1877), member of the Vermont House of Representatives and Vermont Senate
- Martha Austin Phelps (1870–1933), chemist
- Hester Martha Poole (1833/1834–1932), writer, artist, advocate
- Alvah Sabin (1793–1885), US congressman
- George J. Stannard (1820–1886), farmer, teacher, Civil War general
- Armando Vilaseca, commissioner of the Vermont Department of Education
- Mehitable E. Woods (1813–1891), hero of the American Civil War
