= Jack Sisson =

American militiaman

- Born: Jack Sisson c. 1743
- Died: 1821
- Military career
- Allegiance: Rhode Island
- Branch: Continental Army
- Unit: 1st Rhode Island Regiment
- Conflicts: American Revolutionary War

Jack Sisson (c. 1743—1821) was an enslaved African American who sided with the Patriots and served in the 1st Rhode Island Regiment during the American Revolutionary War. Sisson was one of the key figures in the July 1777 capture of British General Richard Prescott. Sisson was among about forty troops under the command of Colonel William Barton, who traversed British-controlled waters to sneak up and capture Prescott. Sisson served as the pilot for one of the boats and used his head to break down Prescott's door. The mission was accomplished without losses.
