= Silas Royal =

18th-century Black Patriot)

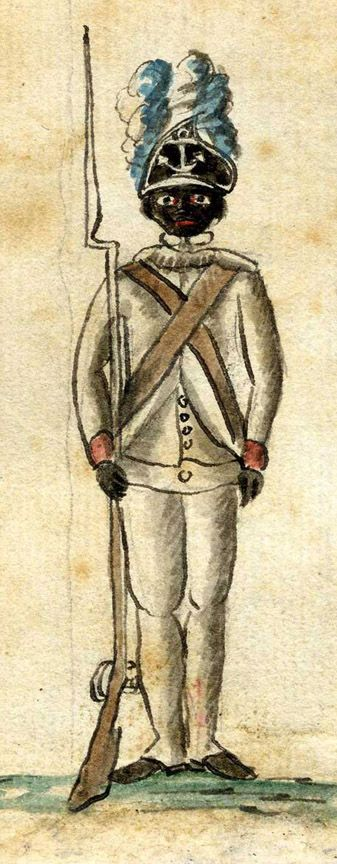
A member of the 1st Rhode Island Regiment

Silas Royal (1740s–1826), originally known as Silas Varnum and sometimes written as Ryal Varnum, was an enslaved person and black patriot in the Revolutionary War. Though bought as an infant slave for the Varnum family, he was eventually set free and fought in the Continental Army and as an American privateer.

== Varnum Family ==
Silas Varnum was raised by the Varnum family of Dracut, Massachusetts, to be the servant of young J.B. Varnum. The family had unorthodox views on the institution of slavery and the role of African Americans in colonial society, and would advocate for black soldiers to serve in the army during the war. J.B. Varnum developed a strong friendship with Silas, and later wrote the bill in Congress banning the slave trade.

When Silas reached adulthood, the patriarch of the Varnums decided to set him free. As a freedman Silas could have left the Varnum estate, but chose to stay and work as a paid servant. He took the name "Silas Royal" to celebrate his liberation.

== War Service ==
When hostilities broke out Royal joined the provisional army around Boston. James Mitchell Varnum, brother of Royal's former owner, was assigned to command "Varnum's Regiment" by the Rhode Island assembly. Royal joined the regiment as a trusted servant to General Varnum and developed a dignified reputation. Varnum's Regiment saw action at the Battle of Bunker Hill and would eventually become the 1st Rhode Island, the only regiment in the Continental Army consisting of a majority of African American and Native American soldiers.

Later, Royal served as a privateer aboard the Franklin, one of several small ships disrupting British supply lines during the continuing Siege of Boston. This was a dangerous and sometimes lucrative posting, and Royal once drew £30 as his share of prize money after a voyage. Marines from the Marblehead Regiment, many of them also black, were attached to this vessel. Royal may have joined the Marblehead mariners at the Delaware Crossing.

== Kidnapping ==
In 1778, a dispute arose between Silas Royal and a shipmate over the prize money Royal was entitled from a captured merchant ship. The privateer abducted Royal and stole his wages, then claimed to be his master and sold Royal to John White, a slave dealer in Woburn. Both men ignored Royal's freedom papers.

Royal was in danger of being sent to the South to work and sold into plantation work. Handcuffed, he was imprisoned in a wagon on the road from Cambridge to Waltham. Royal called for help, but White drove the wagon drove quickly and no one on foot was able to give pursuit. Luckily, the Varnum family learned of the kidnapping in time and organized a posse to ride to Royal's rescue.

John White, who knew Silas Royal was a free man, falsely claimed that Royal was a deserter and a thief who had stolen supplies from an army quartermaster. J.B. Varnum used his political standing to appeal to the authorities and was successful in securing Royal's release. The Varnums went so far as to report White's conduct to his superiors in Boston, leading to a tense confrontation.

He was extremely angry, Curst & Swore very Profainly, they dealt him very sharply for his Conduct to Ryal. He said he did not know Ryal was free. They told him that he could not know that his Crime alleged against Ryal for which he was put in Gaol was true, but that he knew ye Contrary. He said all such Damd Neagroes ought to be slaves. They told him that Ryal was as Good a man, & of as much honour as he, at which he was extremely angry & profain. Laid his hand on his Hanger by his side. They told him that they had seen Hangers & men before they had seen him or his, that they was ready to answer him any way he pleased, that they could not forget his Conduct towards Ryal, that they on sd Ryal's Behalfe should bring an action of Damage for false Imprisonment, that such arbitrary Tyrants & menstealers should not go unpunished.

Afterwards, J.B. Varnum helped Royal file a lawsuit against White. The court eventually ruled in Royal's favor and awarded him £100 in damages.

== Later life ==
Afterwards, Royal returned to the Varnum household and lived as a free man for the remainder of his years. In his will, J.B. Varnum left instructions that Royal be cared for "and honorably buried after death." Silas died on May 3, 1826. Silas was buried in the Varnum family cemetery in Dracut.
