= Toby Gilmore =

Toby Gilmore (c. 1742/47 – 19 April 1812) was born in coastal West Africa (an area then known as Guinea (region)) as Shibodee Turrey Wurry, the son of a local chieftain. He was kidnapped at the age of sixteen by slave traders. Later, he would regain his freedom by enlisting in the Continental Army during the American Revolution.

== Early life ==
Around 1758, Shibodee Turrey Wurry was kidnapped by slave traders while collecting coconuts and placed in chains below deck aboard the slave ship Dove. This ship bound for Virginia had to change course because it was damaged during a storm, sailing to Rhode Island instead. There, he was auctioned off and purchased by sea captain John Gilmore of Raynham, Massachusetts. According to local legend, John and his wife had no children and renamed Shibodee to Toby Gilmore, teaching him to read and write. However, this has proven untrue; the couple had several children, and it is unclear if Toby could read and write.

== American Revolutionary War ==
During the American Revolutionary War, Toby was attached to military companies that served at Battle of Monmouth, Battle of Forts Clinton and Montgomery, Battle of White Plains, West Point, Siege of Fort Ticonderoga (1777) and the Winter at Valley Forge.

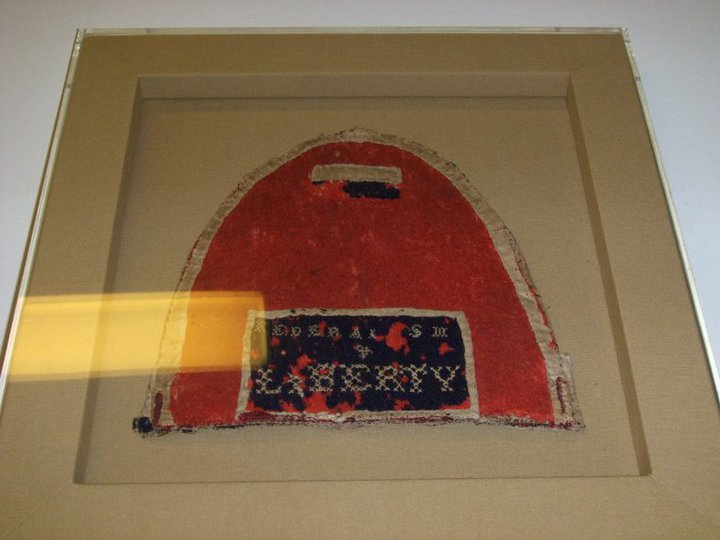
Military Mitre of Toby Gilmore embroidered with the words FEDERALISM AND LIBERTY

Toby began his service on 8 December 1776 as a private in Captain Jonathan Shaw's company, Colonel George Williams's Regiment (3rd Bristol Co.) He served for eleven days. The company marched to Warren, RI, on an alarm. 4 November 1777, he joined Capt. James Cooper's company, Col. Gamaliel Bradfords's 12th Regt. After that, his Continental Army pay records show he served from 19 September 1777 to 3 September 1780; he was enlisted for three years. In 1781, he served for two months and 24 days at North River (Hudson River). He was discharged from the army in December 1781 and returned home to Raynham. Afterward, he served during Shays' Rebellion; his mitre was embroidered with the Federalist logo. Some of the records for him are missing local history/legend has linked him with Gen. George Washington.

=== Lore of George Washington ===
It is unknown whether or not Gilmore served under Gen. Washington. Local history of the Greater Taunton area states that Toby, during the war, rose in the ranks to the position of "bodyguard " or "body servant" of George Washington. For his service, he was awarded a cannon, that today resides at Old Colony Historical Society (OCHS) in Taunton, Massachusetts nicknamed "Old Toby". Every 4 July in celebration, Toby would fire the cannon 14 times; 13 of these shots were fired for the original Thirteen Colonies, and the last shot would be fired to honor Gen. Washington. Some have made claims that Toby is the African American pictured in Emanuel Gottlieb Leutze's 1851 oil painting Washington Crossing the Delaware. Popular belief today is that the figure was Prince Whipple; however, it is documented that Whipple and his enslaver were in Baltimore at the time of the crossing. It may be that Leutze wanted to express that black patriots fought alongside their white counterparts during the Revolutionary War and that the image of the soldier in the painting is not of anyone in particular but embodies all Black Patriots.

== Freedom after the war ==
By the end of his service, Toby was married to Rosanna Hack. They would have eight children: Toby Jr., Nancy, Delia, Timothy, Esquire, Selina, Rosina, and Seabury. Toby returned and worked for his former enslaver. Later, he and his wife started their own housekeeping business. Toby was considered to be a frugal businessman and purchased forty-five acres and sixty rods (18.4 hectares) of confiscated land in Raynham, Mass. The land was seized from a loyalist and auctioned off. Toby was so well-liked in the area that very few prospectors bid against him.

The first house he built about 1784 still stands in Raynham. In 1798, he made his second homestead that was larger than his former enslaver's home.

Toby died 19 April 1812, at the age of 70, according to his grave marker that still stands at Hall & Dean Cemetery in West Raynham.

== Old Colony Historical Society ==
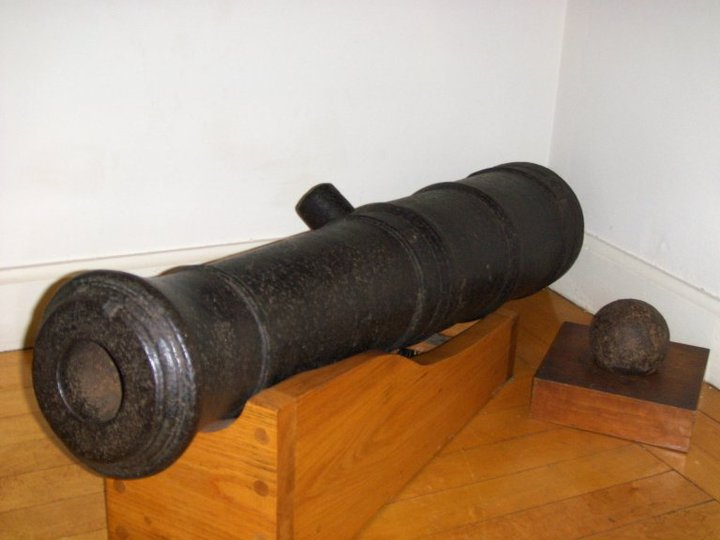
"Old Toby" Canon at The Old Colony Historical Society Taunton Mass.

Most of Tobias Gilmore's history can be found at OCHS, where local historians keep some of his artifacts. These artifacts include his military mitre, "Old Toby" the canon, and his rundlet all on display. The archives have a military coat that the Gilmore family also donated. It is unclear exactly what period the coat comes from, but it is unlikely that it was Toby's. It is speculated that it comes from one of his descendants and is an American Civil War-era coat.

The Taunton Daily Gazette on 24 October 1921, did a short article stating that Caroline J. Gilmore, the last member of the Gilmore line, had died that morning. It was believed that all of Toby's Gilmore descendants had died out. In the summer of 2010, OCHS staff and one of the Gilmore descendants rediscovered the missing genealogical link. The article was printed on 20 October 2010 in the Taunton Daily Gazette.

In 2021 The Toby Gilmore Story, a play written by the playwright and actor Stephen Sampson and produced by Greater Joy Production, depicted scenes from Toby's life during the war. The play was performed at OCHS.
