= Martha Austin Phelps =

Martha Austin Phelps was an American chemist who conducted research in measuring metal concentrations and developed several analytical protocols to do so. She also worked on the early development of ester synthesis. In between conducting research, she worked as school teacher teaching chemistry and physics. She finished her career as an activist in women's academic clubs. Her chemistry career lasted approximately 10 years, resulting in 15 publications, which set her apart as one of the most skilled female chemists within the first generation of women chemists in the United States.

== Biography ==
Martha was born in Georgia, Vermont on February 13, 1870. She grew up in Easthampton, Massachusetts where she graduated high school. She earned her B.S. degree from Smith College in 1892. Prior to enrolling in graduate school at Yale University, she taught as a science teacher in New York and Massachusetts. She started graduate school in 1896 and graduated with her Ph.D. in chemistry in 1898. After completing her Ph.D., she continued working for her Ph.D. advisor, Andrew Gooch in the Kent Chemistry Laboratory for one year and then transferred to the Rhode Island Experiment Station where she worked as an assistant chemist in 1900. From 1901 to 1904, she went back to being a science teacher and taught chemistry and physics at Wilson College. In 1904, she also married Issac King Phelps, who was working as a chemistry instructor at Yale and George Washington University at the time. In 1908, the couple moved to Washington D.C. where Martha went to work for the Bureau of Standards as a chemistry researcher and Issac went to work for the U.S. Department of Agriculture. Martha ceased working as researcher in 1909. Martha was one of the first female scientists to be employed by the Bureau of Standards. After 1909, she began her activist work in women's education clubs until retirement. Martha and Issac lived in Washington D.C until 1923, until they moved to New Haven, Connecticut where Martha eventually died on March 15, 1933.

== Work in Science ==
Martha spent much of her scientific career interested in the quantitative analysis of various elements. Specifically, she studied the composition of ammonium phosphates in magnesium, zinc, and cadmium. Her study of ammonium phosphates was later used as a tool in her later analytical work. Martha spent much of her research career developing several analytical procedures for metal estimations and separations, with a special focus on gravimetric estimations of manganese and magnesium. Her other work included the analysis of prehistoric bronzes without major disruption to the metal composition and the study of organic esters.

While in graduate school at Yale, she worked for Andrew Gooch in the Kent Chemical Laboratory. Throughout her time in graduate school, she published nine papers in the American Journal of Science and in Zeitschrift für anorganische und allgemeine Chemie for her work in analytical chemistry. Four of the nine papers she published individually and the other five in collaboration with Gooch. After her marriage to Issac King Phelps in 1904, she collaborated with her husband to study ester synthesis. The work resulted in six more publications. In total, she published fifteen papers throughout the span of her ten-year career as a chemist.

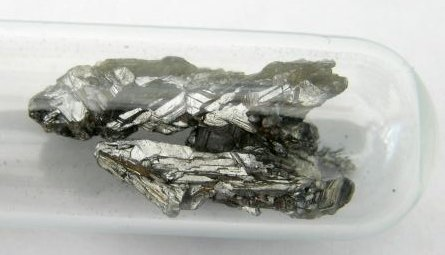
Image of elemental arsenic.

Martha's work is primarily recognized for her development of a protocol estimating arsenic as ammonium magnesium arsenate. The paper detailing the procedure was published in 1900. The protocol became a standard method of arsenic estimation in quantitative analysis studies and was written into textbooks for several years.

== Awards ==
From 1897 to 1898, she was granted a graduate scholarship to pursue her PhD. Upon completion of her PhD, she was granted one of Yale's University Fellowships to continue work in Gooch's laboratory until 1899.
