= Harry Leonard =

Harry Leonard may refer to:

- Harry Ward Leonard (1861–1915), electrical engineer and inventor
- Harry Leonard (footballer, 1886–1951), English football forward
- Harry M. Leonard (1900–1985), American sound mixer
- Harry Leonard (rugby union) (born 1992), Scottish rugby union player
- Harry Leonard (footballer, born 2003), English football forward for Blackburn Rovers
- Harold Leonard (conductor), conductor of the Waldorf–Astoria Orchestra

== See also ==
- Henry Leonard (disambiguation)
