= Mehitable E. Woods =

American Civil War Hero

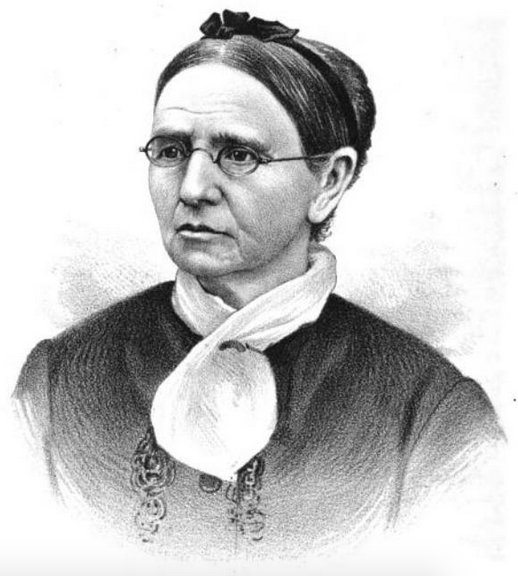
Mehitable E. Woods

Major Mehitable E. Woods (nickname, "Auntie Woods"; also known as Mehitable Ellis Woods; September 28, 1813 – 1891) was a hero of the American Civil War and a pioneer of Jefferson County, Iowa. Gov. Samuel J. Kirkwood commissioned her as a Major.

== Early life and education ==
Mehitable (nickname, "Hetty") E. Owen was born on the banks of Lake Champlain, in Georgia, Vermont, September 28, 1813. She was the youngest of seven children (five surviving) born to Julius and Mehitable "Hettie" (Cassel) Owen.

Her father was a native of Salisbury, Connecticut, and an uncle of Ethan Allen, of American Revolution fame. Her family was of Welsh origin and descended from one of two brothers who came to the United States during Colonial days, and who took an active part in the American Revolutionary War. Her grandfather, Owen, was a man of remarkable longevity, having lived more than 100 years. The father emigrated from Connecticut to Vermont, where he married Miss Cassel, a lady of French origin, her people having come to this country with Gen. LaFayette. She died in Vermont, and the husband married again. Following the example of his Revolutionary ancestors, he served in the War of 1812. Having removed westward to Harvard, Illinois, he there spent his last days, attaining almost the age of one hundred years.

Woods received a very limited education. Her mother having died when she was quite small and her father marrying again, at the age of twelve years, she went to live in the home of a Mr. Mears, a Deacon in the Congregational church, thus to make a living with her own hands. Later, she went to the home of a sister, with whom she moved to New York City.

== Career ==
=== Marriages ===
In the early 1830s, she married Howard Cooper, possibly in Bombay, New York but they divorced. About 1835, she joined a sister in Harvard, Illinois where she met and married Gilbert M. Fox, a native of Ohio. He was of English descent, and a carpenter by trade. In 1839, they started for Fairfield, Iowa, arriving on the day of the first election in this city, June 27. Mr. Fox purchased a lot and the following year, erected the house in which Mrs. Woods later lived, which was then known as the "big house." He was a first-class mechanic and erected many dwellings for the early settlers, besides assisting in the erection of the first courthouse. The first house, however, in which they lived was a primitive log dwelling with a stick chimney. Mr. Fox died in 1844.

Three years later, she married Parish Ellis, an early settler, and also a mechanic. He died in 1851.

In 1857, she wed Joel Woods, a tailor by trade. In 1858, he went to Colorado and engaged in mining, and so earned the esteem of his fellow miners that he was elected to the Legislature. While hunting in Arizona, he was shot and killed by mistake. His remains were buried at Ft. Whipple.

=== Civil War ===
Though left alone in the world, Woods found a broad and useful field for her activities. The Civil War at length commenced and several severe battles were fought. The Iowa soldiers, sick and wounded, had been sent to the hospital at Keokuk, Iowa, and realizing how much they needed someone to take the place of a mother, she sacrificed her personal interests and gave her time and best efforts to the work of alleviating the sufferings of Iowa's soldiers, especially those from Jefferson County.

Backed by the loyal women at home, she did a work that was remembered by the soldiers and spoken of at their reunions. On April 3, 1862, she took a quantity of sanitary supplies to distribute among the sick and wounded in the hospital at Keokuk, where she remained during the greater part of the summer to care for the afflicted troops. Having received three passes —one from Gen. Samuel Ryan Curtis, for the department of the Northwest; the second, from Gen. George Henry Thomas, and the third from the War Department, she made nine trips, taking cargoes that varied from 10 to 37 tons. In November, 1862, she started with the first supplies to Springfield, Missouri, but finding it impracticable for her to go farther, she placed her stores in charge of another at St. Louis and returned.

In March 1863, she started with a large cargo for Missouri and ministered to the Third Iowa Cavalry, at Pilot Knob, and the Fourth Iowa Cavalry, at Helena, Arkansas. Soon afterward, she made her first trip down the Mississippi River into the heart of the Confederacy. Her plan was to travel incognito, letting her business be known only to the proper authorities. When asked where she was going, she would reply: "To see my sons, all of whom are in the army." Though she had no son, she was a mother to many, and the Iowa boys learned to call her by that name.

To show how extensive was the field over which she operated, the dates of transportation to a number of the places visited include the following:

- Little Rock, Arkansas, March 14, 1864
- Chattanooga, Tennessee, May 16, 1864
- Memphis, Tennessee, November 23, 1864
- Milliken's Bend, Louisiana, in April, 1865

In the rear of the Vicksburg campaign, she was twice under fire, but escaped uninjured. Her last trip was made under the auspices of the United States Sanitary Commission, as a Sanitary Commission agent. With 37 tons of supplies, she proceeded to New Orleans, there to take a boat for Baraucus Island, off the coast of Louisiana. A sanitary officer advised her not to venture, saying that she could not reach her destination and that the vessel in which she was going was unsafe. If she would turn over her stores to him, he would see to their proper distribution. Mrs. Woods insisted upon going, whereupon he became irate and said she should not, but she replied that she had a pass from the Government. The officer then went so far as to say that she could not go if she "had a pass from Heaven," but when she showed the document and said no power on earth should keep her from going, the argument was done. Arriving at the island, she found her assistance much needed. Several thousands of disabled soldiers were left there, while the able-bodied went to assist in the capture of Mobile, Alabama. Mrs. Woods remained a month, and on Christmas Day, had one of the most enjoyable meals ever served, consisting of the crackers and fresh butter taken from Iowa and the large fresh oysters gathered from the ocean.

== Later life ==
After the war, Woods led a quiet life, unconscious of the great honors and gratitude she had won. She was an honorary member of several societies including: Order of the Eastern Star, A. F. & A. H.; Rebecca Degree, I. O. O. F.; the Grand Army of the Republic (G.A.R.(; Agassiz Society, and the Alethean Literary Society, of Parsons College. The Fairfield Hose Company was named in her honor, and to its members, she gave a royal banquet each year. In 1886, she was a State delegate to the G.A.R.'s National Encampment at San Francisco. Unknown and unsolicited on her part, her friends secured for her a pension of US$25 per month.

For 51 years, Woods was a resident of Fairfield, Iowa. She died in 1891. An 11 feet (3.4 m) high granite memorial is located at the Old Fairfield Cemetery where she is buried in Fairfield, Iowa.
