= Taunton Iron Works =

Coordinates: 41.9141°N 71.0617°W

Depiction of Iron Works on Rayhnam Town Seal, hailed as "First Iron Works in America". It was actually the first iron works in what was then Plymouth Colony, built several years after Saugus and Braintree.

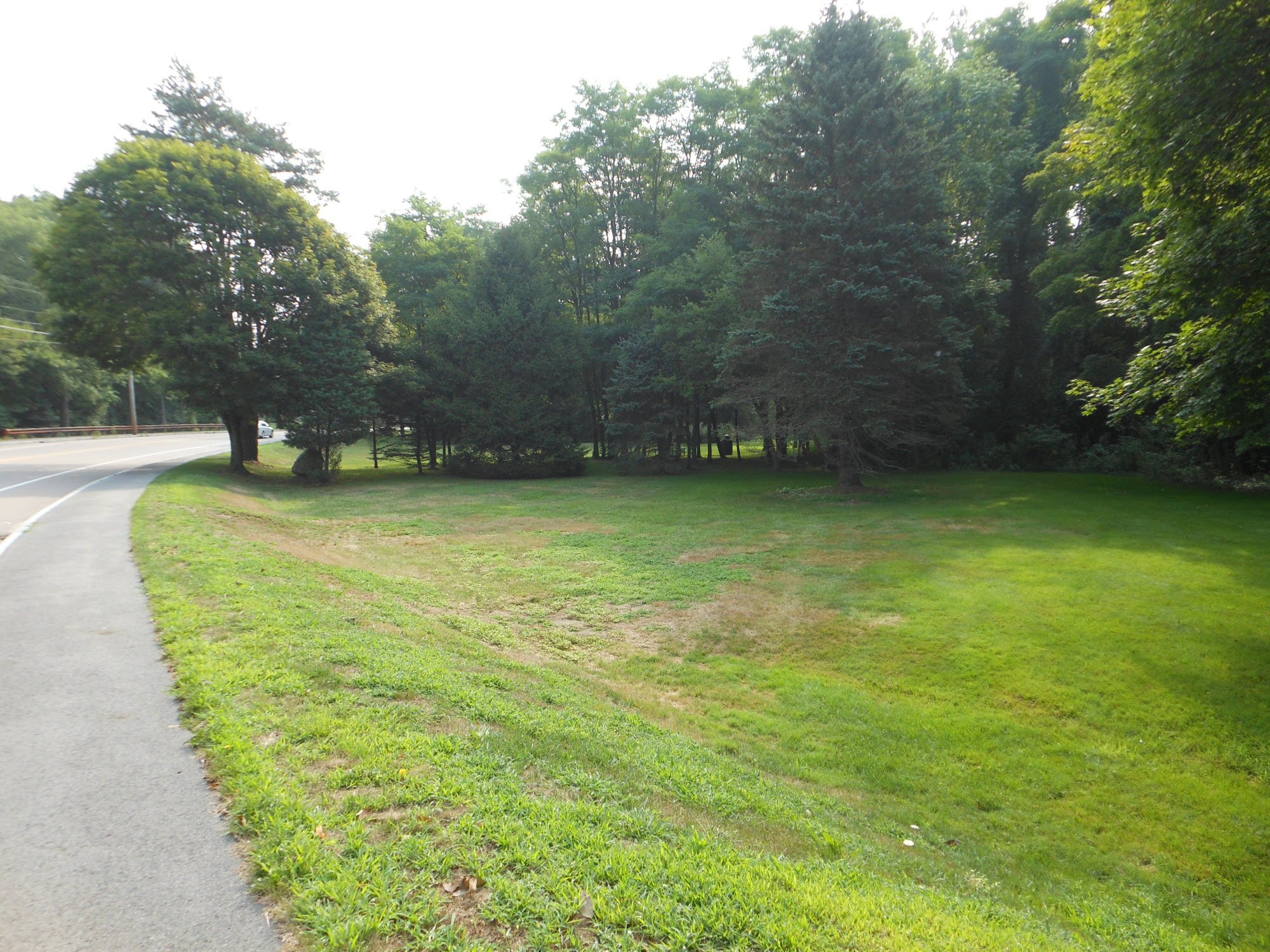
Site of Taunton Iron Works

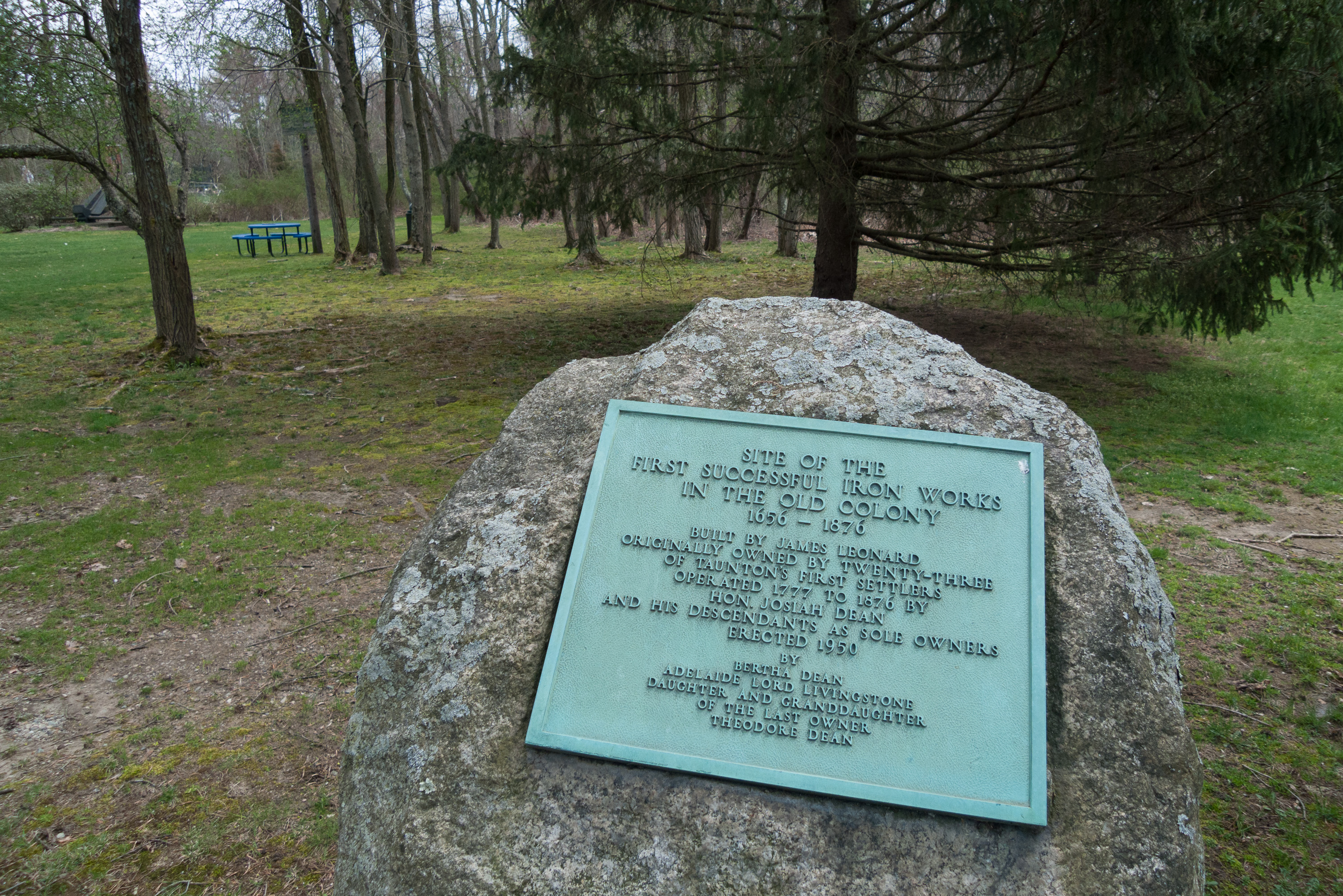
Plaque at the site

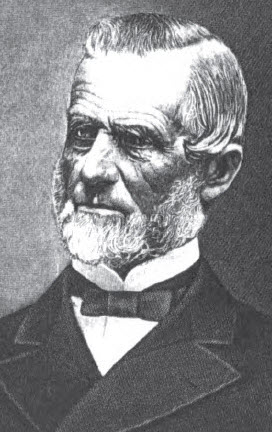
Theodore Dean, the last owner of the iron works

The Taunton Iron Works (also known as Leonard Iron Works) was located on the banks of the Forge River in what is now Raynham, Massachusetts. It was the first iron works established in Plymouth Colony, and only the third in New England. Much more successful than earlier works at Saugus, and Braintree, it operated for a remarkable period of two hundred and twenty years, from 1656 (369 years ago) to 1876 (149 years ago).

== History ==
On October 21, 1652, after the discovery of large amounts of bog ore in the area, residents of Taunton voted to establish an iron works in their town. The town invited brothers Henry and James Leonard and Ralph Russell, experienced iron men who had worked at the works in Braintree to come to Taunton to set up a works on the Two Mile River. The Leonard brothers had emigrated from Pontypool, Wales to work at the iron works in Lynn (Saugus), and later at Braintree. The Town of Taunton offered the ironmasters land in exchange for help establishing the works. However, only James Leonard remained in Taunton to take advantage of the town's offer. Henry Leonard returned to Lynn in 1655. He later established a works at Rowley in 1668. However, this works was not successful. Henry Leonard later moved to New Jersey, where he and his sons established successful works. Ralph Russell also did not remain in Taunton, instead moving to Dartmouth where he set up a forge at what became known as Russells Mills, on the Paskamanset River.

A joint-stock company was established by the town, and shares were sold to many members of the community, as well as a few individuals in other surrounding places. James Leonard, owned 1/2 share of the works. These members included "Hezekiah HOARE, Thomas GILBERT, Richard WILLIAMS, Walter DEAN, George HALL, Oliver PURCHIS, James WALKER, John TISDALL, Wm. PARKER, Mr. GILBERT senr: Peter PITTS, Richard STACEY, John COBB, William HODGES, Nath’l WOODWARD, Timothy HOLLOWAY, James BURT, Edward BOBETT, Jonah AUSTIN, sen’r, John PARKER, Samuel WILBORE, Miss E. POLE, Jane POLE ... William POLE, Timothy LINDALL of Salem, his son-in-law, Nicholas WHITE, senr., Richard STEPHENS, John TURNER, Thomas LINCOLN, senr., Anthony SLOCUM, James LEONARD, Thos. ARMSBERY, Joseph WILBORE, Henry ANDREWS, John HALL, James PHILLIPS, Francis SMITH, Geo. WATSON, Gov. LEVERETT and Major Edward TYNG of Boston, Nath’l PAINE, senr., and Stephen PAINE, Jr., of Bristol, Benedict ARNOLD of Newport, Richard THAYER of Braintree, contributing from £20 to £5 each, for whole, half and quarter shares."

Operation of the works began in 1656. Consisting of a two-hearth water-powered bloomery, it produced bar iron directly from ore, yielding about 20 to 30 tons annually. George Hall served as the first clerk and manager until his death in 1669. This position was later held successively by his son John Hall, Henry Andrews and Israel Dean. In 1683, Captain Thomas Leonard became manager, a position he held until his death in 1713. Deacon Samuel Leonard next operated the works until he died in 1745.

In 1731, the works became part of the town of Raynham, Massachusetts, upon the division of that town from Taunton. In 1771, the works was acquired by Josiah Dean, who converted the site into a rolling and nail works. Upon Dean's death in 1818, ownership of the works was transferred his son Eliab B. Dean. In 1825, it was converted into an anchor forge. Theodore Dean, son of Eliab, was the last operator of the works, which closed in 1876.

== Legacy ==
James Leonard later established a works on the Mill River in Taunton in 1670. Operation of the Whittenton works continued by Leonard’s sons and grandsons for over one hundred years. It is now the site of the Whittenton Mills. In 1698, Leonard's sons established another works in Chartley, in what is now Norton, Massachusetts. Job M. Leonard, another descendant of James, would later set up iron works in nearby East Bridgewater and Somerset.

Today, a small park occupies the site of the original 1853 Taunton Iron Works. The site was dedicated in 1950 by descendants of Theodore Dean, the last owner of the works. An anchor donated by the United States Navy marks the spot once occupied by the forge. The Two Mile River is now known as the Forge River.

== See also ==
- Bridgewater Iron Works
- Old Colony Iron Works
- Thomas Baylies
