= John Winthrop Jr. Iron Furnace Site =

- U.S. National Register of Historic Places
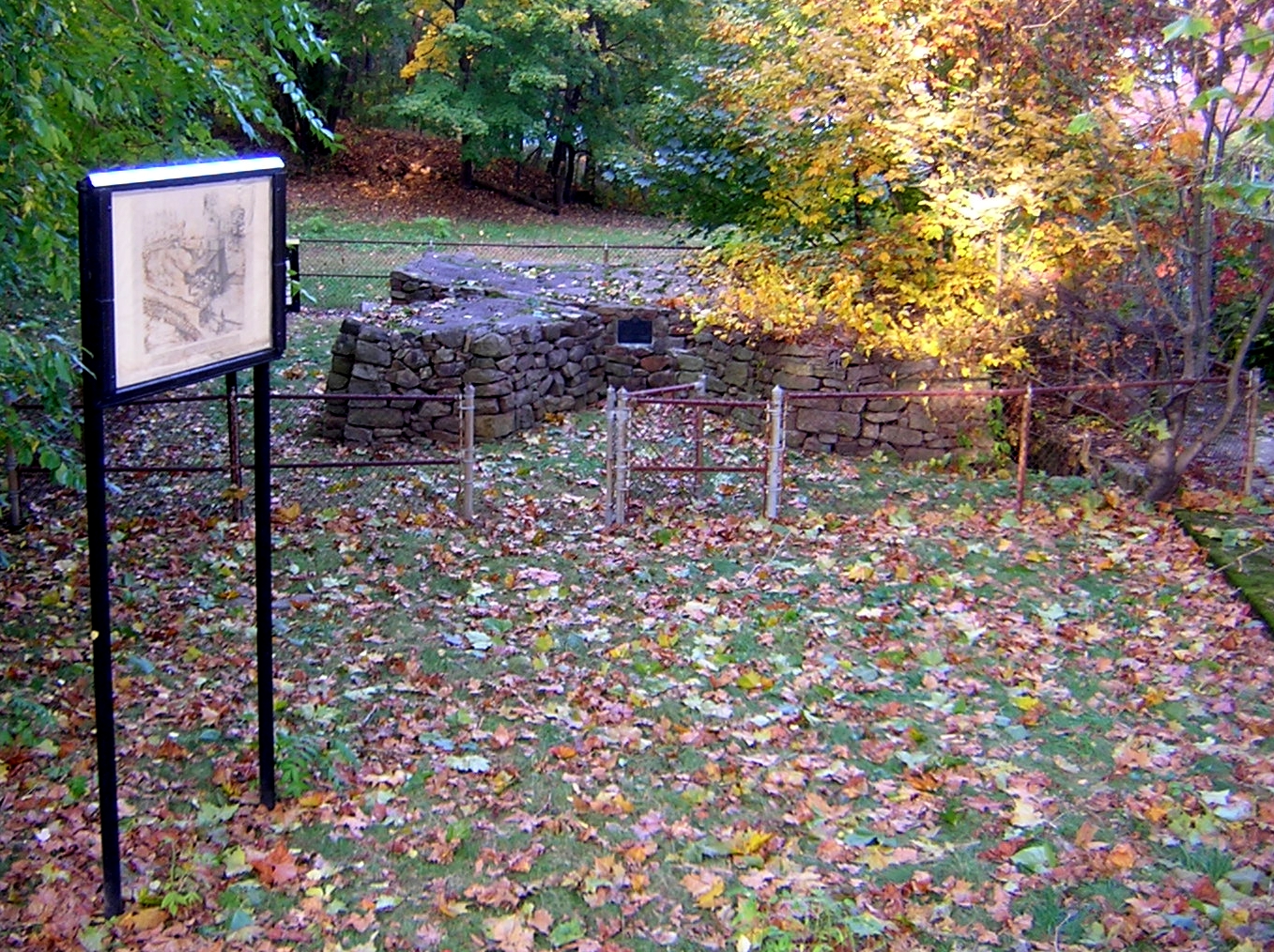

- Location within Massachusetts Location within the United States
- Nearest city: Quincy, Massachusetts
- Coordinates: 42°14′44.8″N 71°1′37.5″W
- Area: less than one acre
- Built: 1644
- NRHP reference No.: 77000192
- Added to NRHP: September 20, 1977

The John Winthrop Jr. Iron Furnace Site is a historic archaeological site at 61 Crescent Street, Quincy, Massachusetts. The site is called Braintree Furnace in some texts; the West Quincy location at the time of operation was in a part of Braintree, Massachusetts, that later became Quincy. Its importance lies in the fact that it was the first iron blast furnace established in what would become the United States. Furnace Brook, a stream which begins on the eastern slopes of the Blue Hills and meanders for about four miles from southwest to northeast through the middle of Quincy toward Quincy Bay, was named for the works site.

The site was added to the National Register of Historic Places in 1977.

== History ==
During the 17th century, iron was used to manufacture a number of indispensable goods, including nails, horseshoes, cookware, tools, and weapons. The production of iron required a complex manufacturing process, which was not available during the early years of the North American colonization. Thus, all of the colonists iron goods had to be imported. As it took at least two months to sail to the nearest foundry, iron goods were very expensive.

John Winthrop the Younger wanted to establish an iron works in the Massachusetts Bay Colony. He believed that because the colonies had a cheap and abundant supply of raw materials, an iron works in Massachusetts could produce goods that could be sold profitably in the New England and Chesapeake Colonies as well as in England. In 1639, Winthrop sailed to England to get the capital he needed to fund the project. The Company of Undertakers for the Iron Workes [sic] in New England was founded to finance the venture. Winthrop selected Braintree as the location of the first iron furnace. Construction began in 1644 and was completed in 1645. On October 15, 1645, Winthrop secured the Undertakers an exemption from taxes and a 21-year monopoly on iron production from the Massachusetts General Court.

The Braintree iron furnace, however, was unsuccessful due to a lack of iron ore in the area and an inadequate supply of water to power the machinery. The furnace shut down in 1647, not long after the Saugus Iron Works was completed.

Several workers from the Braintree Furnace would go on to establish iron works in other locations. In the 1650s, James Leonard would help establish the Taunton Iron Works on the Two Mile River in Taunton, Massachusetts. His brother Henry Leonard would return to Saugus for a while before establishing a new works at Rowley in 1668. He would later move to New Jersey with his sons where several other works were built. Ralph Russell, another ironmaster from Braintree moved to Dartmouth where he set up a forge at what became known as Russells Mills, on the Paskamanset River.

== Images ==
Images of John Winthrop Jr. Iron Furnace Site

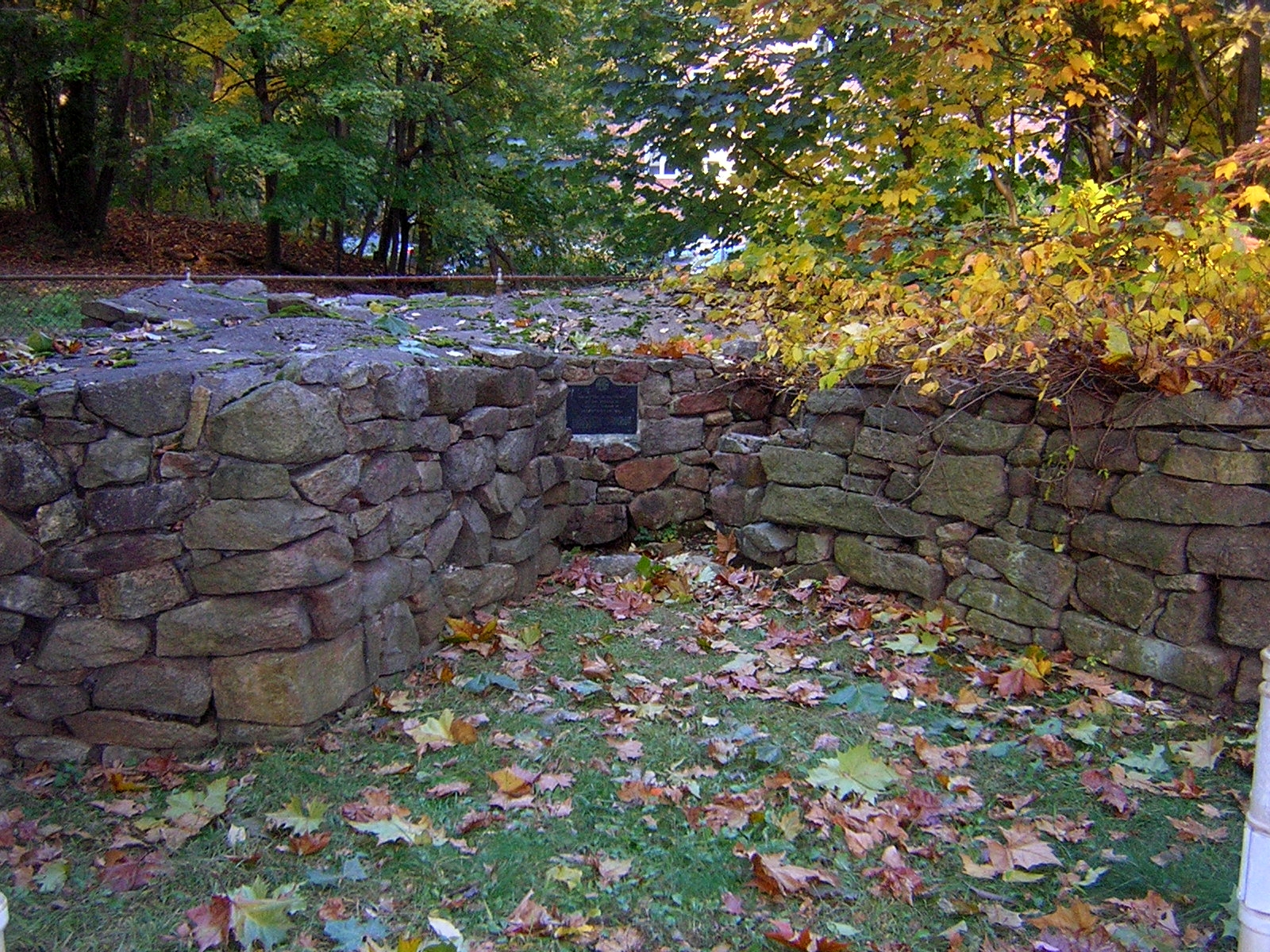

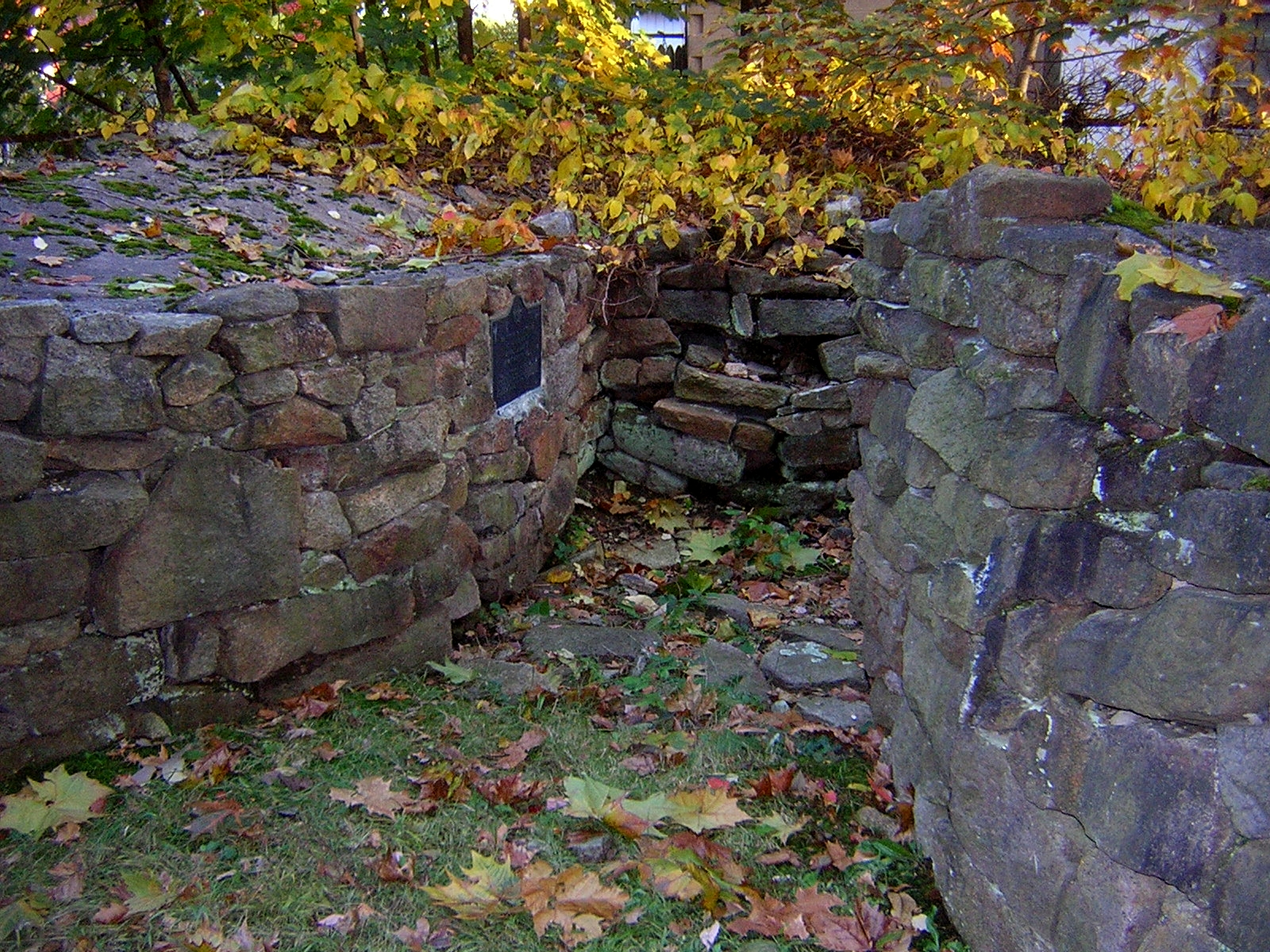

== See also ==
- National Register of Historic Places listings in Quincy, Massachusetts
