= Joseph Bradley Varnum =

American politician (1751–1821)

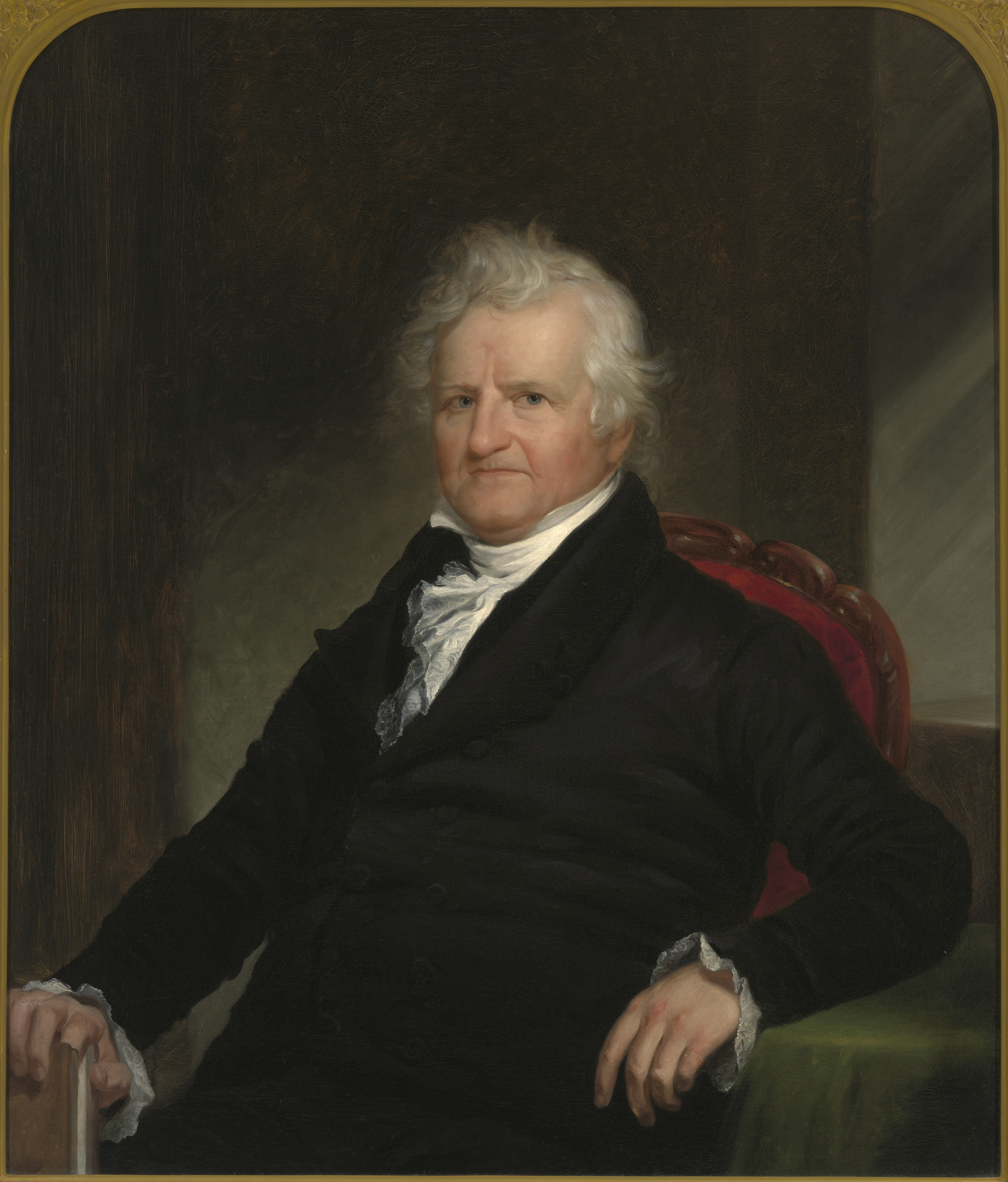
- Posthumous portrait by Charles Loring Elliott, after Ezra Ames, c. 1858

President pro tempore of the United States Senate
- In office December 6, 1813 – February 3, 1814
- Preceded by: William H. Crawford
- Succeeded by: John Gaillard

6th Speaker of the United States House of Representatives
- In office October 26, 1807 – March 3, 1811
- Preceded by: Nathaniel Macon
- Succeeded by: Henry Clay

United States Senator from Massachusetts
- In office June 29, 1811 – March 3, 1817
- Preceded by: Timothy Pickering
- Succeeded by: Harrison Gray Otis

Member of the U.S. House of Representatives from Massachusetts
- In office March 4, 1795 – June 29, 1811
- Preceded by: Constituency established
- Succeeded by: William M. Richardson
- Constituency: 9th district (1795–1803); 4th district (1803–11)

Member of the Massachusetts Senate
- In office 1789–1795

Personal details
- Born: January 29, 1750/1751 Dracut, Province of Massachusetts Bay, British America
- Died: September 21, 1821 (aged 70–71) Dracut, Massachusetts, U.S.
- Resting place: Varnum Cemetery, Dracut
- Party: Democratic-Republican
- Children: 12

Military service
- Branch/service: Massachusetts Militia
- Battles/wars: American Revolutionary War

Joseph Bradley Varnum (January 29, 1750/1751 – September 21, 1821) was an American politician from Massachusetts. He served as a U.S. representative and United States senator, and held leadership positions in both bodies. He was a member of the Democratic-Republican Party.

Born in Dracut in the Province of Massachusetts Bay, Varnum was the son of farmer, militia officer and local official Samuel Varnum and Mary Prime. He received a limited formal education, but became a self-taught scholar. Varnum became a farmer, and at age 18 received his commission as a captain in the Massachusetts militia. He commanded Dracut's militia company during the American Revolution and remained in the militia afterwards, eventually attaining the rank of major general in 1805.

Varnum took part in the government of Massachusetts following independence, including as a member of the Massachusetts House of Representatives from 1780 to 1785 and a member of the Massachusetts State Senate from 1786 to 1795. Despite not being an attorney, Varnum also served as a judge, including terms as a Justice of the Massachusetts Court of Common Pleas and Chief Justice of the Massachusetts Court of General Sessions. He was a member of the U.S. House from 1795 to 1811, and was Speaker of the House from 1807 to 1811. Varnum served in the U.S. Senate from 1811 to 1817, and was the Senate's president pro tempore from 1813 to 1814.

After leaving the U.S. Senate, Varnum served in the Massachusetts State Senate until his death. He died in Dracut on September 21, 1821, and was buried at Varnum Cemetery in Dracut.

== Biography ==
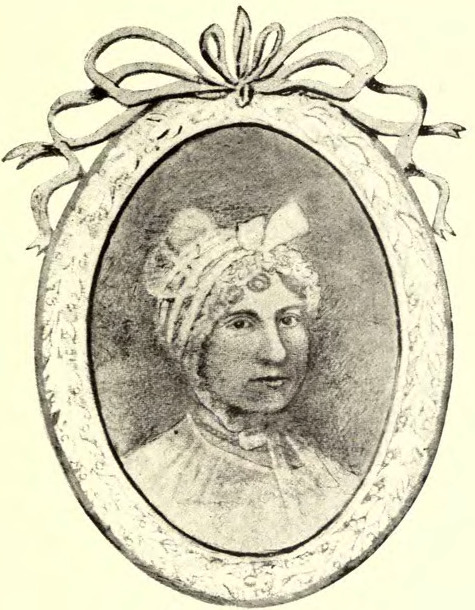
Varnum's wife, Molly Butler Varnum

Joseph Bradley Varnum was born in Dracut, Massachusetts, in Middlesex County, on January 29, 1750, or 1751.

At the age of eighteen, he was commissioned as a captain by the committee of Massachusetts Bay Colony, and in 1787 colonel by the Commonwealth of Massachusetts. He was made brigadier general in 1802, and in 1805 major general of the state militia, holding the latter office at his death in 1821.

After serving in the Massachusetts militia during the American Revolutionary War, Varnum helped to destroy the Shays insurrection before he was elected to the Massachusetts House of Representatives (1780–1785) and then the Massachusetts State Senate (1786–1795). He also served as a Justice of the Massachusetts Court of Common Pleas and as Chief Justice of the Massachusetts Court of General Sessions. Before his election to Congress in 1794, he had run unsuccessfully twice — in 1788 to represent the 3rd congressional district, and in 1792 to represent the Middlesex County seat in the 1st congressional district.

In 1794, Varnum was elected to the U.S. House of Representatives, where he served from March 4, 1795, until his resignation on June 29, 1811. He was one of six Democratic-Republican representatives to oppose the Twelfth Amendment to the United States Constitution. During his last four years in the House, he served as its Speaker.

Varnum was elected to the U.S. Senate in 1811 to fill the vacancy in the term. He became the only U.S. Senator from the Democratic-Republican Party in Massachusetts history.

Varnum served as President pro tempore of the U.S. Senate from December 6, 1813, to February 3, 1814, during the Thirteenth Congress. He was also the Chair of the Senate Committee on Militia during the Fourteenth Congress.

After returning to Massachusetts in 1817, Varnum again served in the Massachusetts State Senate, until his death on September 21, 1821.

Varnum died in Dracut, and is interred in Varnum Cemetery in that town. His brother was Major General James Mitchell Varnum who commanded the 1st Rhode Island Regiment from 1775 to 1777, served as a brigade commander at the Battle of Rhode Island and later served as the major general in command of the Rhode Island Militia.

== Slavery ==
Henry Wilson, in his History of Slavery, quotes Varnum in the debate on the bill for the government of the Mississippi Territory before the United States House of Representatives in March 1798 as having been very strong and outspoken in his opposition to Negro servitude. Varnum developed a strong friendship with Silas Royal, a former slave freed by the Varnum family, who also served with him during the war.

On March 3, 1805, Varnum submitted a Massachusetts Proposition to amend the Constitution (Note: In the 1786 US Constitution there was a provision in Article I – the part of the document dealing with the duties of the legislative branch: Section 9. The migration or importation of such persons as any of the states now existing shall think proper to admit, shall not be prohibited by the Congress prior to the year one thousand eight hundred and eight, but a tax or duty may be imposed on such importation, not exceeding ten dollars for each person. In other words, the government could not ban the importation of slaves for 20 years after the adoption of the Constitution. And as the designated year 1808 approached, those opposed to slavery began making plans for legislation that would outlaw the trans-Atlantic slave trade.) and Abolish the Slave Trade. This proposition was tabled until 1807, when under Varnum's leadership the amendment moved through Congress and passed both houses on March 2, 1807. President Thomas Jefferson signed it into law on March 3, 1807. (Note: Journal of the House of Representatives of the United States 1804–1807 March 3, 1805 Congressman Joseph Bradley Varnum, one of the members for the State of Massachusetts, presented to the House a letter from the Governor of the said State, enclosing an attested copy of two concurrent resolutions of the Senate and House of Representatives of the State of Massachusetts, passed the fifteenth of February, in the present year, "instructing the Senators, and requesting the Representatives in Congress, from the said State, to take all legal and necessary steps, to use their utmost exertions, as soon as the same is practicable, to obtain an amendment to the Federal Constitution, so as to authorize and empower the Congress of the United States to pass a law, whenever they may deem it expedient, to prevent the further importation of slaves from any of the West India Islands, from the coast of Africa, or elsewhere, into the United States, or any part thereof:" Whereupon, A motion was made and seconded that the House do come to the following resolution: Resolved by the Senate and House of Representatives of the United States of America in Congress assembled, two-thirds of both Houses concurring, That the following article be proposed to the Legislatures of the several States, as an amendment to the Constitution of the United States, which, when ratified by three-fourths of the said Legislatures, shall be valid to all intents and purposes, as a part of the said Constitution, to wit: "That the Congress of the United States shall have power to prevent the further importation of slaves into the United States and the Territories thereof." The said proposed resolution was read, and ordered to lie on the table.)

== Notes ==
Party political offices
Preceded by Elbridge Gerry	Democratic-Republican nominee for Governor of Massachusetts; 1813	Succeeded by Lemuel Dexter
U.S. House of Representatives
Preceded by First; New constituency	Member of the U.S. House of Representatives from Massachusetts's 9th congressional district March 4, 1795 – March 3, 1803	Succeeded by Phanuel Bishop
Preceded by Seth Hastings	Member of the U.S. House of Representatives from Massachusetts's 4th congressional district March 4, 1803 – June 29, 1811	Succeeded by William M. Richardson
Preceded by Nathaniel Macon	Speaker of the United States House of Representatives; October 26, 1807 – March 4, 1809; May 22, 1809 – March 3, 1811	Succeeded by Henry Clay
U.S. Senate
Preceded by Timothy Pickering	U.S. senator (Class 2) from Massachusetts; June 29, 1811 – March 3, 1817; Served alongside: James Lloyd, Christopher Gore, Eli P. Ashmun	Succeeded by Harrison Gray Otis
Preceded by William H. Crawford	President pro tempore of the United States Senate; December 6, 1813 – February 3, 1814	Succeeded by John Gaillard
