= William Flora =

- Born: Unknown; Portsmouth, Virginia Colony, British North America, British Empire, present-day Portsmouth, Virginia
- Died: 1820; Portsmouth, VA
- Other name: Billy Flora
- Occupations: freight company owner, livery stable owner, land speculator, soldier
- Military career
- Allegiance: Virginia, United States
- Branch: Virginia State Forces (1775-1776) Colonel William Woodford's 2nd Virginia Regiment Continental Army (1776-1781) Captain William Grymes's company 15th Virginia Regiment, Virginia Line Consolidated into 11th Virginia Regiment; Virginia Line Consolidated into 5th Virginia Regiment; Virginia Line United States Marine Corps (1807)
- Service years: 1775–1781, 1807
- Rank: Private
- Conflicts: American Revolutionary War: Battle of Great Bridge (1775); Battle of Brandywine (1777); Battle of Germantown (1777); Battle of Monmouth (1778); Siege of Charleston (1780); Battle of Yorktown (1781)

William Flora (fl. 1775–1820) was a free-born African American from Virginia who served as a soldier on the Patriot side in the American Revolutionary War. He fought under Colonel William Woodford in the Battle of Great Bridge in December 1775, where he is widely acknowledged as the hero of the battle. A sentry at the bridge reported he was the last to cross as the British advanced. As he retreated from his post, under heavy fire from the British line, he ripped up a plank from the bridge. This made the British crossing, under fire from the colonials, impossible. As a result, the British were forced to withdraw to their ships. The only casualty on the American side survived to speak very highly of Flora and his courage.

Before the war Flora owned a prosperous livery stable. After the war, with the purchase and sale of property, he grew his business into a tidy fortune.

== Early life ==
William Flora was born, date unknown, in Portsmouth, Virginia Colony, of British North America, in the British Empire, to a free-born, African American family.

== American Revolutionary War ==
During the American Revolutionary War, William Flora fought under Colonel William Woodford in the Virginia State Forces at the Battle of Great Bridge in December 1775, where he is widely acknowledged as the Patriot hero of the battle. Flora provided his own musket, which points to the likelihood that he had already garnered the respect of his white neighbors as free blacks were not able to bear arms or enlist in the military at the time. At the Battle of Great Bridge, a sentry at the bridge reported he was the last to cross, as the British advanced. As Flora retreated from his post under heavy fire from the British line, he ripped up a plank from the bridge. This made the British crossing under fire from the Patriots impossible. As a result, the British were forced to withdraw to their ships. The only casualty, a soldier with a wounded thumb, on the American side survived, to speak very highly of William Flora and his courage. His acts of courage earned him public commendation in the Virginia Gazette.

According to Continental Army muster and pay rolls, William Flora, in November 1776, served under "Captain William Grymes's company of the 15th Virginia Regiment", which participated in the 1777 Battles of Brandywine and Germantown and the 1778 Battle of Monmouth. While with his fellow soldiers in South Carolina, Flora avoided being captured by the British, in the 1780 Siege of Charleston where the majority of the regiment was captured. During the war, because the unit kept getting smaller, it was consolidated into the 11th Virginia Regiment and finally into the 5th Virginia Regiment, until the end of the war. Flora also fought in the Battle of Yorktown in 1781.

== Postwar years ==
After the war, Flora became a successful businessman as a freight company owner, land speculator, and livery stable owner. Thirty years after his military service in the American Revolutionary War, he was honored with a 100-acre land warrant in what is now Southwestern Ohio. Flora was one of the first African-Americans to own land in Virginia. In 1807, after HMS Leopard attacked the USS Chesapeake, Flora enlisted in the military again. This event was a major precursor to the War of 1812. Even though his second stint in the military was short, he served on a gunboat as a marine under Commodore Stephen Decatur. Flora was honorably discharged again from the military and lived the rest of his years in peace until his death in Portsmouth in 1820. He accumulated his earnings into a tidy fortune that was passed down to his son and eventually grandson.
