= Jeffrey Brace =

Former slave and writer

- Born: Boyrereau Brinch c. 1742; Middle Niger, West Africa
- Died: April 20, 1827 (aged 84–85); Georgia, Vermont, US
- Occupations: Enslaved sailor, soldier, farmer, author
- Spouse: Susannah Dublin (Susanna)
- Military career
- Allegiance: Great Britain; United States
- Branch: Royal Navy (1756-1763); Continental Army (1775–1781)
- Commands: Connecticut Line
- Conflicts: French and Indian War; Siege of Havana; American Revolutionary War; Battle of White Plains; Siege of Fort Mifflin (WIA)

Jeffrey Brace (born Boyrereau Brinch; c. 1742 – April 20, 1827) was a formerly enslaved person who was taken from West Africa around 1750 and a veteran of the American Revolutionary War. He became the first African-American citizen of Poultney, Vermont. Brace became blind in his later years. Benjamin Prentiss published his life story as The Blind African Slave or the Memoirs of Boyrereau Brinch Nicknamed Jeffrey Brace.

== Biography ==
Brace was born in West Africa circa 1742 with the birth name Boyrereau Brinch. In his memoir, Brace describes growing up in the Christian kingdom of "Bow-Woo" before being kidnapped by slave traders at a young age and taken to the Caribbean. Scholars believe this region may correspond to present-day Mali, based on geographical and cultural details in his memoir.

Brinch described himself as the “third son and seventh child of an ancient and honorable family.” His father, Whryn Brinch, and mother, Whryn Douden, came from distinguished lineages. His paternal grandfather, Yarram Brinch, served as a councilor and governor in the country of "Bow-Woo", while his maternal grandfather, Crassee Youghgon, was the first judge of petty offenses and civil disputes in Voah Goah. Brinch’s siblings included Cresse, Deeyee, Yarram, Desang, Bang, Nabaugh, and Dolacella.

As an enslaved sailor, he served in the privateer ship of Captain Isaac Mills, his enslaver, during the French and Indian War. Afterward, he was brought to New England, where he was eventually bought by the Stiles family of Woodbury, Connecticut. Unlike previous enslavers, Mary Stiles taught him to read, and significantly shaped his early life in America. Upon her death around 1773, ownership of Brinch passed to her eldest son, Benjamin Stiles, Esq.

Jeffrey served under Return Meigs during the American Revolutionary War. He fought in battles such as White Plains, and Fort Mifflin. His military service earned him an Honorable Discharge with a Badge of Merit at West Point Military Academy in 1783. Despite some accounts suggesting he was freed by Benjamin Stiles, no definitive evidence of manumission exists; it is more likely that his service secured his liberty.

After the war, he obtained his freedom from the Stiles family and settled in Poultney, Vermont. In Vermont, he met and married a free African-born widow, Susannah Dublin, and had children with her. Jeffrey Brace died on January 31, 1827, in Georgia, Vermont. His descendants live in St. Albans, Vermont, and the surrounding areas.

== Legacy ==
Brace gave an oral account of his life to an abolitionist publisher, Benjamin Prentiss, who transcribed and published it as The Blind African Slave or the Memoirs of Boyrereau Brinch Nicknamed Jeffrey Brace. The Blind African Slave is part of the slave narrative genre.

The faculty union at the University of Vermont now offers a $500 book award in his name "to students who exemplify academic excellence and an active commitment to achieving social and economic justice."

A historical marker honoring Brace was erected in 2008 in Poultney.
