= Georgia Plains, Vermont =

- Unincorporated community
- Location within Vermont Location within the United States
- Coordinates: 44°43′16″N 73°09′50″W
- Country: United States
- State: Vermont
- County: Franklin
- Elevation: 262 ft (80 m)
- Time zone: UTC-5 (Eastern (EST))
  - Summer (DST): UTC-4 (EDT)
- ZIP Code: 05468 (Milton)
- Area code: 802
- GNIS feature ID: 1457534

Georgia Plains (also Georgia Plain) is an unincorporated community in Franklin County, Vermont, United States.
