= Patriot (American Revolution) =

American revolutionaries

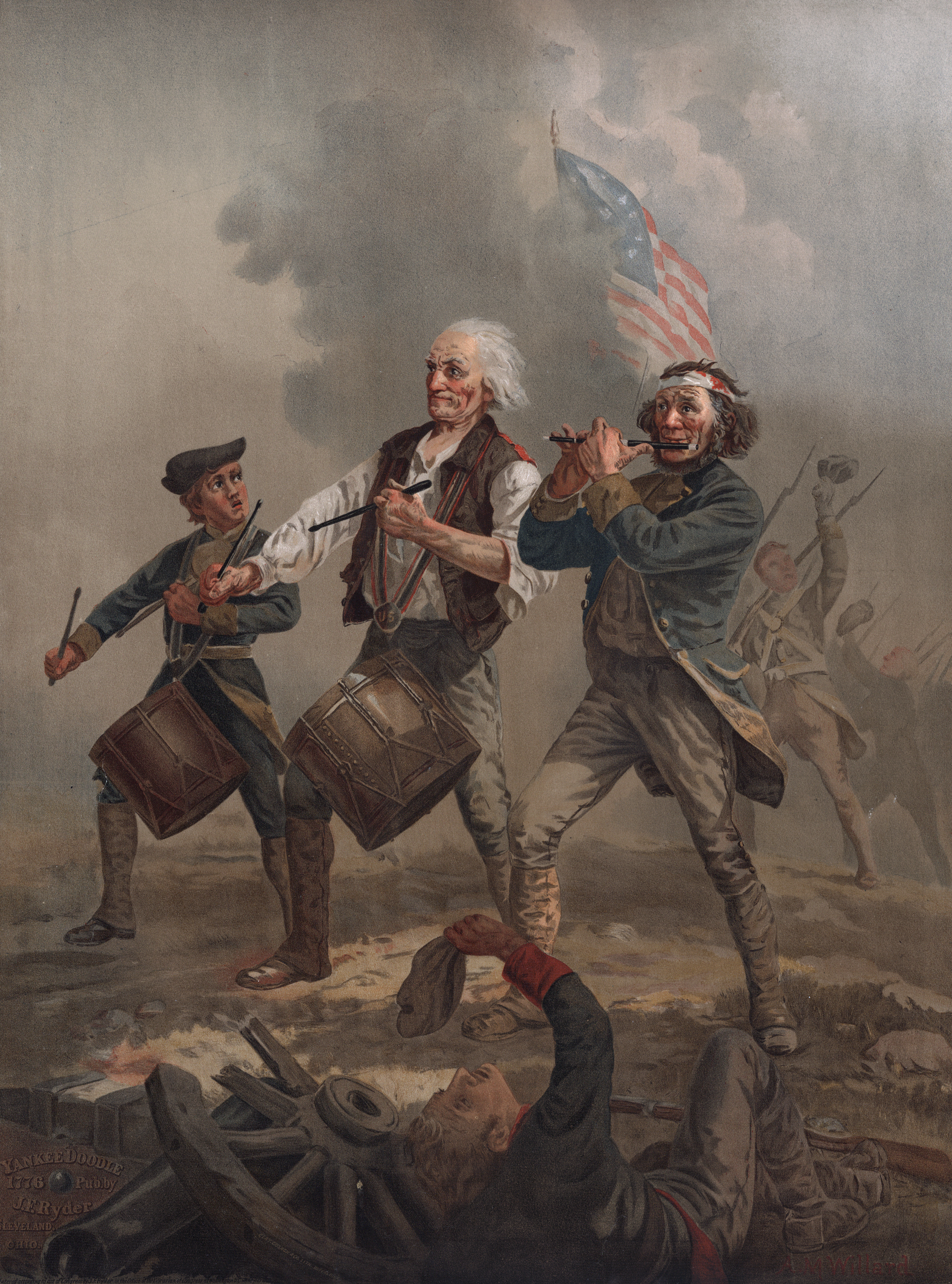
A group of patriots during the American Revolutionary War, depicted in the 1875 portrait The Spirit of '76 by Archibald Willard

Patriots (also known as Revolutionaries, Continentals, Rebels, or Whigs) were colonists in the Thirteen Colonies who opposed the Kingdom of Great Britain's control and governance during the colonial era and supported and helped launch the American Revolution that ultimately established American independence. Patriot politicians led colonial opposition to British policies regarding the American colonies, eventually building support for the adoption of the Declaration of Independence, which was adopted unanimously by the Second Continental Congress on July 4, 1776.

After the American Revolutionary War began in 1775, many patriots assimilated into the Continental Army, which was commanded by George Washington and which ultimately secured victory against the British Army, leading the British to end their involvement in the war and acknowledge the sovereign independence of the colonies, reflected in the Treaty of Paris, which led to the establishment of the United States in 1783.

The patriots were inspired by English and American republican ideology that was part of the Age of Enlightenment, and rejected monarchy and aristocracy and supported individual liberty and natural rights and legal rights. Prominent patriot political theorists, including Thomas Jefferson, John Adams, and Thomas Paine, spearheaded the American Enlightenment, which was in turn inspired by European thinkers such as Francis Bacon, John Locke, and Jean-Jacques Rousseau. Though slavery existed in all of the Thirteen Colonies prior to the American Revolution, the issue divided patriots, with some supporting its abolition while others espoused proslavery thought.

The patriots included members of every social and ethnic group in the colonies, though support for the patriot cause was strongest in the New England Colonies and weakest in the Southern Colonies. The American Revolution divided the colonial population into three groups: patriots, who supported the end of British rule; loyalists, who supported Britain's continued control over the colonies; and those who remained neutral. African Americans who supported the patriots were known as Black Patriots, with their counterparts on the British side being referred to as Black Loyalists.

== Terminology ==
The critics of British policy towards the Thirteen Colonies called themselves "Whigs" after 1768, identifying with members of the British Whig party who favored similar colonial policies. Samuel Johnson writes that, at the time, the word "patriot" had a negative connotation and was used as a negative epithet for "a factious disturber of the government".

Prior to the American Revolution, colonists who supported British authority called themselves Tories or royalists, identifying with the political philosophy of traditionalist conservatism as it existed in Great Britain. During the American Revolution, these persons became known primarily as Loyalists. Afterward, some 15% of Loyalists emigrated north to the remaining British territories in the Canadas. There, they called themselves the United Empire Loyalists, while 85% of the Loyalists decided to stay in the new United States and were granted American citizenship.

== Composition ==
Prior to the formal beginning of the American Revolution, many patriots were active in groups including the Sons of Liberty. The most prominent patriot leaders are referred to today as the Founding Fathers, who are generally defined as the 56 men who, as delegates to the Second Continental Congress in Philadelphia, signed the Declaration of Independence.

Patriots included a cross-section of the population of the Thirteen Colonies and came from varying backgrounds. Roughly 40 to 45 percent of the white population in the Thirteen Colonies supported the patriots' cause, between 15 and 20 percent supported the Loyalists, and the remainder were neutral or kept a low profile regarding their loyalties. The great majority of Loyalists remained in the Thirteen Colonies during the American Revolution; a minority, however, fled the nation for Canada, Great Britain, Florida, or the West Indies.

== Motivations ==
Historians have explored the motivations that pulled men to one side or the other. Yale historian Leonard Woods Labaree used the published and unpublished writings and letters of leading men on each side, searching for how personality shaped their choice. He finds eight characteristics that differentiated the two groups. Loyalists were older, better established, and more likely to resist innovation than the patriots. Loyalists felt that the Crown was the legitimate government and resistance to it was morally wrong, while the patriots felt that morality was on their side because the British government had violated the constitutional rights of Englishmen. Men who were alienated by physical attacks on Royal officials took the Loyalist position, while those who were offended by British responses to actions such as the Boston Tea Party became patriots. Merchants in the port cities with long-standing financial attachments to Britain were likely to remain loyal, while few patriots were so deeply enmeshed in the system. Some Loyalists, according to Labaree, were "procrastinators" who believed that independence was bound to come some day but wanted to "postpone the moment", while the patriots wanted to "seize the moment". Loyalists were cautious and afraid of anarchy or tyranny that might come from mob rule; patriots made a systematic effort to take a stand against the British government. Finally, Labaree argues that Loyalists were pessimists who lacked the patriots' confidence that independence lay ahead.

The patriots rejected taxes imposed by legislatures in which the taxpayer was not represented. "No taxation without representation" was their slogan, referring to the lack of representation in the British Parliament. The British countered that there was "virtual representation" in the sense that all members of Parliament represented the interests of all the citizens of the British Empire. Some patriots declared that they were loyal to the king, but they insisted that they should be free to run their own affairs. In fact, they had been running their own affairs since the period of "salutary neglect" before the French and Indian War. Some radical patriots tarred and feathered tax collectors and customs officers, making those positions dangerous; according to Benjamin Irvin, the practice was especially prevalent in Boston where many patriots lived.

== See also ==
- List of Patriots (American Revolution)

== Bibliography ==
- Ellis, Joseph. Founding Brothers: The Revolutionary Generation (2002; Pulitzer Prize)
- Kann, Mark E. The Gendering of American Politics: Founding Mothers, Founding Fathers, and Political Patriarchy (1999) online version
- Middlekauff, Robert. The Glorious Cause: The American Revolution, 1763–1789 (2005) online version
- Miller, John C. Origins of the American Revolution (1943) online version
- Miller, John C. Triumph of Freedom, 1775–1783 (1948) online version
- Previdi, Robert. "Vindicating the Founders: Race, Sex, Class, and Justice in the Origins of America", Presidential Studies Quarterly, Vol. 29, 1999
- Rakove, Jack. Revolutionaries: A New History of the Invention of America (2010) excerpt and text search
- Raphael, Ray. A People's History of the American Revolution: How Common People Shaped the Fight for Independence (2002)
- Roberts, Cokie. Founding Mothers: The Women Who Raised Our Nation (2005)
