= Great Episodes =

Great Episodes is a series of historical novels written by Ann Rinaldi. They combine fictional and non-fictional characters to describe events in history.

== Series ==
- A Ride into Morning (1991), ISBN 0-15-200573-0
- A Break with Charity (1992), ISBN 0-15-200353-3
- The Fifth of March (1993), ISBN 0-15-200343-6
- Finishing Becca (1994), ISBN 0-15-200880-2
- The Secret of Sarah Revere (1995), ISBN 0-15-200393-2
- Keep Smiling Through (1996), ISBN 0-15-200768-7
- Hang a Thousand Trees with Ribbons (1996), ISBN 0-15-200876-4
- An Acquaintance with Darkness (1997), ISBN 0-15-201294-X
- Cast Two Shadows (1998), ISBN 0-15-200881-0
- The Coffin Quilt (1999), ISBN 0-15-202015-2
- The Staircase (2000), ISBN 0-15-202430-1
- Or Give Me Death (2003), ISBN 0-15-216687-4
- An Unlikely Friendship (2007), ISBN 0-15-205597-5
- Come Juneteenth (2007), ISBN 0-15-205947-4
- The Ever-After Bird (2007), ISBN 0-15-202620-7
- Juliet's Moon (2008), ISBN 0-15-206170-3
- The Letter Writer (2008)
