= Pennsylvania Line Mutiny =

Mutiny of Continental Army soldiers

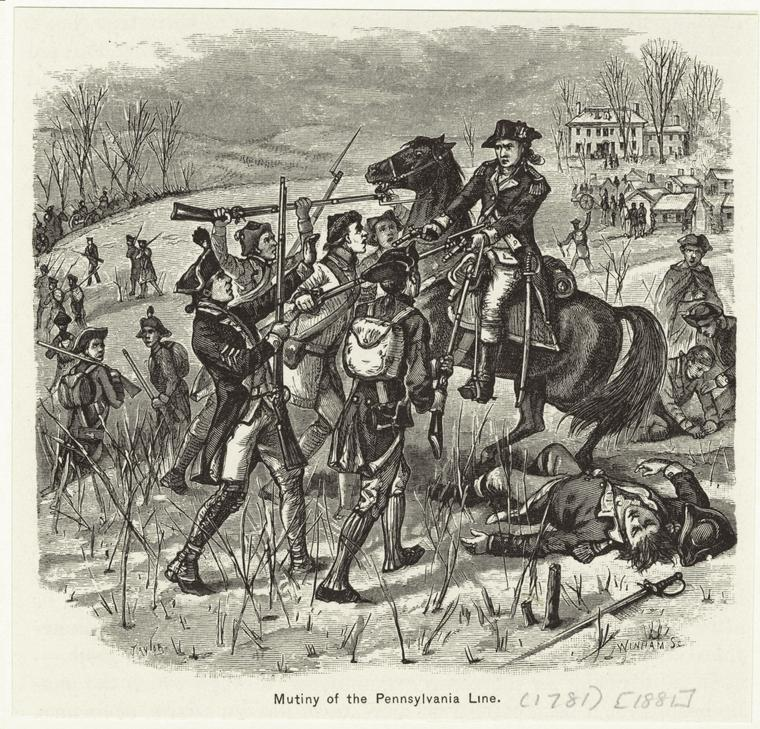
Mutiny of the Pennsylvania Line

The Pennsylvania Line Mutiny was a mutiny of Continental Army soldiers, who demanded higher pay and better housing conditions, and was the cause of the legend and stories surrounding the American heroine Tempe Wick. The mutiny began on January 1, 1781, and ended with a negotiated settlement on January 8, 1781. The negotiated terms were finally concluded by January 29, 1781. The mutiny was the most successful and important insurrection of Continental Army soldiers during the American Revolutionary War.

During the winter, some of the mutinying soldiers also gathered food, supplies, and especially horses with the intention of traveling south to Philadelphia to march on Congress, which was then preparing to consider and ratify the Articles of Confederation, and to make their demands to Congress in person. However, there is no evidence that suggests that the soldiers intended to do physical harm or violence to any Congressman. When the mutiny broke out at Jockey Hollow, the Wick family estate, the soldiers famously tried to stop Tempe Wick, who was riding home to her sick mother on her horse Colonel. When the soldiers demanded that she surrender her horse, Tempe refused. When they again ordered her to dismount, she tricked the soldiers, and rode back to the Wick House, where she hid the horse.

Although the mutineers were upset with Congress and with their officers, they ultimately refused to defect to the British when British Army General Sir Henry Clinton made them an offer. The mutiny lasted until the end of January when the Supreme Executive Council of the Commonwealth of Pennsylvania opened negotiations with the leaders of the mutiny. When the negotiations proved satisfactory, many of the soldiers returned to fight for the Continental Army, and participated in future campaigns. This mutiny inspired a similar insurrection by the New Jersey Line known as the Pompton Mutiny, but this time the outcome was not as favorable to the soldiers, and the officers reestablished order over the army after they executed several New Jersey soldiers for treason.

== Background ==
During the winter of 1780–1781, the Continental Army was dispersed into smaller components to ease the strain of supply. The Pennsylvania Line, comprising about 2,400 men, was encamped at Jockey Hollow, New Jersey, near Morristown. Conditions for the army were deplorable, as reported in letters by both General George Washington, commander of the entire Continental Army, and General Anthony Wayne, commander of the Pennsylvania Line. In previous years, both Washington and Wayne had cited corruption and a lack of concern on the part of state governments and the Continental Congress in fostering the poor conditions.

Pennsylvania troops had particular cause for discontent, as Pennsylvania was one of the stingiest states in paying its soldiers — many of the Pennsylvania Line had served for three years in exchange for only their initial $20 bounty. Other states' troops were receiving enlistment bounties valued in hundreds of dollars (New Jersey recruits received a $1,000 bounty), and even new Pennsylvania recruits received large bounties while serving soldiers neither received regular pay nor reenlistment money.

By January 1, 1781, the soldiers' dissatisfaction reached a boiling point. Many "three year men" reckoned that their enlistment terms, "for three years or the duration of the war", had ended with the coming of the new year. However, desperate to maintain the army's manpower, the Line's officers reckoned the enlistment terms to mean that soldiers were bound to serve for the duration of the war if it lasted more than three years. The Pennsylvania government would later admit that the widely accepted reckoning used by the soldiers was the correct one.

== Mutiny ==
On January 1, 1781, the Pennsylvania Line held a raucous New Year's Day celebration. That evening, soldiers from several regiments armed themselves and prepared to depart the camp without permission. Officers led the remaining orderly regiments to quell the uprising, but after a few warning shots from the mutineers, the rest of the regiments fell into line with them. Captain Adam Bitting, commander of Company D, 4th Pennsylvania Regiment, was fatally shot by a mutineer who was trying to kill a lieutenant colonel. Otherwise, the uprising was relatively bloodless.

General Wayne tried to convince the soldiers to return to order peacefully, but while the soldiers promised not to defect to the British, they would not be satisfied until Pennsylvania redressed their grievances. Wayne followed his troops and dispatched letters to Washington and the Pennsylvania government. The Line set up a temporary headquarters in the town of Princeton, New Jersey and selected a Board of Sergeants to speak for them, headed by Sergeant William Bouzar, who had previously served in the British Army.

== Continental and British negotiations ==
On January 5, the Supreme Executive Council of the Commonwealth of Pennsylvania learned of the mutiny and immediately dispatched Joseph Reed, the council's president, to resolve it. That same day, George Washington issued a circular letter to the Continental Congress and the governments of New Hampshire, Massachusetts, Rhode Island, and Connecticut, begging once again for material aid for the army, citing the soldiers' deplorable conditions that lead to the mutiny of the Pennsylvania Line.

Reed spent the night of January 6 in Trenton where he met with delegates from the Continental Congress. Knowing the mutineers would have public sympathy on their side (including the Pennsylvania militia), the government had no choice but to negotiate. On January 7, Reed arrived in Princeton to meet the Board of Sergeants. Although General Anthony Wayne initially feared his men might not welcome Reed, on the contrary, Wayne and Reed were forced to dissuade the soldiers from honoring them with a cannon salute out of fear that it might alarm the locals.

Also on January 7 John Mason, an emissary from General Sir Henry Clinton, British commander in New York City, arrived in Princeton. He was accompanied by James Ogden, a guide he had acquired in New Jersey. The agent brought a letter from Clinton offering the Pennsylvanians their back pay from British coffers if they gave up the rebel cause. Clinton had misjudged the nature of the Pennsylvanians' mutiny — the sentries seized both the agent and his guide. Although the mutineers refused to turn Clinton's emissaries over immediately to Wayne and Reed, they showed good faith by informing them of the British offer and their refusal to accept it.

Negotiations went quickly, as the soldiers distilled their grievances to one issue: that men enlisted in 1776 and 1777 for $20 bounties be discharged and then given the opportunity to reenlist for a new bounty if they wished. Reed heard testimony to the effect that officers had coerced soldiers to stay in the army or reenlist with unfavorable terms, even employing corporal punishment to that end. He found the testimony compelling and agreed to their terms, even allowing that the many soldiers whose enlistment papers were unavailable could simply swear an oath that they were "twenty dollar men" and be discharged.

== Aftermath ==
Reed made arrangements in Trenton, where the Pennsylvanians marched to begin the discharge process on January 12. Approximately 1,250 infantrymen and 67 artillerymen were discharged. When the proceedings ended on January 29, only 1,150 out of 2,400 men remained in the Pennsylvania Line. However, many discharged men later reenlisted and the remaining regiments accepted their old officers.

In the aftermath of the mutiny, the Pennsylvania Line underwent a reorganization. The 7th, 8th, 9th, 10th, and 11th Pennsylvania Regiments were disbanded and their remaining soldiers reassigned to the senior units. The 1st Pennsylvania Regiment reorganized at Philadelphia, Pennsylvania under Colonel Daniel Brodhead. The 2nd also regrouped at Philadelphia under Colonel Walter Stewart. The 3rd was posted to Reading with Colonel Thomas Craig in command; the 4th under Colonel William Butler went to Carlisle; the 5th under Colonel Richard Butler went to York; and the 6th under Colonel Richard Humpton went to Lancaster. The rank and file, though not the sergeants and musicians, were all furloughed until 15 March. On that date the regiments reassembled at their respective towns. In May, Wayne led the 2nd, 5th, and 6th Pennsylvania south to join operations against the British in Virginia.

The British agent Mason was tried and hanged as a spy. Controversially, Mason's civilian guide Ogden was also hanged as a spy.

The Commander-in-Chief of the Continental Army, George Washington, was not happy with the way the mutiny was dealt with. In a 2 February 1781 letter to Major General Nathanael Greene he stated: "[T]he affair of the Pennsylvania Line [was] compromised, by the intervention of the Civil Authority of the State: This (tho perhaps the only measure that could have been adopted in our circumstances) has been productive of ill consequences, by inducing other Troops to follow the same example—I mean a part of the Jersey Line, who mutinied in the same manner on the 19th." He is referring to the Pompton Mutiny in which Continental soldiers of the New Jersey Line, inspired by the success of their comrades of the Pennsylvania Line, attempted to achieve a similar success. Washington dealt with the Pompton mutiny quite differently: he immediately dispatched Major General Robert Howe from West Point to Pompton, where Howe "surrounded the Mutineers by surprize in their Quarters, reduced them to unconditional submission & executed two of their Instigators on the spot."

== In popular culture ==
The mutiny is depicted in historical novels, including The Proud and the Free (1950) by Howard Fast, told from the perspective of an enlisted man, and A Ride into Morning (1991) by Ann Rinaldi.

The AMC television series Turn: Washington's Spies dramatizes the mutiny on the 2017 episode "Nightmare".

== See also ==
- American Revolutionary War § Stalemate in the North. Places ' Pennsylvania Line Mutiny ' in overall sequence and strategic context.
- Jockey Hollow
