= Peter Kemble House =

- U.S. National Register of Historic Places
- U.S. Historic district – Contributing property
- New Jersey Register of Historic Places
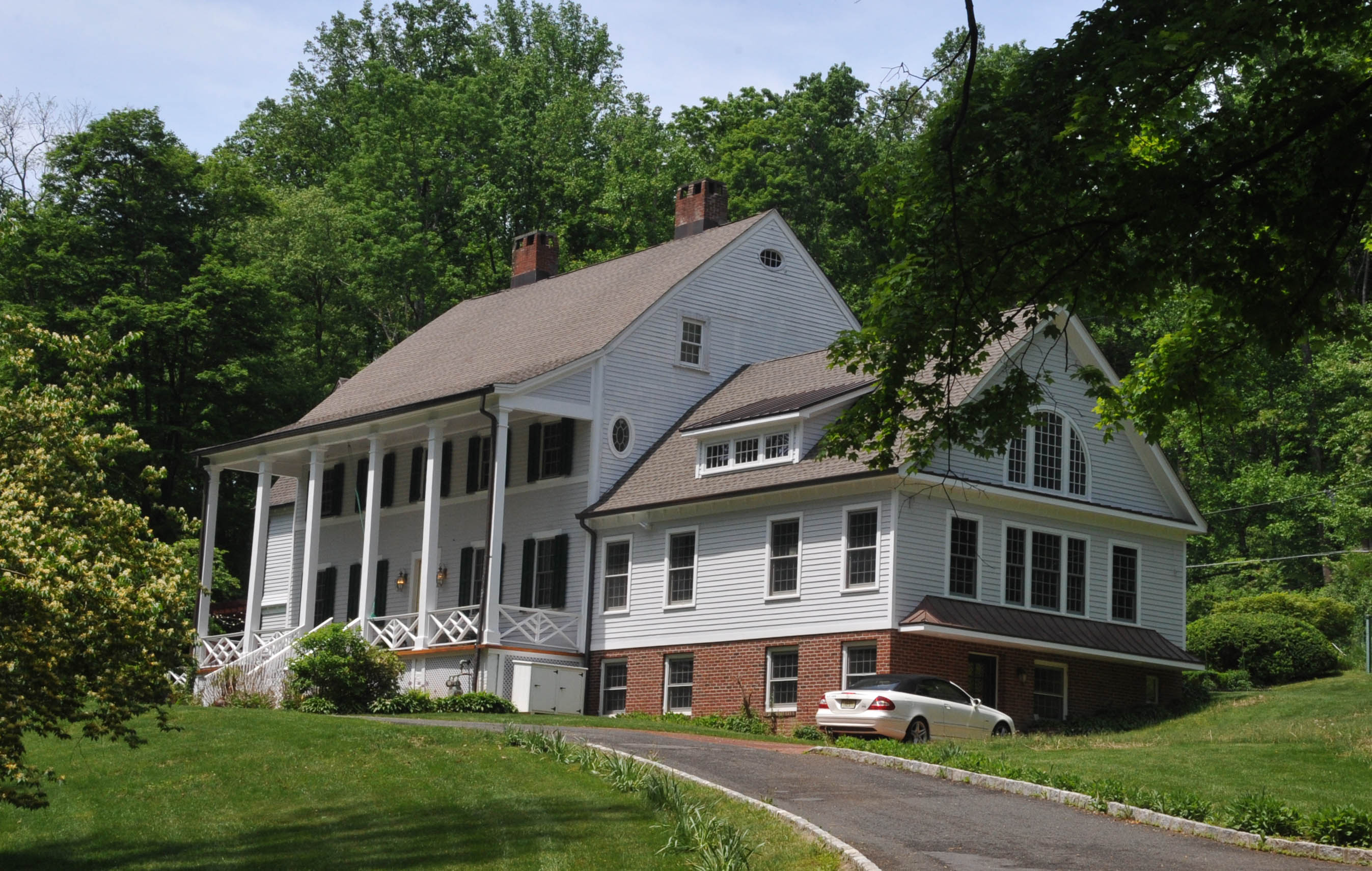

- Location within Morris County, New Jersey Location within New Jersey Location within the United States
- Location: Mount Kemble Avenue at Old Camp Road; Harding Township, New Jersey
- Nearest city: Morristown, New Jersey
- Coordinates: 40°45′30″N 74°31′27″W
- Built: c. 1750
- Architectural style: Georgian
- Part of: Tempe Wick Road–Washington Corners Historic District (ID00000959)
- NRHP reference No.: 80002510
- NJRHP No.: 2125

Significant dates
- Added to NRHP: August 26, 1980
- Designated CP: August 25, 2000
- Designated NJRHP: January 29, 1973

The Peter Kemble House is a historic house built around 1750 and located on Mount Kemble Avenue (U.S. Route 202) at Old Camp Road in Harding Township, New Jersey. It was documented by the Historic American Buildings Survey in 1937. It was added to the National Register of Historic Places on August 26, 1980, for its significance in commerce, military history, and government. The Georgian style house was added as a contributing property of the Tempe Wick Road–Washington Corners Historic District on August 25, 2000.

== History and description ==
The two and one-half story house was built around 1750 by Peter Kemble (1704–1789), who had moved here from New Brunswick after purchasing 1,250 acres (510 ha). In 1840, his son Richard Kemble sold the property to Harry S. Hoyt, who moved the house 700 yards (640 m) to its new location slightly closer to Morristown. In 1885, he sold it to David Hunter McAlpin (1816–1901). His son Charles William McAlpin (1866–1942) lived here next and donated over 100 acres (40 ha) for the creation of Jockey Hollow.

August 27–28, 1781, the First Brigade of the French Army marched past this house under command of General Comte de Rochambeau, along the route to Yorktown, Virginia.

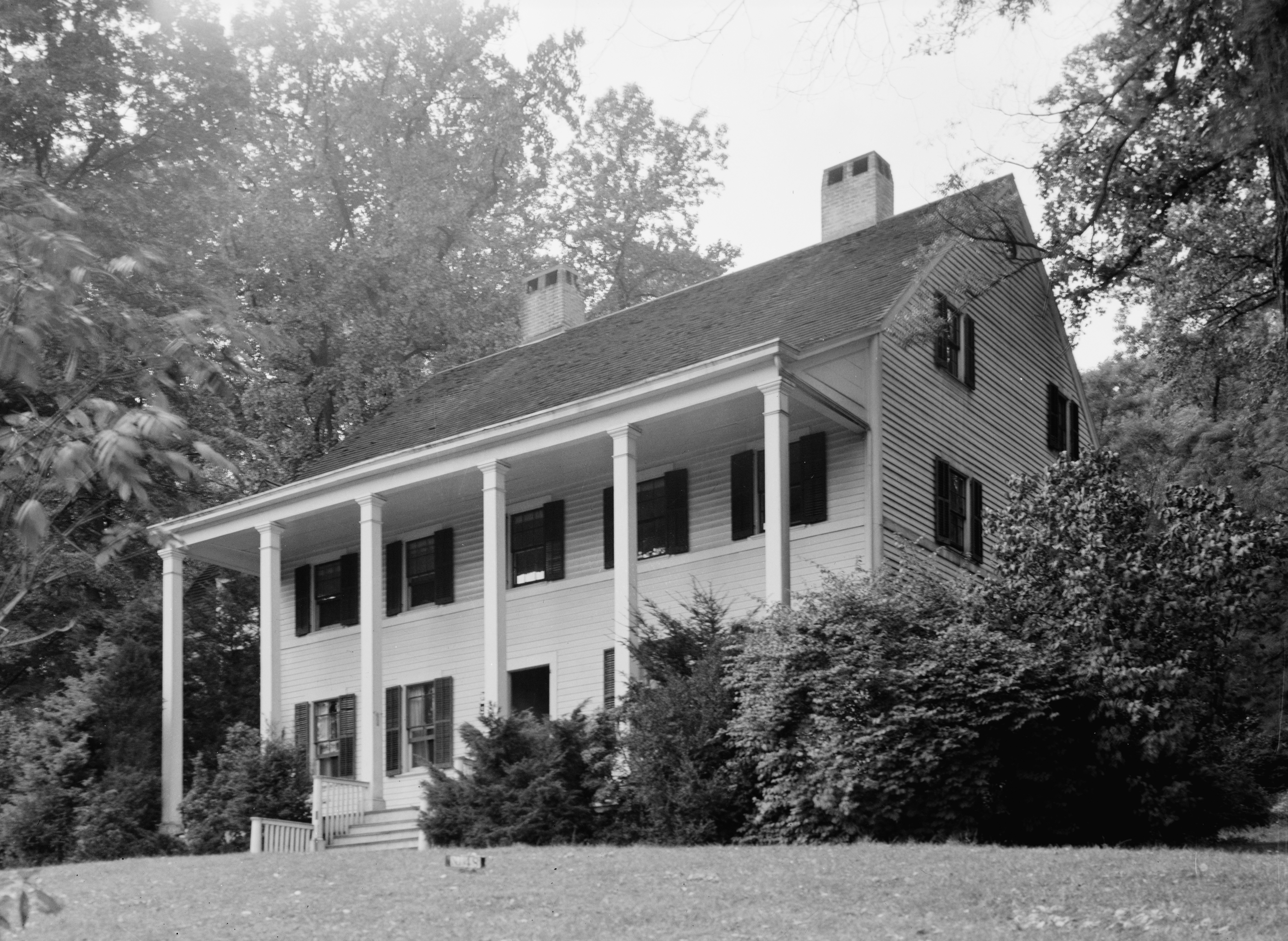
HABS photo from 1937

== See also ==
- National Register of Historic Places listings in Morris County, New Jersey
- List of the oldest buildings in New Jersey
- List of historic sites preserved along Rochambeau's route
