= The Staircase (1998 film) =

- Based on: The Staircase by Ann Rinaldi
- Written by: Christopher Lofton
- Directed by: Karen Arthur
- Starring: Barbara Hershey; William Petersen
- Music by: David Michael Frank
- Country of origin: United States
- Original language: English

Production
- Producers: Marty Eli Schwartz; Art Levinson (uncredited)
- Cinematography: Tom Neuwirth
- Editor: Craig Bassett
- Running time: 96 minutes
- Production companies: BWE Distribution; Craig Anderson Productions; TeleVest Entertainment

Original release
- Network: CBS
- Release: April 12, 1998

The Staircase is a 1998 American television film about the story of the spiral staircase, believed by some to be miraculously built, at the Loretto Chapel in Santa Fe, New Mexico. It stars Barbara Hershey as Mother Madalyn in charge of the chapel and William Petersen as Joad, the traveling carpenter with spiritual talent as well as woodworking skill. It is based on the novel, The Staircase by Ann Rinaldi.

== Plot ==
The sisters of the legendary Loretto Chapel in Santa Fe are nearing completion of a chapel, but the architect, contractor and laborers have all omitted stairs to the choir loft. This becomes a source of disagreement and contention between all parties until one day a mysterious drifter, Joad, arrives in town and is hired by the Reverend Mother Madalyn to design and build the staircase.

== Cast ==
- Barbara Hershey as Mother Madalyn
- William Petersen as Joad
- Diane Ladd as Sister Margaret
- Justin Louis as Mr. Mouly
- David Clennon as Simon Filger
- Paul Robert Langdon as Paco
- Anthony Ritter as Hernando
- Mark Sivertsen as Mr. Prewitt
- Rodney Grant as Geronimo
- Jane Goold as Sister Florian
- Boots Southerland as Deputy Carlson
- Paul Geoffrey as Samuels

== Reception ==
Variety said, "A heavily fictionalized recounting of a real-life event that still defies explanation, “The Staircase” is a fascinating anecdote stretched to fit what are evidently thought to be modern tastes."
