= Cast Two Shadows =

1998 novel by Ann Rinaldi

- First edition
- Author: Ann Rinaldi
- Language: English
- Series: Great Episodes
- Genre: Historical
- Publisher: Harcourt Books
- Publication date: 1998
- Publication place: United States
- Media type: Print (paperback)
- Pages: 304 pp
- ISBN: 0-15-200881-0
- OCLC: 38389984
- LC Class: PZ7.R459 Cas 1998
- Preceded by: An Acquaintance with Darkness
- Followed by: The Coffin Quilt

Cast Two Shadows: The American Revolution in South Carolina is a 1998 historical novel by Ann Rinaldi, a part of the Great Episodes series. It is told in first-person.

== Plot ==
It is 1780, in the midst of the American Revolution, in Camden, South Carolina, and fourteen-year-old Caroline Whitaker, her step mother Sarah and her bratty older half-sister Georgia Ann are confined to one small room of their spacious Southern plantation home. Caroline is the light-skinned daughter of the plantation's owner and a slave who has been raised by Mama Sarah. British soldiers, led by Colonel Rawdon are occupying the place. The Colonel is also courting Georgia Ann.

Caroline and her Negra caretaker, who is also her grandmother, Miz Melindy, travel to get her 'almost' brother Johnny. He converts into an American patriot, after being whipped and spanked by a British officer for not handing over his second most prized horse- Grey Goose, aside from the most thoroughbred blooded mare in all of St. Mark's Parish, Fearnaught. Johnny's horses make many conflicts throughout the novel, including Caroline's sore wound over Kit's dab and dabbing.

== Reception ==
In a starred review, Booklist's Susan Dove Lempke praised Cast Two Shadows for being "impeccably researched", a point with which Kirkus Reviews agreed, highlighting how Rinaldi "deftly incorporat[es] facts into the background". Lempke also noted that the book is " vividly detailed, and filled with very human characters". Kirkus similarly discussed how Rinaldi "leav[es] most of the violence offstage", which "keeps the focus on her characters".

School Library Journal's Star E. Smith called the novel "deftly plotted and fast-paced".

Lempke praised Cast Two Shadows as a novel "about something that matters", in this case "truth, secrets, and the difficulty of determining the right thing to do". Smith also commented on the novel's "provocative themes". Despite this, Kirkus Reviews suggested Anna Myers’s Keeping Room for readers looking for "a less disingenuous story set in the same place and time [that] offers a more direct view of the unusual brutality that characterized the war in the Carolinas".
