= Loretto Chapel =

Former Roman Catholic church

- U.S. Historic district – Contributing property
- NM State Register of Cultural Properties
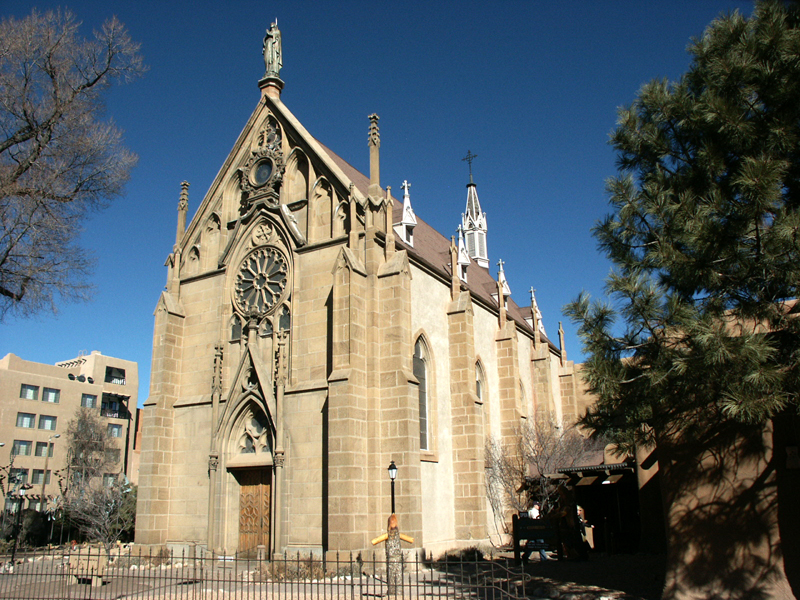
- The chapel in 2006

- Location within New Mexico Location within the United States
- Location: 207 Old Santa Fe Trail, Santa Fe, New Mexico
- Coordinates: 35°41′8″N 105°56′16″W
- Built: 1878 (148 years ago)
- Architect: Projectus Mouly
- Architectural style: Gothic Revival
- Part of: Santa Fe Historic District (ID73001150)
- NMSRCP No.: 218

Significant dates
- Designated CP: July 23, 1973
- Designated NMSRCP: June 20, 1971

The Loretto Chapel is a former Roman Catholic church in Santa Fe, New Mexico, United States, that is now a privately owned museum and a wedding chapel.

It is known for its unusual helix-shaped spiral staircase (the "Miraculous Stair"). It has been the subject of legend, and the circumstances surrounding its construction and its builder were considered miraculous by the Sisters of Loretto, who credited Saint Joseph with its construction.

== History ==
The chapel was commissioned by the Sisters of Loretto for their girls' school, Loretto Academy, in 1873. Archbishop Jean-Baptiste Lamy had brought in two French architects, Antoine Mouly and his son Projectus, to work on the St. Francis Cathedral project, and suggested that the Sisters could make use of their services on the side to build a much-needed chapel for the academy. Projectus ended up being the main architect for the project, basing his Gothic Revival design—complete with spires, buttress, and stained glass windows imported from France via the Santa Fe Trail—on the Sainte-Chapelle in Paris. The chapel was built from locally quarried sandstone and took five years to complete, being officially consecrated in 1878.

Loretto Chapel was used on a daily basis by the students and nuns of Loretto Academy until the school closed in 1968. Afterwards, it became a privately owned museum and wedding venue, while the rest of the Academy campus was demolished. Many people from all over the world came to see the chapel.

== Staircase ==
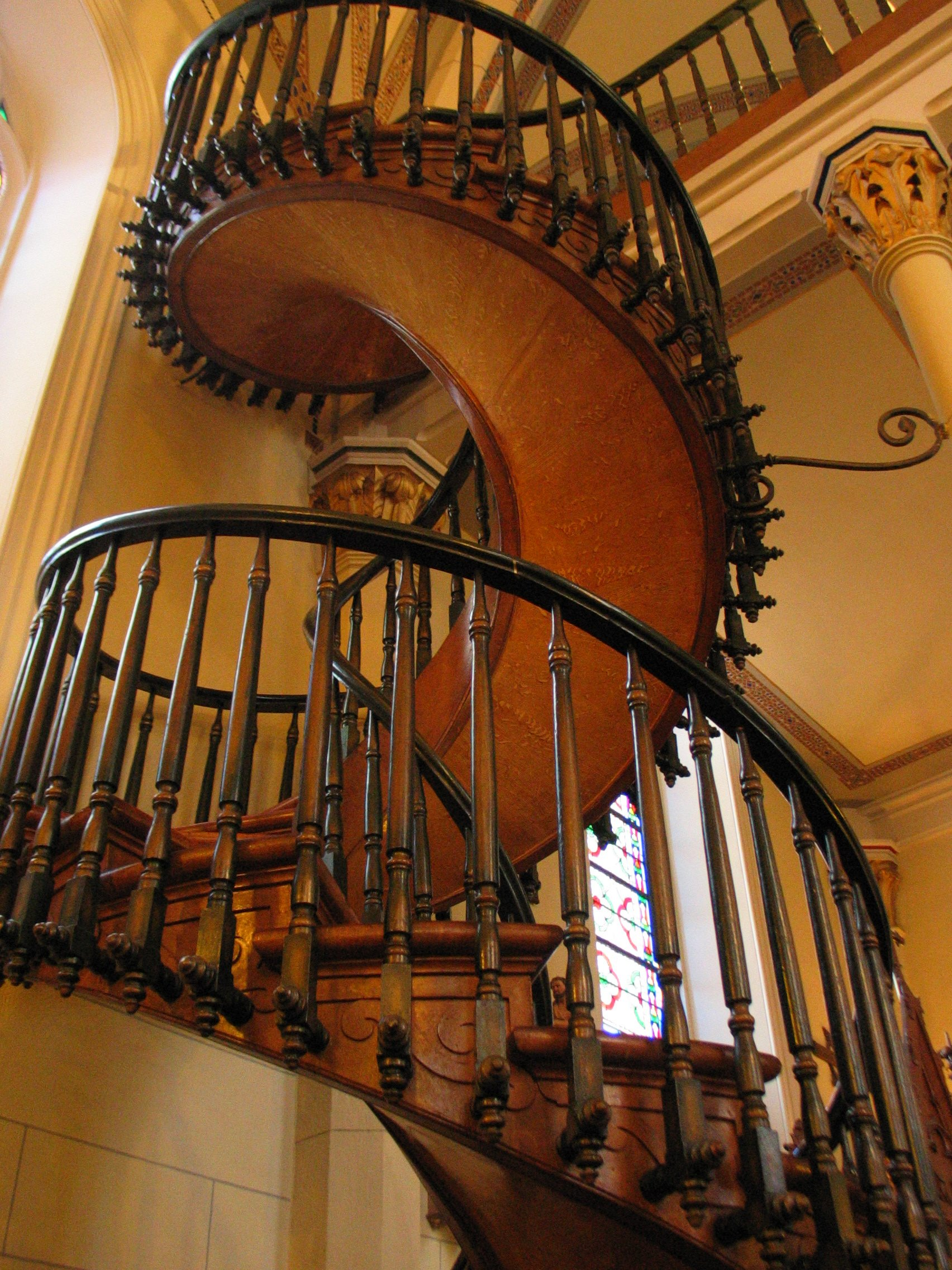
The Loretto Chapel spiral staircase

=== Description ===
Loretto Chapel is best known for its helix-shaped staircase (nicknamed "Miraculous Stair"), which rises 20 feet (6.1 m) to the choir loft while making two full turns, all without the support of a newel or central pole. The staircase is built mostly out of wood and is held together by wooden pegs, with no glue, nails or other hardware used. The inner stringer consists of seven wooden segments joined together with pegs, while the longer outer stringer has nine segments. The exact wood used to build the staircase has been confirmed to be a type of spruce which is probably not native to New Mexico.

There are 33 stairs, which has been noted to be the age of Christ at the time of his death.

The handrails were added later, in 1887, and an iron bracket was later attached to a column to add additional support. The staircase is supported by an inner wood stringer.

Apart from any claims of its miraculous nature, the staircase has been described as a remarkable feat of woodworking. According to a Washington Post column by Tim Carter:

It's a magnificent work of art that humbles me as a master carpenter. To create a staircase like this using modern tools would be a feat. It's mind-boggling to think about constructing such a marvel with crude hand tools, no electricity and minimal resources.

According to another professional carpenter, who was interviewed by Ben Radford for his 2014 book Mysterious New Mexico:

The execution is just incredible. The theory of how to do it, to bend it around in a two-turn spiral, that's some difficult arithmetic there.

=== History ===
The staircase was built sometime between 1877 and 1881. By this point, the chapel was substantially complete but still lacking access to the choir loft, possibly due to the unexpected death of the architect, Projectus Mouly, in 1879.

According to the version of events passed down by the Sisters of Loretto, multiple builders were consulted but were not able to find a workable solution due to the confined quarters. In response, the nuns prayed for nine straight days to Saint Joseph, the patron saint of carpenters. On the last day of the novena, a mysterious stranger appeared and offered to build the staircase. He worked alone using only a few simple hand tools and disappeared afterwards without collecting his pay or the Sisters learning his identity. More fantastical versions of the story have the work taking place overnight, while according to others, it took six to eight months.

The finished staircase was an impressive work of carpentry, seeming to defy physics as it ascended 20 feet (6.1 m) without any obvious means of support. The Sisters of Loretto viewed its construction as a miracle and believed that the mysterious builder must have been Saint Joseph himself. As the story spread, the staircase became one of Santa Fe's most famous tourist attractions.

The staircase as originally built lacked handrails and was reportedly so frightening to descend that some of the nuns and students did so on their hands and knees. Eventually, railings were added in 1887 by another craftsman, Phillip August Hesch. The stairs have been mostly closed to the public since the chapel became a privately run museum in the 1960s.

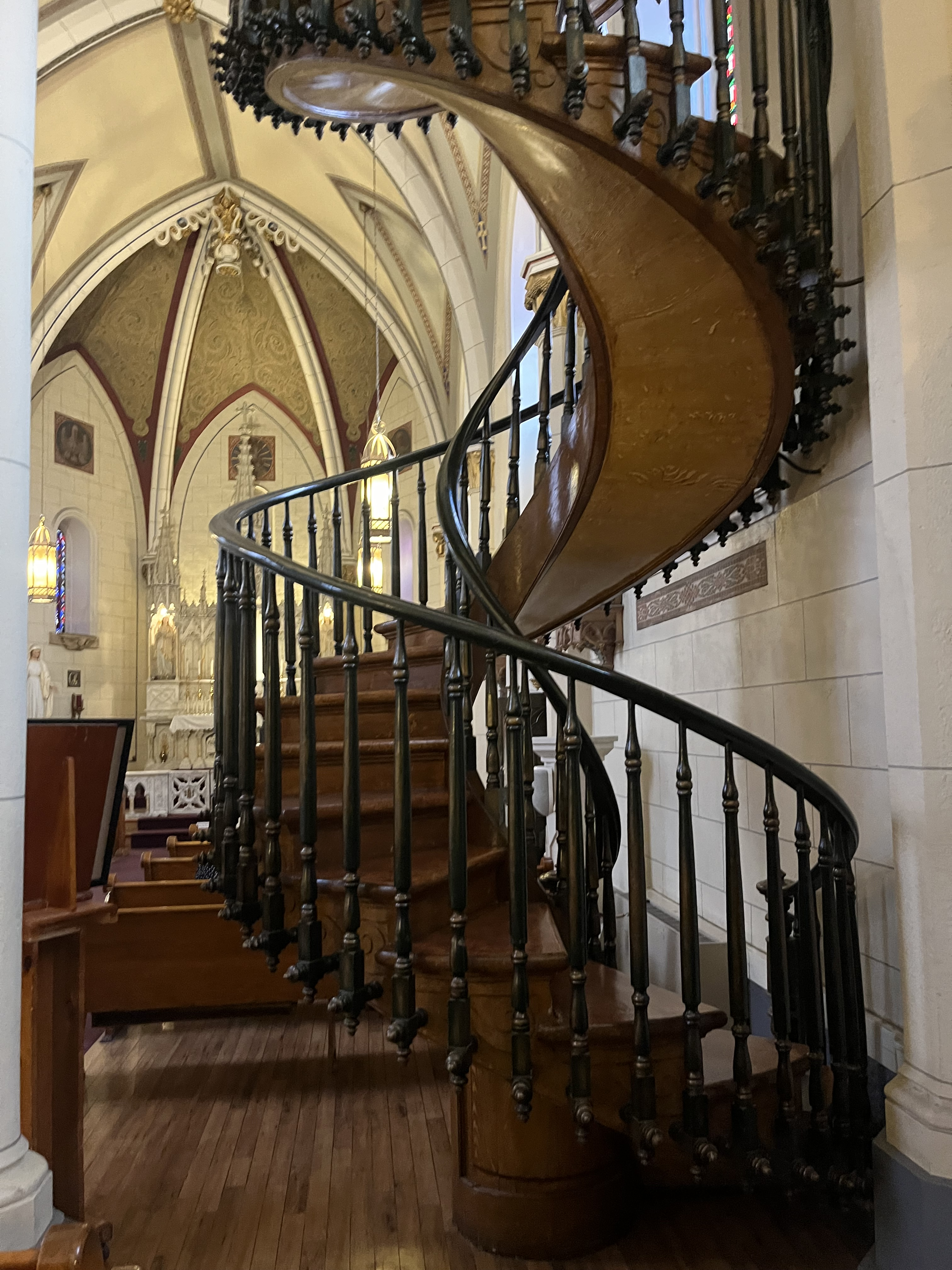

=== Physical aspects ===
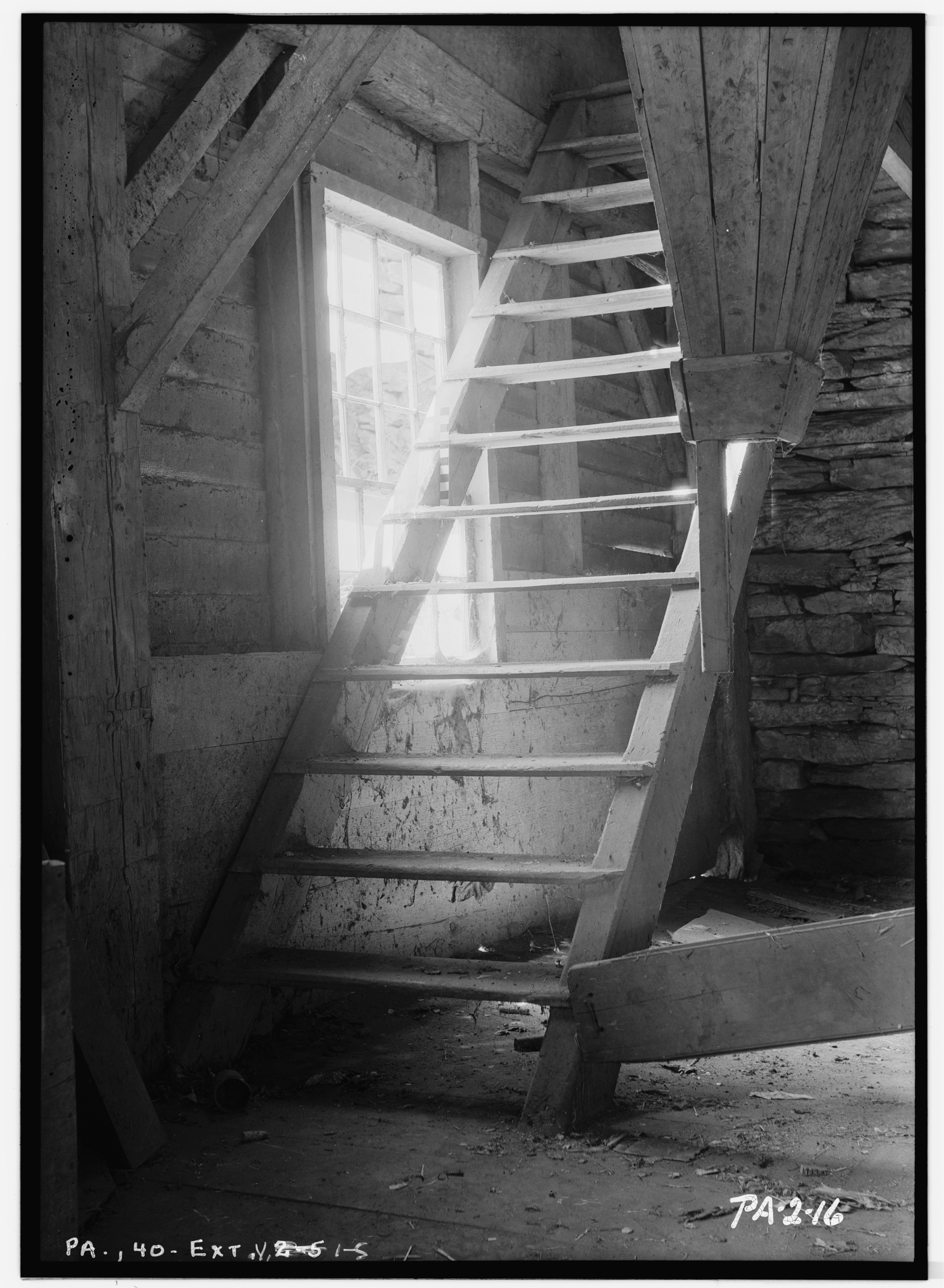
A conventional wooden staircase supported by stringers

The staircase lacks the newel or central pole usually used to support and stabilize a spiral staircase, and therefore the means of supporting the weight is not obvious. However, the staircase is supported by its stringers just like a conventional (straight) staircase, although in this case each stringer is twisted into a helix. Observers have also noted that the inside stringer has such a tight radius that it is able to function similarly to a straight center support. According to an analysis by a professional carpenter in Mysterious New Mexico, the assembly of the stringers from overlapping segments joined by wood glue creates a laminate that is actually stronger than the wood alone. Additionally, the use of wooden pegs rather than nails prevents degradation of the joints due to compression set as the wood swells against the nails due to changes in humidity or temperature.

Although the staircase as built lacked any external bracing, an iron support bracket was added in 1887 at the same time as the railings. This may have been intended to limit the degree of vertical travel arising from the helical shape, which effectively makes the staircase behave as a giant coil spring and is part of the reason spiral staircases usually have a central support. Even after this modification, users of the staircase reported "a certain amount of springiness". Nevertheless, it was able to hold a significant amount of weight, as attested by a photo taken around 1959 of at least 20 choir members posing on the steps.

=== Identity of the builder ===
In the early 2000s, amateur historian Mary Jean Cook theorized the probable builder of the staircase as François-Jean "Frank" or "Frenchy" Rochas (1843–1894), a reclusive rancher and occasional carpenter who came to New Mexico from France around the 1870s. A key piece of evidence was a short article in the Santa Fe New Mexican in 1895 describing his death by murder, which noted:

He was a Frenchman, and was favorably known in Santa Fe as an expert worker in wood. He build [sic] the handsome stair-case in the Loretto chapel and at St. Vincent sanitarium.

Cook also found an entry in the Sisters' logbook stating that Rochas had been paid US$150 (equivalent to $5,004 in 2025) for "wood" in 1881, confirming that he had done some type of carpentry work for them. At the time of his death, Rochas reportedly owned an extensive set of carpentry tools including:

five saws, a saw clamp and set, nine planes, nineteen moulding planes, two squares, five gauges, six chisels, two gouges, a draw knife, a brace, three augers, ten auger bits, a reamer, two clamps, and a pair of trammel points (for drawing large circles)

Others have disputed Cook's theory. John Clark, a political speechwriter, writing in the National Catholic Register, stated that the memo in the logbook read "Paid for wood — Mr. Rochas for N. School" and contends this refers to a nearby school the sisters hired him to build, and that the logbook makes no mention of a staircase. However, other sources quote the memo as more generally stating: "Paid for wood Mr Rochas, $150.00."

=== Similar stairs ===
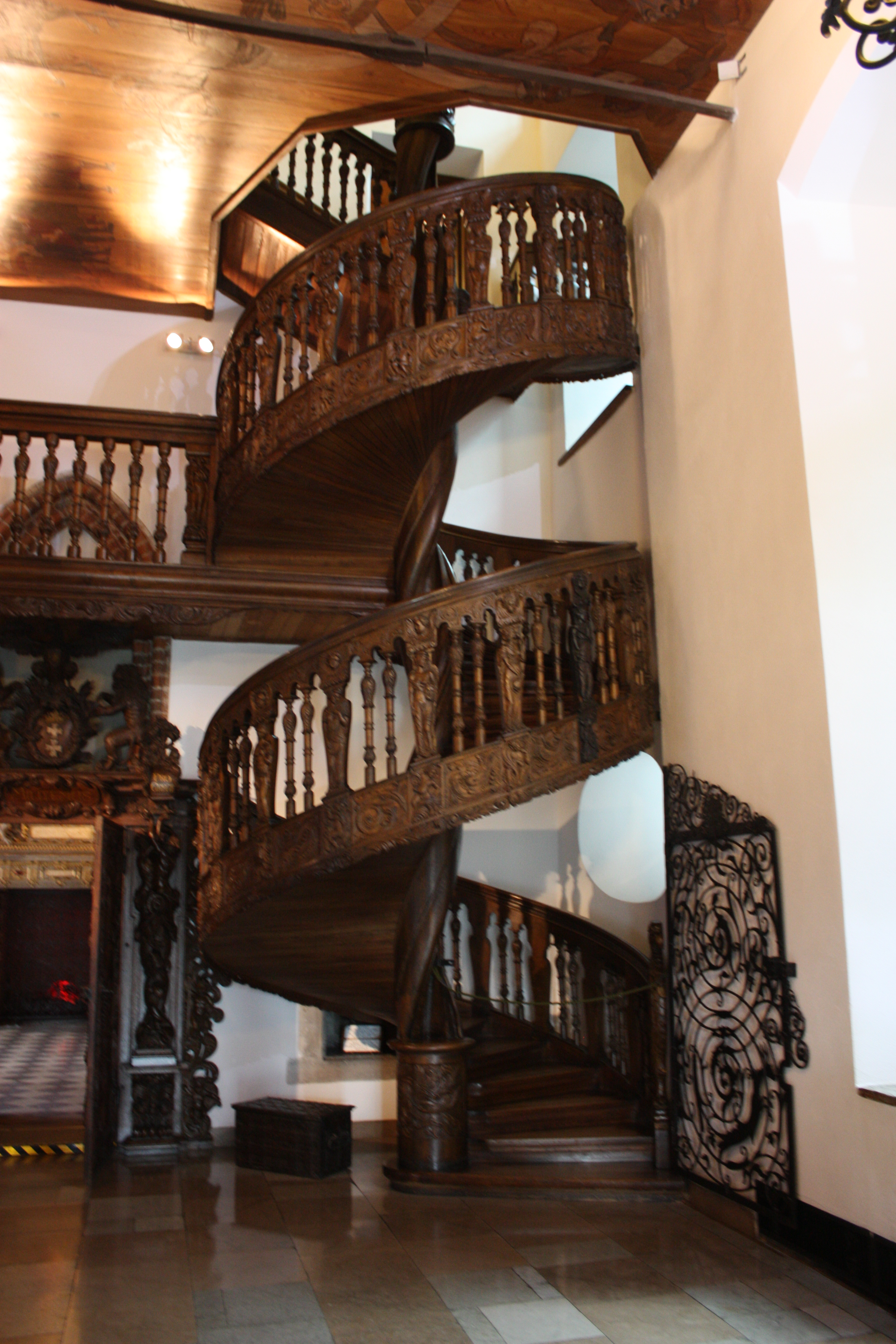
Spiral stairs of Gdańsk Town Hall

Although the design of the Loretto stairs is highly unusual, other spiral staircases without center supports are known to exist. One example can be found at the Old Washoe Club in Virginia City, Nevada, which also dates to the 1870s. This staircase was described by Ripley's Believe It or Not! as "the longest of its kind without a supporting pole", although it has fewer turns than the Loretto staircase.

Another staircase is in the Gdańsk Town Hall in Poland, which was reported to the New Mexican in 1944 by a government official named Bonnie Foster. The paper wrote:

It is tall, spiral, and without steel nails, but the wood is different. It is in the town hall, of the 14th to the 16th century. How it was constructed, and whether there is a miracle story back of it, Mrs. Foster could not say. But she declared it is strikingly like St. Joseph's in design.

== Loretto Academy ==
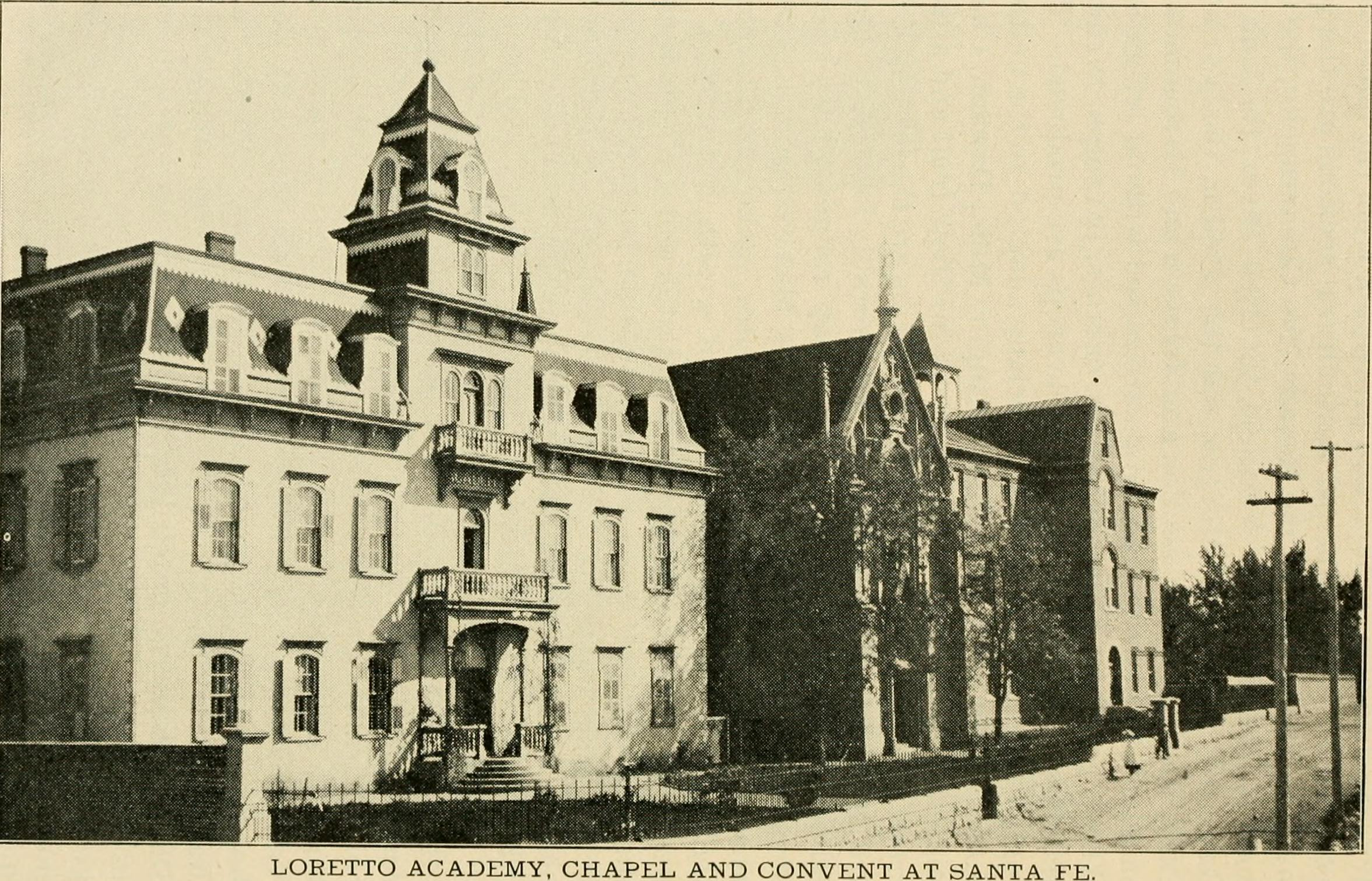
Loretto Academy in 1904, including the chapel at center

Loretto Academy was founded in 1853 and continued to operate until 1968. Afterward, the previously all-male St. Michael's High School turned co-ed in order to accommodate the Academy's female students.

== In popular culture ==
The case was investigated and subsequently re-enacted in the Unsolved Mysteries episode "Miracle Staircase” (1990; S03 E10).

The story was the subject of the television film The Staircase (1998), starring Barbara Hershey and William Petersen.

Young-adult author Ann Rinaldi based her book The Staircase (2000) on the Loretto Chapel.

The chapel figured prominently in Canadian author Michael O'Brien's novel Voyage to Alpha Centauri (2013). In flashbacks, protagonist Dr. Neil de Hoyos recalls visiting the chapel and marveling at the staircase as a child in Santa Fe.

Television show The UnXplained investigated the spiral staircase in an episode entitled "Mysterious Structures" (2019; S01 E02).

The chapel was the setting of records research in the Dark Winds episode entitled "Hooghandi" (2022; S01 E04).

The chapel and its staircase was the subject of Jimmy Akin's Mysterious World episode 232 "The Miraculous Spiral Staircase".

The staircase and location was mentioned by Jack Reacher in the first episode of the Reacher spinoff series Neagley (2026).

== See also ==
- List of churches in the Roman Catholic Archdiocese of Santa Fe
