= Tempe Wick Road–Washington Corners Historic District =

- U.S. National Register of Historic Places
- U.S. Historic district
- New Jersey Register of Historic Places
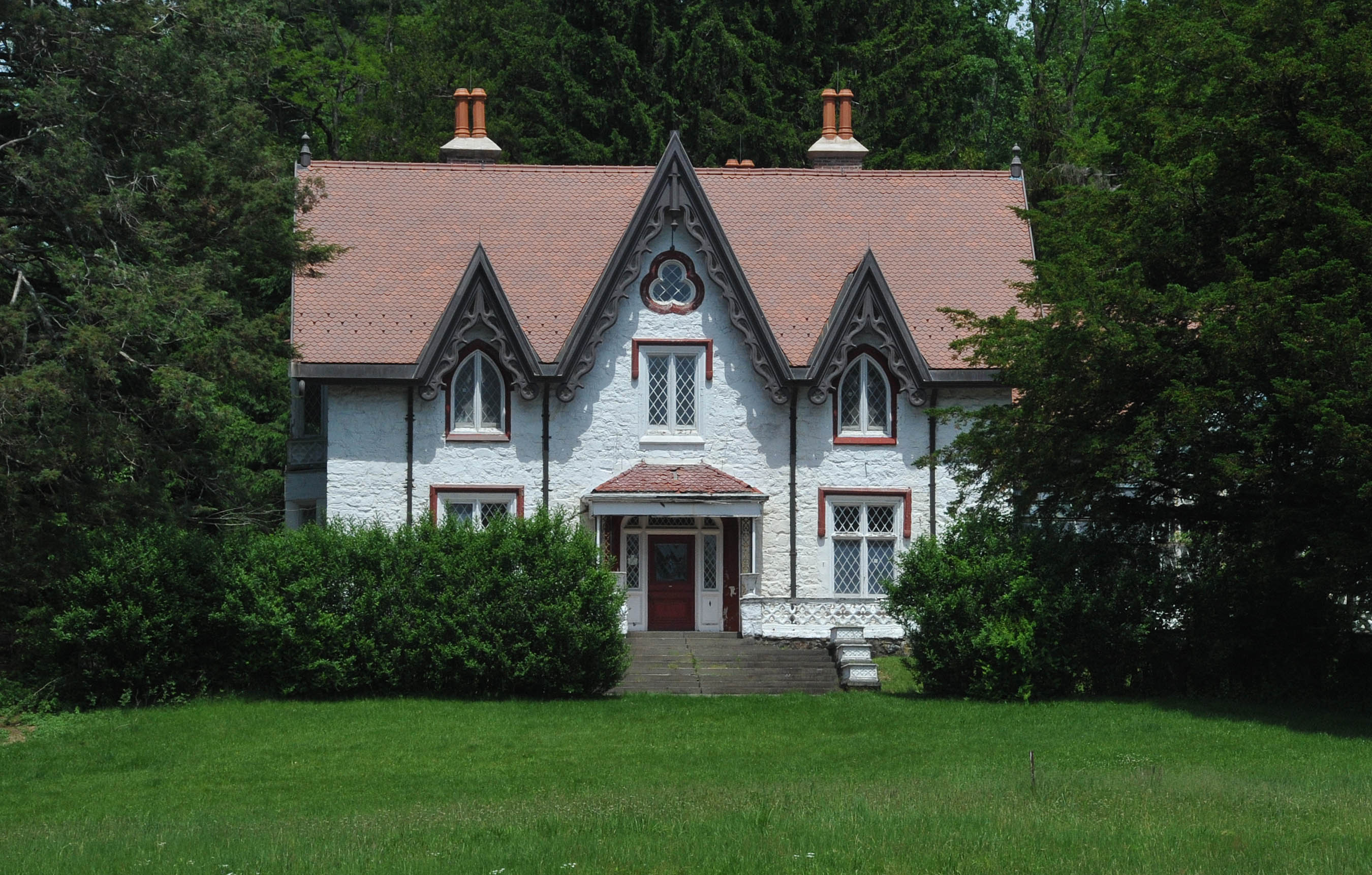
- Glen Alpin

- Location within Morris County, New Jersey Location within New Jersey Location within the United States
- Location: Corey Lane, Cemetery Road, Tempe Wick, Kennaday, Leddell, and Jockey Hollow Roads; Harding Township and Mendham Township, New Jersey
- Coordinates: 40°45′56″N 74°33′30″W
- Area: 353 acres (143 ha)
- Architect: Campbell Vorhess; Stanford White
- Architectural style: Colonial, Colonial Revival
- NRHP reference No.: 00000959
- NJRHP No.: 316

Significant dates
- Added to NRHP: August 25, 2000
- Designated NJRHP: June 27, 2000

The Tempe Wick Road–Washington Corners Historic District is a 353-acre (143 ha) historic district located in Harding Township and Mendham Township in Morris County, New Jersey. It extends along Tempe Wick Road from Mount Kemble Avenue (U.S. Route 202) to Cold Hill Road, and short segments of Corey Lane, Cemetery Road, Kennaday Road, Leddell Road, and Jockey Hollow Road. Tempe Wick Road is named for Temperance Wick.

The district was added to the National Register of Historic Places on August 25, 2000, for its significance in architecture and military history. The district includes 44 contributing buildings, 6 contributing sites, 10 contributing structures, and 4 contributing objects.

== History and description ==
The Peter Kemble House, previously listed on the NRHP individually, is included in the district. The Henry S. Hoyt House, also known as Glen Alpin, was built c. 1840 with Gothic Revival style.

== Gallery ==
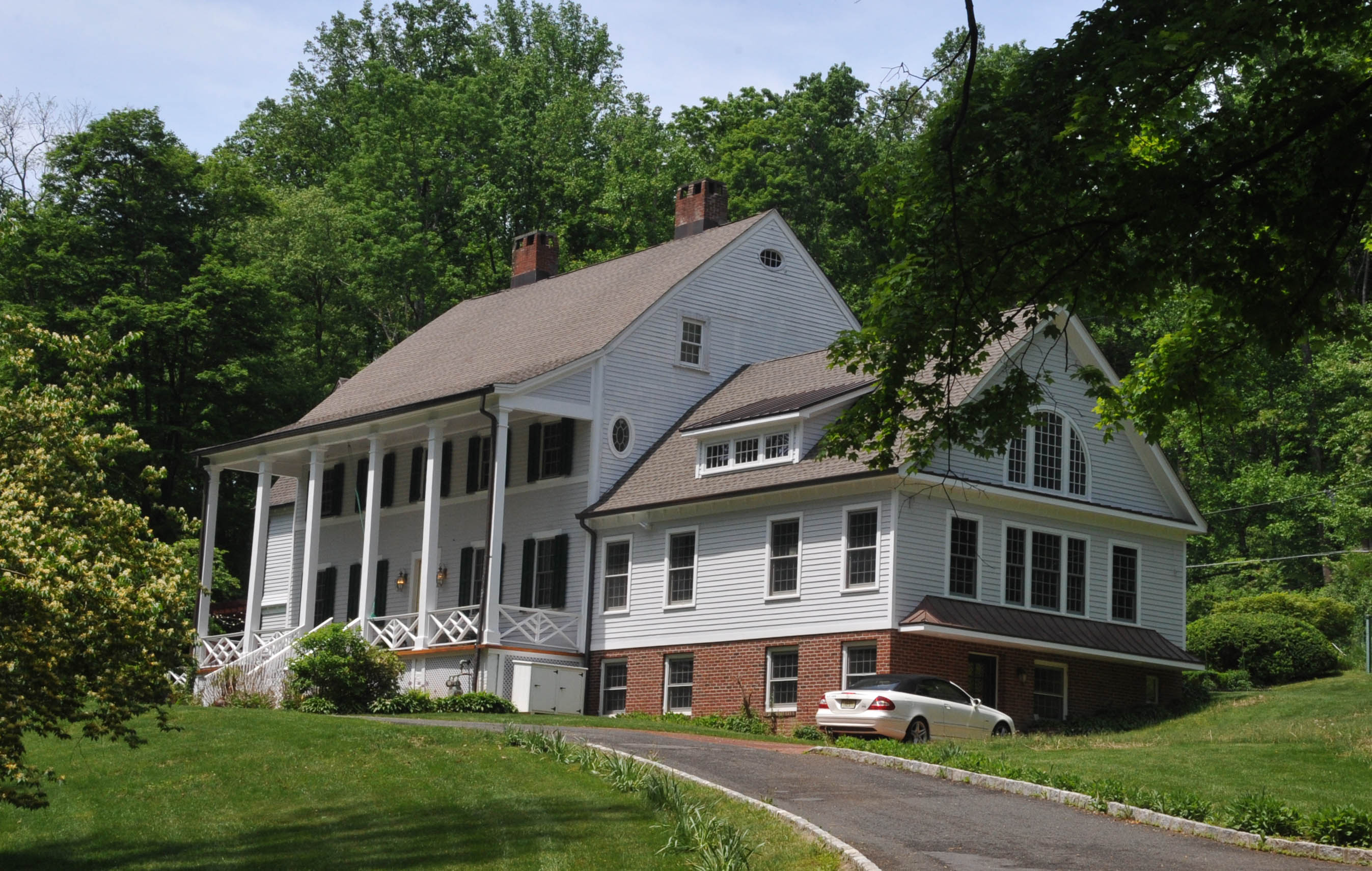
Peter Kemble House

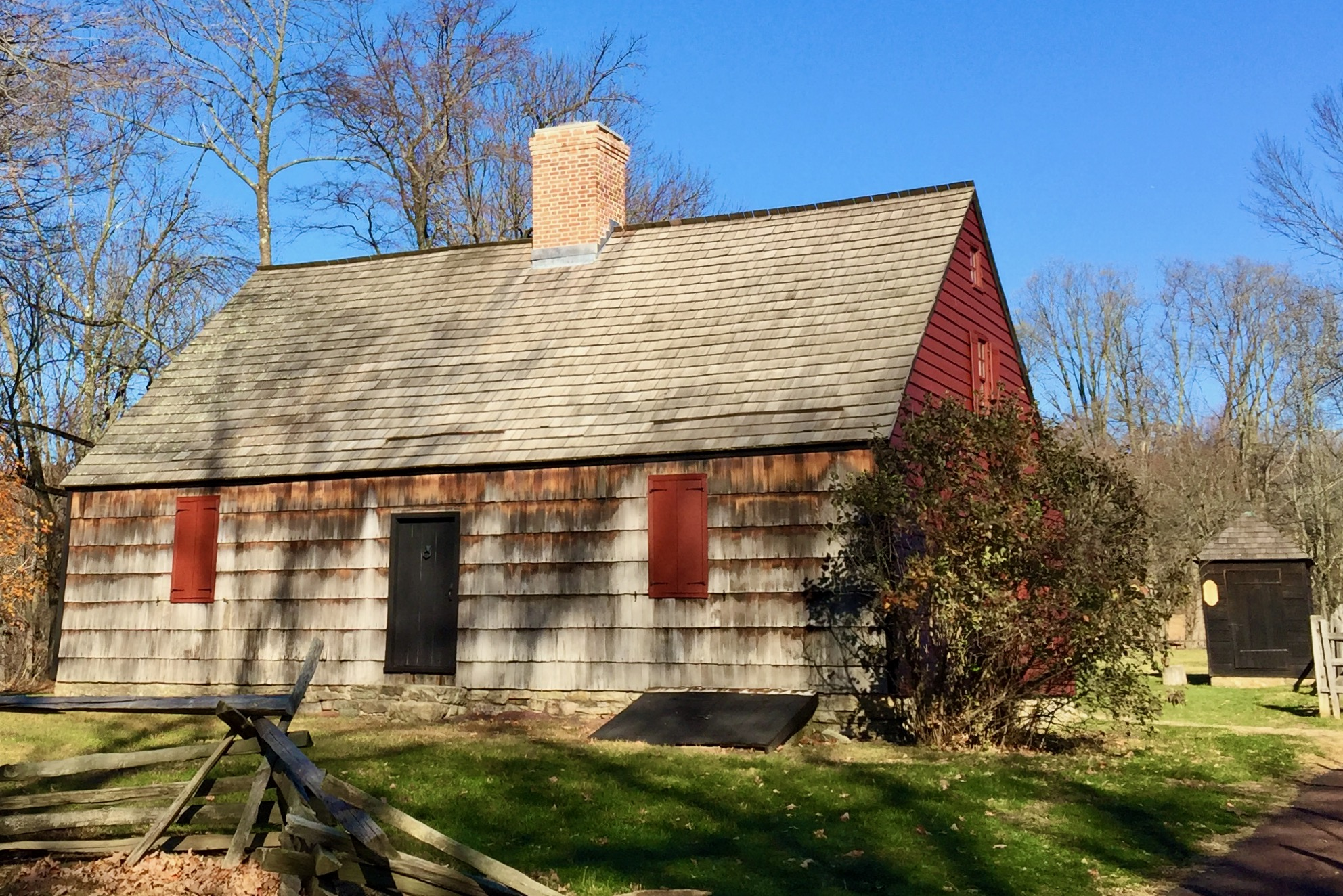
Tempe Wick House at Jockey Hollow

== See also ==
- Jockey Hollow
- New Jersey Brigade Encampment Site
- National Register of Historic Places listings in Morris County, New Jersey
