= Hang a Thousand Trees with Ribbons =

1996 historical novel by Ann Rinaldi

Hang a Thousand trees with Ribbons
- First edition
- Author: Ann Rinaldi
- Language: English
- Series: Great Episodes
- Genre: Historical novel
- Publisher: Scholastic
- Publication date: 1996
- Publication place: United States
- Media type: Print (Paperback)
- Pages: 352 pp
- ISBN: 0-15-200876-4
- OCLC: 34150871
- LC Class: PZ7.R459 Han 1996
- Preceded by: Keep Smiling Through
- Followed by: An Acquaintance with Darkness

Hang a Thousand Trees with Ribbons is a 1996 historical novel by Ann Rinaldi about the life of African American poet Phillis Wheatley. It is recommended for young adult readers in grades 6 to 8.

The story, told in first-person narration, follows the life of Phillis Wheatley, the first published African-American poet. The story recounts her capture by black slavers in Africa and the horrors of the Middle Passage as experienced by a woman of intelligence and artistic ability when society assumed Africans were not endowed with either. Ann Rinaldi's vivid portrayal of the first African American poet is set against the backdrop of the American War of Independence, so there is a double theme of search for liberty in the novel.
