= The Fifth of March =

1993 novel by Ann Rinaldi

- First edition (publ. Harcourt)
- Author: Ann Rinaldi
- Subject: Boston Massacre
- Publisher: Harcourt
- Publication date: November 1, 1993
- ISBN: 0-15-200343-6

The Fifth of March is a 1993 novel about the Boston Massacre (of March 5, 1770, pre-Revolutionary War) by historian and author Ann Rinaldi, who was also the author of other historical fiction novels, such as Girl in Blue and A Break with Charity.

This book is about a fourteen-year-old indentured servant named Rachel Marsh who finds herself changing as she meets many people, including young Matthew Kilroy, a British private in the 29th regiment who is not very easy to get along with. She has a friend named Jane, who was her first ever friend.

== Plot ==
Rachel Marsh, aged 14, is an indentured servant to John Adams and his wife Abigail Adams. Her father and mother have died, leaving Uncle Eb as her only living relative. However, Eb is greedy, uncaring, and often exploits Rachel. After a falling out over Eb wanting Rachel to spy on the Adamses, Eb disowns her. Rachel confides this to Abigail Adams, who comforts her and gives her money to go buy books at Henry Knox's bookstore. Rachel is inspired by Knox and begins working to better her education.

Later, a British ship arrives. Many Bostonians are unhappy with this new change and begin rioting. Nevertheless, the British post sentries outside many residences, including the Adams'. While coming back from the bakery, the sentry outside the Adams house, Private Matthew Kilroy, challenges Rachel. She notices that he is fearful and hungry looking. Taking pity on him, she gives the freezing sentry a few scraps of food.

As their friendship develops, Matthew begins pushing Rachel for more and wants her to kiss him. However, Rachel does not want to do so, and would rather remain friends. Their relationship is very tumultuous.

Rachel's close friend, Jane, suddenly drags Rachel out of bed one night. Rachel follows Jane to find a mob of citizens fighting against the British soldiers. She sees Matthew shoot and stab a defenseless man. This event would be known as the Boston Massacre. Later, Matthew is accused of murder.

Rachel sneaks food to Matthew, feeling pity for him.

John Adams defends the British soldiers, but two of them, including Matthew, are accused of manslaughter. Matthew is branded and shipped back to England. Matthew proposes matrimony to Rachel but she refuses him. Mr. Adams feels that it would be best to let go of Rachel when they move back to Braintree. He gets Rachel a position in Philadelphia which he thinks would suit her. She is about to begin a new chapter in her life.

== Reception ==
In a starred review, Booklist's Chris Sherman highlighted how "Rinaldi provides a vivid picture of colonial life and the pre-Revolutionary War period, including the disagreements among various American factions and the frightening actions of mobs and British retaliation". Kirkus Reviews similarly praised the book for being "carefully researched and lovingly written". On behalf of the Historical Novel Society, Wendy A. Zollo discussed how "Rinaldi writes in a compelling and colorful fashion without drawing on dramatics", and noted that "the Boston Massacre and its consequences are presented in an evenly flowing and captivating way that should keep a young reader’s attention".

Multiple reviewers commented on the book's relevance to the time it was published, which could make it a valuable conversation starter. Kirkus Reviews referred to it as "fortuitously timed" with its "strong parallels to recent events". Publishers Weekly wrote, "Historical events aren't as neat and tidy as they appear in history books, nor are they dissimilar from modern happenings (i.e., the Rodney King case), as Rinaldi [...] ably demonstrates in this painstakingly researched tale". Sherman also found that many of the issues discussed in the book, including "the role of peacekeeping forces, the use of violence to achieve political goals, and the courage required to take a stand", to be "as significant today as they were at the time", making it a good choice for classroom discussions. Considering a classroom environment, Publishers Weekly added that "how Rachel acts according to her newly awakened social conscience and sense of self-worth makes for engrossing and educational reading".

Booklist also reviewed the audiobook narrated by Melissa Hughes.
