= An Acquaintance with Darkness =

1997 novel by Ann Rinaldi

- First edition
- Author: Ann Rinaldi
- Language: English
- Series: Great Episodes
- Genre: Historical novel, Children's novel
- Publisher: Harcourt Books
- Publication date: 1997
- Publication place: United States
- Media type: Print (Paperback)
- Pages: 384 pp
- ISBN: 978-0-15-202197-9
- OCLC: 36138335
- Preceded by: Hang a Thousand Trees with Ribbons
- Followed by: Cast Two Shadows

An Acquaintance with Darkness is a historical fiction novel by Ann Rinaldi. It is part of the Great Episodes series. It is told in first-person narration.

== Plot summary ==
An Acquaintance with Darkness is the story of 14-year-old Emily Pigbush who lives with her mother in Washington, D.C., in 1865. Emily's father died during the Civil War while fighting for the Union. Now the Pigbushes' final servant, Ella May, has left because she was freed, leaving Emily to care for her mother alone. However, Emily sometimes has the help of her close friend, sixteen-year-old Annie Surratt and Annie's brother Johnny a twenty-year-old, whose mother runs the boarding house across the street.

Emily's mother is near death, and Emily hopes to go live with Annie afterward her mother dies because her father has died in a battle of Charleston. Emily's mother's only wish is that Emily at all costs not live with her uncle, Dr. Valentine Bransby, after her death. Soon, Emily's mother dies after hearing that the Civil War was over. But then, on April 15, 1865, President Abraham Lincoln is assassinated by John Wilkes Booth in Ford Theatre. Mrs. Mary Surratt, Annie's mother, comes under suspicion of the authorities, as she may have harbored Booth; Johnny Surrat is also wanted by the police for possibly being involved in the assassination. On Annie's advice, Emily reluctantly goes to live with her uncle, Dr. Valentine Bransby.

Living with Uncle Valentine, Emily learns that Valentine is actually quite a talented doctor who strives for more discoveries in the medical field with the changing times. Emily meets Valentine's assistant, Marietta, his housekeeper, Maude, and Maude's dwarf husband, Merry. She also meets Robert deGraaf, Valentine's medical student. As Emily later figures out, Valentine, Marietta, Robert, and Maude are involved in body snatching (cadaver theft) in Washington.

Emily is at first disgusted by Valentine's deeds. However, after helping obtain an illegal body for her uncle for medical purposes, Emily realizes that her uncle is stealing bodies with the purpose of helping advance the medical field and saving more lives. Meanwhile, Mrs. Surratt, is publicly hanged along with several other accomplices, and Valentine, Robert, Annie, and Emily attend the execution. Annie sells her house and flees Washington, changing her name, and leaving Emily behind. In the end, Emily tells Robert that she would like to become a nurse one day and he replies that she can not only become a nurse, but a doctor instead.

== Reception ==
Publishers Weekly complemented the plot calling it "fast-paced and dramatic, with a wealth of interesting background information."

== See also ==
- McEntyre, Marilyn Chandler (October 16, 2006). "Rinaldi, Ann An Acquaintance with Darkness". non-fiction, Arts, and Medicine Database. New York University.
- "An Acquaintance with Darkness by Ann Rinaldi". Publishers Weekly. September 29, 1997.
