= My Heart is on the Ground =

1999 novel by Ann Rinaldi

- Author: Ann Rinaldi
- Language: English
- Series: Dear America
- Genre: Historical fiction
- Set in: Pennsylvania, U.S., 1880
- Publisher: Scholastic
- Publication date: April 1, 1999
- Publication place: United States
- Pages: 186
- ISBN: 0-590-14922-9

My Heart Is on the Ground: The Diary of Nannie Little Rose, a Sioux Girl, Carlisle Indian School, Pennsylvania, 1880 is a 1999 children's historical novel by Ann Rinaldi, part of the Dear America series of books. The novel takes the form of a diary belong to Nannie Little Rose, a Lakota girl sent to the Carlisle Indian Industrial School in Pennsylvania in 1880.

Although it received some positive reviews from critics, the novel has received criticism from academics and historians for its historical inaccuracy and portrayals of the Native American characters and culture and the Carlisle Indian School.

The novel was a runner up for the Wyoming Indian Paintbrush Award in 2001.

== Synopsis ==
Nannie Little Rose, a twelve-year-old Lakota girl who has been recruited to Carlisle Indian School, is given a diary by one of her teachers, Mrs. Campbell. She documents her first year of schooling at Carlisle in the diary, accompanied with reflections on the differences between Carlisle and home.

Nannie's friend, Lucy Pretty Eagle, later goes into a trance. She is buried, and Nannie is unsure whether her friend had actually died or whether she had been buried alive.

== Criticism ==
Following the book's release, a number of academics and historians, many of them Native American, published criticism of the book. Genevieve Bell, who had worked as the novel's fact checker, later released a statement of her own, reading in part: "I completely sympathize with the critical review of Rinaldi's work...There is much in the book that is offensive, and I did say so to Scholastic...I urged [Assistant editor] Melissa Jenkins to get a Lakota person to read it. She knew I was not Native American".

In a 2001 interview, Rinaldi said she stood by her book and attributed the mass of criticism to political correctness.

=== Historical inaccuracies ===
According to Dr. Debbie Reese, "factual errors abound here; they are on nearly every page". Some of these errors are listed below:

- Sichangu Lakota chief Spotted Tail is said to have moved his band in the pursuit of freedom, rather than to escape alcohol access (p. 12)
- Sitting Bull, a spiritual leader of the Hunkpapa Lakota, is mistakenly identified as "Chief Sitting Bull of Cheyenne nation" (p. 14)
- American Horse, cousin to Oglala leader Red Cloud, is mistakenly called a "chief of the Red Cloud Sioux" (p. 20)
- The Hunkpapa and Arapaho tribes are not described as opposing Custer (p. 50)
- Children were unlikely to speak their Native language openly at the school for fear of punishment (p. 69)
- The children take the forced cutting of their hair in a lighthearted manner (p. 71)
- When Spotted Tail visits his children at the school and takes them home, the children object to leaving, and there is "much screaming and crying" (p. 121). Historical accounts suggest that Spotted Tail's children were miserable at Carlisle and happy to leave the school.
- There are mentions of children having or loaning money at the school (p. 122); historically, money was never available to children there
- School founder Richard Henry Pratt is generally portrayed as a kind and sensitive man in the novel, although historical accounts characterize him as "a domineering man" who bullied "anyone who opposed his will...into submission".
- The historical note says that "most of the graduates were able to earn a living away from the reservation"; in reality, less than 10% of children graduated, and those who did worked at other residential schools or went "into Indian service".

=== Cultural authenticity ===
Debbie Reese argues the novel suffers from a "lack of cultural authenticity". For example, Reese suggests that children were aware of the power of words, and that Nannie's forthright discussion of her thoughts in her diary (including disparagement of teachers and white people at large) without fear of punishment by school authorities is unrealistic. Nannie is also portrayed as receiving education for the first time at the school, which ignores the traditional cultural education girls her age (and all children) would have already received at home.

Some other inaccuracies related to gender and ritual. Reese notes that Nannie refers to undertaking multiple male rites of passage (such as a vision quest), while the book doesn't acknowledge Lakota coming-of age ceremonies and teachings for girls. Reese also argues that Nannie's description of the Sun Dance is exoticized, and that a Lakota girl "would not likely think about talking to strangers about (or writing about) Sun Dance in any way, nor would she obsess over it or dream about it".

Some of the "lack of cultural authenticity" also relates to language. Reese points out that Nannie Little Rose would not have called herself Sioux, which is an exonym; she would have "referred to herself by her band (Sicangu) or location (Spotted Tail Agency) or from a much smaller familial group". There is also terminology used that a Lakota girl would not have used: "braves" in reference to Lakota men, the French term travois instead of an English or Lakota term, and "shaman" in reference to a Lakota spiritual leader.

Reese also argues that the novel ignores the values, familial ties, and reverence a Lakota girl of the time period would have had. She suggests that Nannie's criticism of her brother and mother and her mother's criticism of her are culturally inauthentic, and Nannie's comparison of the Devil to medicine men would have been unlikely for a Lakota girl of the era. Whiteshield's capture of a "tramp" on school grounds is presented as a brave act, while Reese notes that "for children who are raised to be generous above all things, it is highly unlikely that they would participate in capturing a poor homeless person". Lakota ideas of waste are also overlooked, as in a passage where Nannie suggests she and her friend should collect wildflowers to decorate tipis.

=== Stereotypes ===
In one diary entry, Nannie transcribes a speech by Red Cloud in "stilted language," while the actual speech used "flowing and eloquent words", even though Nannie can write in perfect English at this point in the novel.

Beyond cultural inaccuracies, Reese argues that Rinaldi employs Native American stereotypes in the novel, such as using compound words to "sound Native American" rather than using genuine Lakota vocabulary, as in the invented term for "interpreter", "Friend-To-Go-Between-Us," rather than the Lakota term "iyeska", and "night-middle-made" instead of the Lakota term for midnight, "hanco'kan". Reese writes that Rinaldi overuses "romantic-sounding metaphors" and that Nannie is overly obsessed with the ideas of bravery, honor, and nobility.

=== Appropriation ===
The book's title draws from a Cheyenne proverb, which can be translated as: "A nation is not conquered until the hearts of its women are on the ground. Then it is done, no matter how brave its warriors nor how strong their weapons". Dr. Debbie Reese argues that Nannie's use of the phrase "my heart is on the ground" throughout the book, often to refer to emotions or mood swings, trivializes the original meaning of the proverb, which refers to the "conquering of a nation, the death of a way of life".

Multiple characters in the book are named after children who died at the Carlisle School, which multiple critics felt was insensitive. Scholastic later released a statement noting that Louise Erdrich, author of The Birchbark House, had also derived a character name from historical documentation (in her case, a census). Later critics have suggested this comparison is not apt, as Erdrich's name was an Ojibwe word with "myriad naming associations" and the name was given to a character with a "new and separate identity".

One of the novel's characters, Lucy Pretty Eagle, is directly based on a real Rosebud Sioux girl who died at Carlisle in 1884. A ghost story involving her suggests she was buried alive while in a trance; this becomes a plot point in the book. Debbie Reese argues this choice is insensitive, and that it is made worse in the novel by Nannie not speaking up about Lucy being in a trance; "Here we have Indian children responsible for the death of Indian children...the white people had just made an 'honest mistake'".

Elizabeth Wilkinson argues that the novel appropriates material from Zitkala-Sa's 1921 book American Indian Stories. She points to the similarities in both Zitkala-Sa and Nannie being told they will have red apples and ride an iron horse if they go to the residential school. She also points to similar incidents in the two works, such as when both Zitkala-Sa and Nannie break a jar of turnips they are mashing; Zitkala-Sa felt satisfied at her rebellion, while Nannie feels guilty.
