= The Redheaded Princess =

2008 novel by Ann Rinaldi

- First edition cover
- Author: Ann Rinaldi
- Genre: Young adult historical fiction
- Publisher: HarperCollins
- Publication date: February 2008
- ISBN: 0-06-073374-8

The Redheaded Princess is a young adult historical fiction novel by American author Ann Rinaldi, published by HarperCollins in 2008.

== Plot ==
The book tells the story of the young Elizabeth I, from age nine until she becomes Queen of England in 1558, at the age of 25. Most of the novel takes place after the death of her father, Henry VIII, during the reign of her older sister, Mary I. The book dramatizes Elizabeth's flirtations with Thomas Seymour and her relationship with childhood friend and suitor Robert Dudley.

== Critical reception ==
In a starred review, Booklist's Anne O'Malley praised The Redheaded Princess's "rich scene-setting and believable, appealing heroine." Deborah Stevenson, writing for The Bulletin of the Center for Children's Books, claimed the novel contained some historical inaccuracies and underplayed biographical details such as Elizabeth's Protestantism.
