= Wolf by the Ears =

1991 novel by Ann Rinaldi

- First edition (publ. Scholastic)
- Author: Ann Rinaldi
- Language: English
- Publisher: Scholastic
- Publication date: 1991
- ISBN: 0-590-43413-6 (first edition)
- LC Class: PZ7.R459 Wo

Wolf by the Ears is a young adult novel by Ann Rinaldi, first published in 1991. It is about a young girl, Harriet Hemings, who is a slave belonging to Thomas Jefferson. She tries to decide if she will stay and be a slave or leave and take her freedom; the other issue for her to decide on is whether "passing" is an option (passing would mean that her skin is white enough that she could pretend to be white in society). Meanwhile, there are constant rumors about Thomas Jefferson being her father.

She deals with many obstacles along the way, including learning that, in the eyes of Jefferson, she is merely property. In the end she decides to pass as white (she is only 25% African-American) and live in the town nearby where she grew up.

Wolf by the Ears won the 1994 Senior Young Reader's Choice Award.

== Reception ==
Kirkus Reviews found that "The novel itself rambles and is repetitive; its style echoes the period, but not consistently" and "A valiant, earnest try, but not a successful one."
