= Temperance Wick =

American patriot

Coordinates: 40.7614°N 74.5425°W

- Born: October 30, 1758; Mendham, New Jersey, Colony of New Jersey
- Died: April 26, 1822 (aged 63); Morris County, New Jersey, United States
- Spouse: William Tuttle
- Parents: Henry Wick (father); Mary Cooper (mother)
- Relatives: Wick family

Temperance Wick (October 30, 1758 – April 26, 1822), also known as Tempe Wick and Tempe, was an American Revolutionary War heroine and the subject of many early American legends. She is traditionally regarded as an example of female patriotism in the early Republic, though many scholars and historians dispute the historical accuracy of the stories and traditions surrounding her life.

== Early life ==
Tempe Wick was born at Jockey Hollow in Morris County, New Jersey, the youngest of Henry Wick's five children. She was likely named after her paternal grandmother Temperance Barnes. The Wick family were one of the first and oldest English families in America. Her father, Henry Wick, was a grandson of the Pilgrim Father John Wick, and was the wealthiest and largest landowner in that part of New Jersey. Very little is known of her early life, but at the age of 21 she and her brother Henry Wick, Jr. were the last of the Wick children living at home with their elderly parents.

== Revolutionary War ==
Henry Wick was colonel of the Morris County Cavalry, which was responsible for protecting the New Jersey government and legislature.

The winter of 1779–1780 was known as the Hard Winter because of its unprecedented severity. The Continental Army, consisting of more than 10,000 soldiers, made camp on the Wick family's 1400-acre estate, Jockey Hollow, while General Arthur St. Clair and his staff rented quarters in the Wick House.

The community was obliged to provide food and other supplies to the encamped men, despite a poor harvest. The troops were poorly clothed and fed, and many went barefoot in the snow. An estimated 100 soldiers died in the camp hospital and were buried in the field north of the Wick House.

== The Pennsylvania Line Mutiny ==
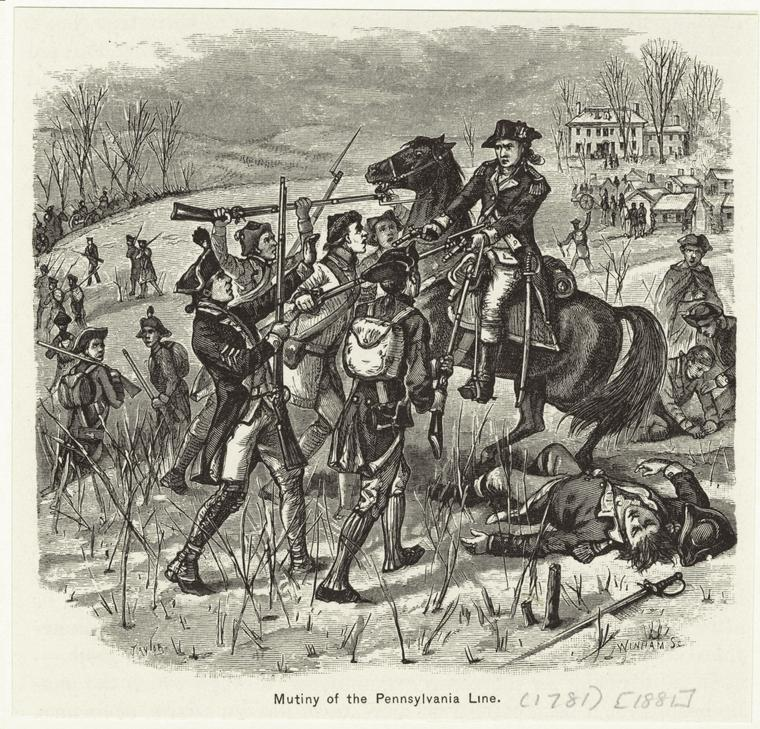
Pennsylvania Line Mutiny

Despite many requests and pleas to the Second Continental Congress, the soldiers wintering in Jockey Hollow had gone unpaid for over a year; more than a thousand of their number had already deserted. The issues came to a head in late December, when a group of mutinious Pennsylvania soldiers planned to march on Philadelphia in a show of force. They spent several weeks pillaging the countryside, taking horses and foods from every household they came across.

On December 21, 1780, Colonel Wick died, leaving Tempe alone to care for her sick mother Mary and her mentally ill brother Henry. When her mother's condition worsened, Tempe saddled her horse and rode for the home of local physician William Leddell, who lived about a mile away. The doctor was not present, so Tempe left a message at the Leddell residence and returned home.

Along the way, she was accosted by three mutineers. One grabbed the bridle of her horse, demanding that she give them her mount. Tempe feigned agreement and asked for the men to help her down; the second they let go of the bridle she whipped her horse and sped off down the road.

According to one version of the story, Tempe, knowing that the mutineers were pursuing her, led the horse into a bedroom. She closed the shutter over the window and put a feather bed under it to muffle the sound of its hooves. The soldiers arrived soon after and searched the outbuildings, barn, and woods around the house, but left empty-handed. Tempe supposedly kept the horse hidden in the bedroom until New Year's Day, when the mutineers marched south to Princeton, New Jersey.

In another version of the story, Tempe hid her horse in the kitchen. Claims are frequently made that a faint imprint of a horse's shoe can be seen in one of the bedrooms in the Wick House.

The Wick House at Jockey Hollow still stands, and is now a part of the Morristown National Historical Park. Visitors are allowed to see the bedroom where Tempe is said to have hidden her horse.

== Later life ==
After her mother Mary died on July 7, 1787, Tempe inherited Jockey Hollow, and married Dr. William Tuttle at the relatively late age of 30. Together they had five children.

== Historical accuracy ==
Scholars dispute the historical accuracy of her life and the traditions surrounding her role in the Pennsylvania Line Mutiny, but she and her parents are frequently mentioned in extant historical documents from the period, including letters, journals, and receipts.

== Depictions in literature ==
Tempe Wick is the main character in a short story written by the American story-teller Frank R. Stockton. His version emphasizes the patriotic virtues of American girls, using Tempe Wick as an example. However, most scholars agree that Stockton used very few sources when writing the story, and like most later writers and story-tellers who wrote about Tempe Wick, added many details of his own to the legend. Stockton's story is filled with exhortations to patriotism and courage: "When [Tempe] first began to canter over these hills and dales, it had been in times of peace, when there was nothing in this quiet country of which any one might be afraid; and now, although these were days of war, she felt no fear. There were soldiers not far away, but these she looked upon as her friends and protectors; for Washington and his army had encamped in that region to defend the country against the approach of the enemy."

Ann Rinaldi's historical fiction novel A Ride Into Morning centers on Tempe Wick and her family and is told from the perspective of Tempe's cousin Mary Cooper.

Howard Fast's historical novel The Proud and the Free (1950) tells the story of the Pennsylvania Line Mutiny from the enlisted man's perspective.

Patricia Lee Gauch's version of the story, "This Time, Tempe Wick?", is a popular children's book.

== See also ==
- Tempe Wick Road–Washington Corners Historic District
- New Jersey Brigade Encampment Site
- Jockey Hollow
