= A Break with Charity =

1992 novel by Ann Rinaldi

- First edition
- Author: Ann Rinaldi
- Language: English
- Series: Great Episodes
- Genre: Historical fiction
- Publisher: Harcourt
- Publication date: 15 September 1992
- Publication place: United States
- Media type: Print (hardback & paperback)
- Pages: 272 pp (1st HB)
- ISBN: 978-0-15-200353-1 (1st HB)
- OCLC: 25548979
- LC Class: PZ7.R459 Br 1993
- Preceded by: A Ride into Morning
- Followed by: The Fifth of March

A Break with Charity: A Story about the Salem Witch Trials is a children's novel by Ann Rinaldi released in 1992, and is part of the Great Episodes series. The protagonist is a fictionalized version of a real resident of Salem, who was an ancestor of Nathaniel Hawthorne.

== Plot synopsis ==
Susanna English, a teenage resident of Salem, Massachusetts in 1692, desperately wants to join an inner circle of girls who meet every night at the Reverend's house. The leader of the girls, Ann Putnam, tells Susanna that she plans to falsely accuse residents of their town of witchcraft. The elders of Salem believe Ann's accusations, and innocent members of the town are imprisoned. Ann threatens to name Susanna's parents as witches as well if Susanna reveals that the accusations are false. Susanna must choose between keeping quiet and breaking charity (that is, telling tales). Although she chooses to keep the girls' secret, they accuse Susanna's mother and father of being witches. Susanna then starts to believe in witches until the Reverend's son, Johnathon, gets her to meet an accused witch so she can see they are fake. She finally tells Joseph, Ann's uncle, what she knows, and together, they end any further witch trials. Fourteen years later she returns to hear Ann Putnam apologize for all the innocent people imprisoned or hanged.

== See also ==
- Salem witch trials
