= Finishing Becca =

- First edition (publ. Harcourt)
- Author: Ann Rinaldi
- Publisher: Houghton Mifflin Harcourt
- Publication date: January 1, 1994
- ISBN: 9780152008802

Finishing Becca: A Story about Peggy Shippen and Benedict Arnold is a 1994 historical fiction novel for young adults written by Ann Rinaldi. It takes place during the American Revolutionary War.

== Reception ==
Kirkus Reviews proclaimed, "This tale of treachery comes alive under [Rinaldi's] pen." They further remarked that she "takes her role as a historical novelist seriously, to which her long and informative endnote attests". In contrast, Booklist's Janice Del Negro noted that "the historical context is sometimes too obvious, and the word nigra, though a historically legitimate term, eventually becomes distracting".

However, Del Negro praised Rinaldi's character development, writing, "Rinaldi's evocation of the rip-roaring life and devil-be-damned personality of Peggy Shippen, which forms the real core of the story, makes you want to find out more about the people and the history--and that's certainly one of the goals of good historical fiction". School Library Journal's Ann W. Moore disagreed with this point, writing, "Given Becca's age and inexperience, her perceptiveness is unrealistic; her overwrought language is better suited to a Gothic romance." Moore also referred to Shippen and Arnold as "such unpleasant characters that nothing excuses Becca's enduring them for so long." Moore noted that in existing biographies aimed at an adult audience showcase these character's "complex personalities", but in this novel, "she's spoiled and manipulative and he's merely a selfish egotist". Moore concluded that "this one-track approach not only does these individuals a disservice, but it also becomes tedious to read".

Moore had further critiques specifically related to the novel's use of first-person. The first issue Moore explores is that "Rinaldi continually relies on the fortuitous overhearing of conversations, chance meetings, and convenient letters to develop her plot". As such, "too much history is crammed into dialogue, and too much confiding in animals occurs to update readers". Moore's second issue is that "the author relies on talk, thought, and feelings at the expense of action. Consequently, the story drags."
