= The Proud and the Free =

1950 historical novel by Howard Fast

- First US edition (publ. Little, Brown); Cover art by Martha Sawyers
- Author: Howard Fast
- Language: English
- Publisher: Little, Brown and Company
- Publication date: 1950
- OCLC: 987462
- LC Class: PZ3.F265 Pr

The Proud and the Free is a 1950 historical novel by Howard Fast. It tells the story of the Pennsylvania Line Mutiny from the enlisted men's point of view.

== Pennsylvania Line Mutiny ==
The mutiny began on January 1, 1781, and ended with a negotiated settlement on January 8, 1781, with final terms concluded by January 29, 1781. The mutiny was the most successful and important insurrection of Continental Army soldiers during the American Revolutionary War.

The Proud and the Free is Fast's novelization of the event, published September 8, 1950. A member of the Communist Party USA, and recently released from a short prison sentence, Fast received mixed reviews from leftist publications. The Daily Worker reviewed it favorably, whereas the Masses and Mainstream gave it a critical review.

== Novel ==
The narrative is told by Jamie Stuart, an elderly man who, at that time, was a 22-year-old orphaned son of indentured servants from York, Pennsylvania. He was a member of the Foreign Brigade of Pennsylvania which consisted of mostly immigrants but also has some native-born Americans in its ranks.

The enlisted men live in slum-like housing near Morristown, New Jersey. They have very little food, clothing or money. The officers, led by the Continental Army's General Anthony Wayne, aka Mad Anthony Wayne, in contrast live in comfortable housing, have gourmet-quality food, fine wine, and well-tailored clothes.

The novel describes how a wide range of men, not just the dominant Protestants but also Jews, Blacks, Irish, atheists, and Romans, i.e., Roman Catholics, who normally would not find it easy to get along, formed a cohesive unit with their officers, the gentry, and especially the British as their common enemy.

The novel depicts most officers as excessively strict and uncaring. One incident too many triggers the soldiers' decision to revolt. One man cites the Declaration of Independence's guidance, "That whenever any Form of Government becomes destructive of these ends (Life, Liberty and the pursuit of Happiness), it is the Right of the People to alter or to abolish it and to institute new Government."

Led by a Committee of Sergeants, the brigades, via surprise and organization, present a fait accompli to their officers who are powerless to stop them. The men follow military procedures to form as a new, free fighting force. On the way to Princeton, New Jersey, folks along the countryside feed and cheer the men on.

The soldiers agree to return to General Wayne's army as long as (1) there is no direct reprisal against any soldier, (2) that those due a bounty be paid, and (3) those whose three-year terms of enlistment had expired are discharged but may reenlist.

Stuart, who enlisted when he was 17, departs for Philadelphia and then York, Pa. to return to the girl he left behind, Molly Bracken. Restless, Stuart rejoins the brigade which is headed to Virginia to participate in one of the last battles of the Revolutionary War.
