= Or Give Me Death =

2003 work of fiction by Ann Rinaldi

- First edition
- Author: Ann Rinaldi
- Cover artist: Claudine G. Mansour
- Language: English
- Genre: Historical Fiction
- Publisher: Harcourt
- Publication date: July 2003
- Publication place: United States
- Media type: Print (Paperback)
- Pages: 226
- ISBN: 0-15-216687-4

Or Give Me Death (ISBN 0-15-216687-4) is a 2003 work of historical fiction by Ann Rinaldi based on the possibility that the famous words of Patrick Henry's "Give me Liberty or Give me Death!" speech may have been first spoken by his dying, mentally ill wife, Sarah, whom he kept locked up in a cellar to prevent her from hurting anyone. The story is told through the eyes of his daughter, Patsy Henry. It is also told by his younger daughter, Anne Henry. Patrick Henry travels throughout the Thirteen Colonies, advocating independence from Britain.

As the mother of a large family and wife of Patrick Henry succumbs to a genetic mental disorder, she is removed to a cellar prison in her own house, where she shows the power to predict future outcomes. Her family is left to cope with her absence, even as they are threatened to be torn apart by the knowledge that their middle child may have inherited their mother's disease.

== Summary ==
Everything in the Patrick Henry household is fine until Sarah Henry, the mother, begins to lose her mind. This results in her confinement in the cellar to prevent any danger that she could pose. This leaves Patsy to become the head of the house with her father gone persuading the Americans to rebel against Britain. As Sarah begins to lose her mind, she also gains the ability to supposedly see the future. Rumors spread about a madwoman locked in a cellar in the town, and Patsy does her best to conceal it from the public. However, she is eventually forced to tell her siblings when things get out of order in the household. One day when Anne sneaks down to visit her mother, she is told by her mother that she would learn who would inherit the bad blood next time she goes down. Before she is able to go down, Patsy finds out her sister has been visiting her mother secretly. Because Anne tells her that her mother would tell her who would inherit the bad blood, Patsy allows her to visit her mother again. When told, Anne decides to lie about who gets it and claims that she inherited it. In truth, her brother, John, inherits the bad blood, but Anne tries to save her brother in hopes that he won't have to put up with the harsh treatment Patsy puts all her siblings. When Patsy learns, she becomes harsher on Anne to prevent her from inheriting it.

After some years pass, Anne continuously lies and keeps secrets, thinking it would be for the best. This begins to break when her father weds John's lover, Dorothea Dandridge, while John is off fighting in the war. Dorothea Dandridge says that her relationship with John was just fun and not serious. Anne is forced to write to John and when he reads the letter, it triggers the bad blood that he inherited from his mother. At the end of the book, Anne tells her father who really has the bad blood and wonders if keeping all the secrets was really the right thing to do.

== Characters ==
=== Henry Family ===
==== Patrick ====
Patrick Henry is a wealthy and well-known man who supports the American patriot cause for independence from Britain, their mother country. Being well-known man and a supporter for independence, he is led away from his family often. This is believed to be one reason why his wife goes insane. He uses the phrase, "Give me Liberty or Give me Death!" which he took from his wife when she asked for freedom. Supposedly, his wife has the gift of the sight and predicts his death. After her wife dies, he mourns for two weeks and goes back out to speak in order to help win the war. When John goes off to war, he becomes close to Dorothea Dandridge. Unknowingly, Pa marries John's love. Soon after marrying her, he becomes governor. When he learns that John loved his wife well before he did, he writes a letter to John letting him know of the wedding. However, John never opens it because he reads Anne's first. The thought of his loved one marrying his father causes him to start losing his mind as well.

==== Sarah ====
Sarah, a woman with an aristocratic background descended from Alfred the Great, is Patrick Henry's wife and a mother of 6. Before she loses her mind, she is a respectable wife and mother. She follows the rules that all women in her time period followed. This included never admitting her love for her husband because "it was not consistent with the perfection of female delicacy" (65) which she learned in the book The Ladies Library. This included being delicate and motherly as well as dressing modestly. However, she starts losing herself and is said to have the sight. She tells of the deaths and future which all come true. Towards the end of her life, she tells her husband "Oh, Patrick, give me my freedom or let me die!". Anne hears her mother say those very words and her father mimic them in a speech after her death.

==== Patsy ====
Patsy is the oldest of the 6 children at 16 years old and is in a relationship with MyJohn. She is the typical girl in her time. Like an obedient lady, she sews and shows proper behavior. However, she often scolds her siblings, especially Anne, when they don't follow her rules. When Mama, Sarah, goes insane, Patsy becomes the head of the household. She controls the house when her father is away and takes the role her mother once had. She has a short temper and doesn't trust the slaves, especially Pegg. As the slaves become more bold, she believes that they are trying to poison her, so she forces Pegg to take a sip before serving to the family. While she breaks the rule of wearing silk in the house and drinking tea, she also thinks that she deserves full command of the house while her father is out. She is often portrayed as hard-headed and demanding.

==== John ====
John is 15 and the second oldest of the 6. He inherits his mother's bad blood. However, this is not revealed until the very end of the book. His sister, Anne, protects him from the wrath of Patsy and claims that she has inherited the bad blood. John secretly sees Dorothea Dandridge, knowing that his father would disapprove of such a marriage. Later on in the novel, he goes off to fight in the Revolutionary War and Pa and Dorothea become close. Eventually, they get married and Anne is told to write a letter to John telling him of the wedding.

==== William ====
William is eight at the start of the book and the third oldest.

==== Anne ====
Anne is seven at the start of the book and the fourth oldest in the family. Her stubborn attitude, free spirit, and love for riding horses causes her to get in trouble with her older sister, Patsy. As a form of rebellion against Patsy's ruling and spreading word about the cruel and unjust treatments Estave put his slave through, she starts writing articles with a fake name, Intrepid. However, she is stopped when Patsy finds out about her actions. In the second half of the book, we are told the story through her eyes. At a young age, she is told many secrets and has to keep them, thinking that it was for the best. She, too, is called dead by her mother, and the thought bothers her constantly. In the end, she questions whether keeping all those secrets was really worth the price.

==== Betsy ====
Betsy is the second to youngest and is two at the start of the book. As a child, she mainly raised without her mother. Under the strict eye of Patsy, she becomes the ideal girl of her time and is able to mind her own business. She is seen as the opposite of Anne due to her obedience that Anne often lacks with Patsy. Anne tries to break how Patsy raises Betsy up by playing games. However, Betsy often only cracks a smile at the most.

==== Edward ====
Edward is the baby in the family and is the only one who escapes from Patsy's strict wrath. The book opens up with Edward getting dumped into cold water by Mama. Because his mother goes crazy, he is fed by a slave against the will of Mama.

=== Other notable characters ===
==== MyJohn ====
MyJohn is Patsy's boyfriend and husband later on in the novel. He is well-liked by everyone, especially Anne. Unlike Patsy, he is kind and gentle but still able to keep things under control. He is one of the only people Patsy listens aside from her father. MyJohn has a great influence in the Henry family being Patsy's husband and with Patrick Henry gone fighting for independence through speeches, he manages a lot of what goes on as well and works hard on the plantation.

==== Pegg ====
Pegg is the main slave in the household and is the seventh daughter of a seventh daughter. While disliked by Patsy, Pegg and Anne get along well. She is more gentle with the children and earns some authority with the children when Patsy realizes she can't handle it by herself. Pegg is related to Neely which leads Mrs. Hooper to the assumption that the Henrys' slaves were writing letters in the newspaper. Neely is let into the house secretly by Pegg without Patsy knowing. She goes with Neely to try to gain freedom from Neely's master, Estave, and possibly escape as well. Anne keeps it a secret and Pegg's daughter helps with cooking while Pegg is out. However, Patsy is told that Pegg is sulking in her room because Patsy accused her of wanting to poison her. Anne and Pegg's daughter grows closer while Pegg is gone and awaits the news. In the end, Pegg comes back and Neely is beaten to death by her master.

==== Spencer Roane ====
Spencer Roane befriends Anne. He talks to Anne about things she actually is interested in such as horses. Anne fancies Spencer because he doesn't treat her like a delicate child.

==== Mrs. Hooper ====
Mrs. Hooper is a critical and strict woman, but carries herself like women were supposed to in her time. She blames the Henry family's slaves for writing letters in the newspaper that Anne writes with a fake name, causing Anne to stop writing letters that address the harsh treatment that the slaver girl, Neely, was put through.

==== Sarah Hallam and Jonathan Snead ====
Sarah Hallam and Jonathan Snead run away from home and try to find someone who will marry them. However, Sarah's aunt, Mrs. Hooper, tells everyone through the Gazette not to marry them. Anne and William meet them on the way back from the Hoopers' dancing school. When Patrick comes home, he asks Reverend Henry, his uncle, to marry the two officially. They marry in the house of Patrick Henry.

==== Clementina ====
Clementina is a friend of Patsy's, a wife, and eventually a widow in debt. She listens and can be viewed as a shoulder to lean on when Patsy's family problems are talked about. Her future is also predicted by Patsy's mother and is told that her husband would die and leave her in debt. Like all Patsy's mother's predictions, it comes true. She dies from working too hard trying to pay off the debts her husband left behind when he died.

== Settings ==
The book takes place in the middle of the American Revolution (1775-1783) in Virginia. For the majority of the book, it occurs in the household of Patrick Henry.

== Conflict ==
Throughout the novel, there are many conflicts. In the beginning of the novel, the main conflict is the fact that their mother goes crazy and becomes unable to care for the family. This leaves a gap in the family, especially with their father gone the majority of the time. Patsy and her siblings are forced to cope with life without their mother, many at a very young age. This conflict starts out the whole novel. The other conflicts that follow include Patsy's harsh reign and how their siblings have to live under her ruling as well as Anne's internal conflict of keeping secrets. As the book progresses, she is given more secrets to keep, each adding a weight on her shoulder. In the end, she spills the greatest secret of all, the sibling with the bad blood.

== Community reviews ==
This book was met with mixed reviews in the community. Some found it intriguing and hard to put down. In addition, they enjoyed how Ann Rinaldi showed two perspectives in the novel.

"This was a great Ann Rinaldi book, told by the daughters of Patrick Henry. Unlike other books that take place at a house instead of war, it is a gripping story that will leave you questioning Patrick Henry and his family. Patsy is the first narrator, and she describes how the family must find a way to conceal their own mother as her mind starts to slip away. Definitely worth reading!" -Erin Mutchek

"This book changed my life when my teacher read it to us in fifth grade. I've seen a lot of complaints about how the book was told with two different narrators. But that was made me think. Until then, I'd always thought there was only one right perspective in a situation. If you get in a fight, somebody has to be wrong. As soon as Anne's part started, I asked myself over and over again, "Which sister is right?" Is Patsy an overworked, long-sufferer plagued by bratty, butterfly-biting Anne? Or is Anne a lonely, sacrificing, misunderstood girl buried by secrets, subjected to tyrannical Patsy? Or Give Me Death taught me that it was possible for two conflicting forces to BOTH be right." -Erica

However, others didn't find the book appealing. Many of those that didn't enjoy the book didn't like one part of the narration or found it to be one of their least favorite of all her books written.

"This book was pretty good. It had a good topic and a good plot. The first half was narrated by Patsy, Patrick Henry's eldest daughter. That was fine. I liked her character, and her personality coupled with the events she was dealing with made it easy to sympathize with her. But the 2nd half killed this book for me. Anne, another daughter was narrating, and her character was annoying, whiny, and didn't have respect for what other members of the house were going through. It left a bad taste in my mouth." -Kristen

"...I would have liked to see more of the outside world and the colonial world leak into the house, but rather as a reader I was trapped inside the madness and lies of the Henry household. This was a drama more than a historical fiction. I give it 2 stars because I do love Rinaldi and have loved all her other novels. However this one just happened to fall short of the ball park. On a final note it is important to mention that Rinaldi fleshes out the end of her novel with a short conclusion where she reasons out all the events within her book. THIS BOOK IS FICTION. That is all the epilogue proves. All of the lines that Rinaldi draws between the story that she has created and the actual world are whimsy and nothing else. Everything is a bit of a stretch ( especially the part where Rinaldi tries to reason that Henry Patrick stole the most famous part of his "give me liberty or give me death" speech from his own wives mouth)." -Constance

== Editorial reviews ==
The overall reviews were positive, including from the School Library Journal and Publishers Weekly.

"Fascinating . . . An intriguing blend of historical fact and fiction." -School Library Journal

"Told from the double perspective of two of Patrick Henry's daughters, this is the compelling story of a family's personal tragedy during the American Revolution. With the country in political turmoil, the father is away from home leaving the children to deal with their mother's downward spiral into madness. Sixteen-year-old Patsy begins the story, "I was the first in the family to know when Mama started to go insane." She holds the burden of an oldest child and rules her younger siblings with too much force. From another perspective, nine-year-old Anne protects her mother who has been confined to the cellar in a strait dress. Anne is torn between telling the truth and protecting someone she loves. She is also hiding the identity of the sibling who may inherit this same disease. The concepts of mental illness and familial tension have been provocatively detailed in this engrossing piece of historical fiction. An author's note and a bibliography are included in a book that will surely provide food for thought." -Laura Hummel (Children's Literature)

"Gripping." -Publishers Weekly

== Bibliography ==
- Rinaldi, Ann (2003). Or Give Me Death. Harcourt. ISBN 0-15-216687-4.
