= Girl in Blue =

2001 novel by Ann Rinaldi

- First edition (publ. Scholastic)
- Author: Ann Rinaldi
- Language: English
- Publication date: 2001

Girl in Blue is a 2001 novel by Ann Rinaldi. It is a historical fiction that takes place during 1861, during the American Civil War.

== Plot ==
16-year-old Sarah Louisa Wheelock lives on a farm near a small village in Michigan in the 1860s. Her abusive father wants her to marry an abusive neighbor who has several children. Instead, she runs away to Flint, Michigan to stay with an aunt, and then ships out with the First Union Greys to fight in the Civil War as a man. She ends up working in a hospital as a gopher. She fights in the first Bull Run. After she is discovered to be a girl, she continues to work for the Union-spying on Rose O'Neal Greenhow.

== Reception ==
This novel takes many of its plot points from the life of Sarah Emma Edmonds.
