= A Ride into Morning =

1991 novel by Ann Rinaldi

- First edition
- Author: Ann Rinaldi
- Language: English
- Series: Great Episodes
- Genre: Historical
- Publisher: Harcourt Books
- Publication date: 1991
- Publication place: United States
- Media type: Print (paperback)
- Pages: 368 pp
- ISBN: 0-15-204683-6
- OCLC: 50417272
- LC Class: PZ7.R459 Ri 2003
- Followed by: A Break with Charity

A Ride into Morning is a historical novel by Ann Rinaldi about the legend surrounding Tempe Wick, one of America's most famous heroines. It is part of the Great Episodes series. It is told in first-person narration.

== Summary ==
In the midst of the American Revolution, fourteen-year-old Mary Cooper moves in with her twenty-two-year-old cousin, Tempe Wick, and Tempe's elderly mother, Mary Wick, after Mary's Tory family discovered that she was participating in the Patriot cause. Her brother, Abraham is also a Patriot soldier. Mary's cousin lives near where the American soldiers have camped for the winter. Two of Mary's young friends, David Hamilton Morris and Jeremiah Levering, are stationed here too. Mary has fallen in love with General Anthony Wayne.

The Patriot soldiers and all those who live on farms near the magazine are now facing an incredibly cold winter. A mutiny is imminent. Tempe befriends Billy Bowzar, a Patriot soldier and probably leader of the mutiny. Tempe lends Bowzar her beloved white horse. Mary learns of Bowzar's plans and discovers that Tempe is growing hesitant as well. The cousins stop fighting so they can keep Aunt Mary safe, a plan that involves keeping Tempe's horse, Colonel, in the house overnight.
