= The Staircase (novel) =

2000 novel by Ann Rinaldi

- First edition
- Author: Ann Rinaldi
- Language: English
- Genre: Historical fiction
- Publisher: Harcourt
- Publication date: 2000

The Staircase is a 2000 historical fiction novel by Ann Rinaldi.

== Background ==
The book is about the spiral staircase at the Loretto Chapel in Santa Fe, New Mexico, rumored to have miraculous origins. It was adapted into the 1998 television movie The Staircase starring William Petersen (as Joad), Barbara Hershey (as Mother Madalyn), and Diane Ladd (as Sister Margaret).

== Plot summary ==
13-year-old Lizzy Enders's father dumps her at a Santa Fe convent after her mother died on the Santa Fe Trail. The school is run by the Sisters of Loretto, and as a Methodist, Lizzy cannot comprehend their dedication to Catholicism and is bothered by what she sees as hypocrisy. She thinks the nuns who pray to Saint Joseph for help to finish their choir loft (which does not have a staircase) are crazy. Lizzy becomes an outsider among her class. Her roommate, Elinora, is cruel; in one incident, Lizzy gets a kitten, and Elinora stabs its eyes with an embroidery needle.

Lizzy befriends an unemployed carpenter, Jose, and suggests he build the staircase. Her classmates are furious, as they believe his presence will prevent Saint Joseph from providing the staircase through a miracle. But Jose builds the staircase in a matter of weeks, armed with three simple tools and his faith. After building the staircase, Jose disappears. Lizzy's kitten regains its sight, and she reconciles with Elinora. She ultimately decides to leave the convent to live with her father, who is living on a ranch in Texas.

== Critical reception ==
The book received mostly positive reviews. The Booklist wrote that "once again, Rinaldi plays expertly to her audience." Publishers Weekly praised the novel overall but called the relationship between Lizzy and Elinora "reductive." Kirkus Reviews also praised the book.
