= The Coffin Quilt =

2002 novel by Ann Rinaldi

Coffin Quilt
- First edition
- Author: Ann Rinaldi
- Language: English
- Series: Great Episodes Series
- Genre: Historical
- Publisher: Harcourt Children's Books
- Publication date: October 1999
- Publication place: United States
- Pages: 228 pgs.

The Coffin Quilt is a novel by Ann Rinaldi that was first published in 2002. Set in Kentucky and West Virginia, it tells the story of the Hatfield–McCoy feud in the late 19th century through the eyes of Fanny, a young female member of the McCoy family. Choosing between family and what is right is one of the major decisions Fanny McCoy has to make. When the McCoys decide to wage a war against a rival family, the Hatfields, things start to get out of hand; four of her brothers are killed by Hatfields.

== Plot ==
Rinaldi tells the story of the Hatfield-McCoy feud in the late 19th century through the eyes of Fanny, a young female member of the McCoy clan. Set against the backdrop of the Civil War, Rinaldi illustrates the fervent code of honor in the mountains of Kentucky and West Virginia as her protagonist struggles to understand the superstition and loyalty fueling the cycle of violence in Tug Valley. In the end, Fanny must choose between her family and her future to escape the feud.

When Fanny's sister, Roseanna, the “purtiest girl in the county,” has an affair with Johnse Hatfield, the slow brewing hatred between the Hatfield and the McCoys erupts. As the families take the law into their own hands through dubious pacts and midnight raids, Fanny follows her sister Roseanna into a nest of secrets. Pregnant and estranged from her lover, Roseanna sews a coffin quilt to preserve the family members so quickly disappearing from Tug Valley. Fanny disapproves of the quilt despite her loyalty to her sister and evolves from an innocent bystander to a judicious dissenter as the violence escalates. With the help of her mysterious “Yeller Thing,” Fanny learns to overcome the petty hatred plaguing both families.

== Author ==
According to the author's website, young adult author Ann Rinaldi uses her writing to excite readers about the American experience. Her books have been noted for their ability to augment girls’ interest in history.
