= Jockey Hollow =

Historic house in New Jersey, United States

- U.S. Historic district – Contributing property
- New Jersey Register of Historic Places
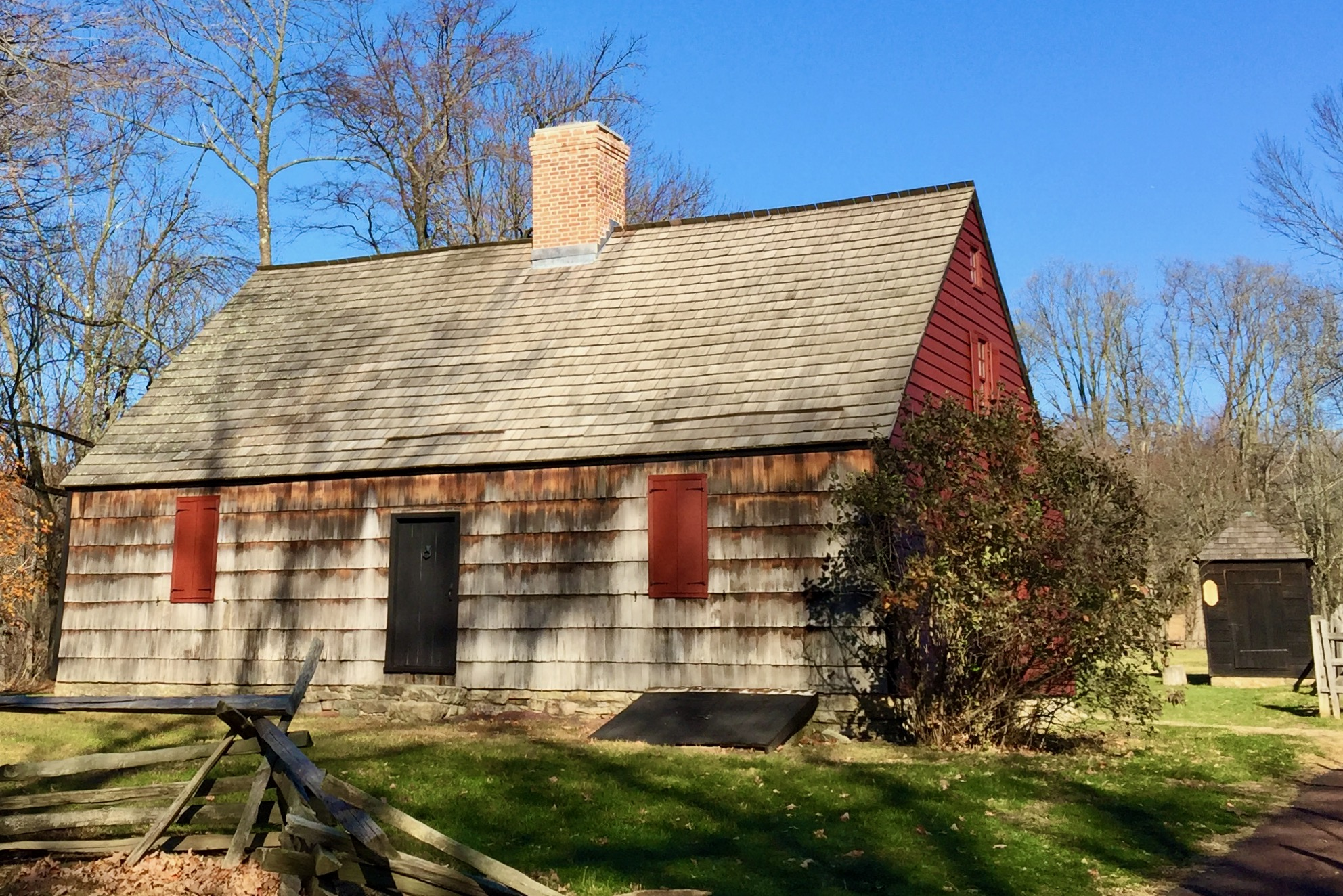
- Wick House at Jockey Hollow in 2016

- Location within Morris County, New Jersey Location within New Jersey Location within the United States
- Coordinates: 40°45′41″N 74°32′33″W
- Area: 1,307.49 acres (5.2912 km^{2})
- Part of: Morristown National Historical Park (ID66000053)
- NJRHP No.: 3381

Significant dates
- Designated CP: October 15, 2000
- Designated NJRHP: May 27, 1971

Jockey Hollow is the name of an area in southern Morris County, New Jersey, which was farmed in the 18th century by the Wick, Guerin, and Kemble families.

The origin of the name is still uncertain, but it was a farming property during the American Revolution. For most of the American Revolutionary War, it was used by portions of Continental Army as a winter camp site, and it housed the main Continental Army during the "Hard Winter" of 1779–80, believed to be the harshest winter in recorded history.

It is located in Harding Township and Mendham Township, in Morris County.

Since 1933, the Wick House has been part of Morristown National Historical Park in Morristown, New Jersey. Morristown National Historical Park is administered by the National Park Service, U.S. Department of the Interior.

== American Revolutionary War ==
During the Revolutionary War, Henry Wick possessed the largest portion of this area—his farm comprised 1400 acres of timber and open field. The Wick farm and his neighbors' property were considered the ideal location for a winter camp due to the distance from British forces in New York and the amount of timber needed for shelter and firewood for a large army, and the availability of houses for officers, mainly generals and their staff, to quarter.

During the winter of 1779–1780, approximately 600 acres of timber in Wick land and about 2000 acres total in Jockey Hollow were cut down by the soldiers to be used for the construction of huts and as firewood.

== The Wick House ==
In the spring of 1777, the Wick family hosted Captain Joseph Bloomfield.

During the Winter of 1779–1780, the Wicks housed General Arthur St. Clair, who was then commander of the Pennsylvania Line, and several of his aides.

The house is now restored and is one of the historic structures maintained and open for viewing at the Morristown National Historical Park.

== Wick Kitchen Garden ==
A kitchen garden next to the Wick House is maintained by the Northern New Jersey unit of Herb Society of America.

== The "Hard Winter" at Jockey Hollow ==
During the Winter of 1779–1780, the Wicks housed General Arthur St. Clair, who was then commander of the Pennsylvania Line, and several of his aides.

In December 1779, over 10.000 Continental Army troops encamped for the winter at Jockey Hollow. Soldiers camped at this location until June 1780, during which time they endured some of the harshest conditions of the war. Due to the bad conditions of the dirt roads in the winter and spring, dependence on horsepower, distance from the enemy in New York plus the natural walls of protection provided by the present-day Watchung Mountains, this was a secure area to camp the army.

The Winter at Jockey Hollow was the worst winter of the war, even worse than the Winter at Valley Forge two years before. Twelve men often shared one of over one thousand simple huts built in Jockey Hollow to house the Army. Amazingly, despite the difficult conditions and lack of food, fewer than 100 soldiers died and only one out of ten deserted.

== Soldier housing ==
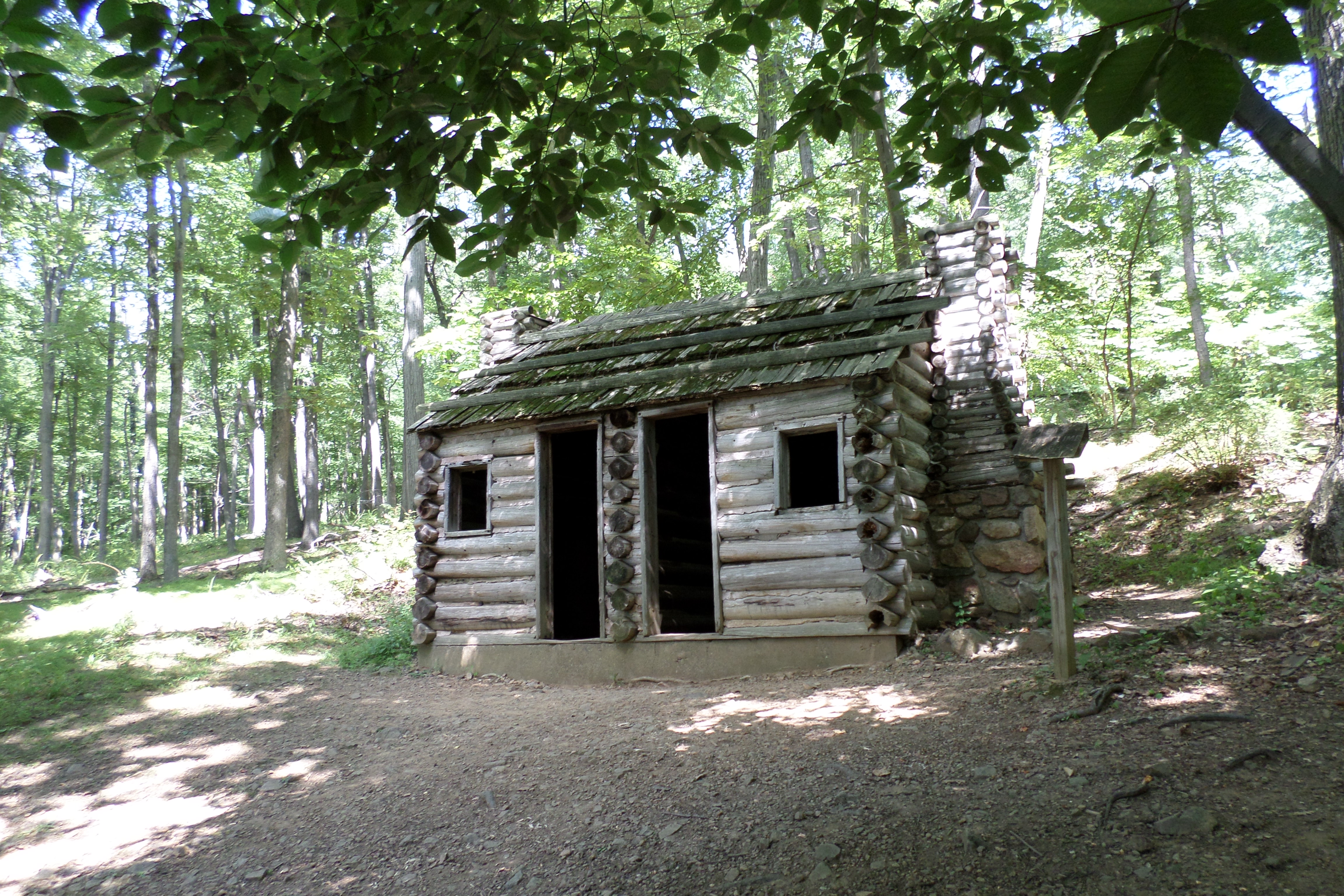
Reconstructed hut at Jockey Hollow (July 2015)

Soldiers had to build their own huts including surrounding trenches for drainage. The huts, made of log, were 14 by 16 feet (4.3 by 4.9 m) and 6.5 feet (2.0 m) high. Twelve men often shared one of over one thousand simple huts built in Jockey Hollow to house the army. Inside the huts soldiers had a fireplace for warmth and cooking. To create a floor they packed the ground for an earthen floor. Soldiers also had to make their own furniture, including bunks and tables. Their bunks got covered with straw and each soldier was to be given one blanket, although Washington claimed that a quarter of the men "did not have the shadow of a blanket." . Soldiers huts were about 2 to 3 ft (50–100 cm) apart, with three rows of eight huts for each regiment. By 1780, soldiers had built about 1,200 huts in Jockey Hollow.

There are four replica huts on Sugar Loaf hill built in 1964.

There is a 1932 marker to the "Jockey Hollow Hospital" just across the road from those replica huts—subsequent archeology done after Morristown National Historical Park was established found no evidence of graves there.

== Pennsylvania Line mutiny of 1781 ==
On December 21, 1780, Henry Wick died at Jockey Hollow. On the evening of January 1781, the Pennsylvania Line, then encamped in Jockey Hollow under the command of General Anthony Wayne mutinied. They supposedly intended to march to Philadelphia to complain to the state legislature. Many soldiers believed their enlistments in the army had expired with the new year, but the army claimed that their enlistment terms "two years or during the war" meant the end of the war was their true duration. The mutineers reached Princeton, New Jersey, where Pennsylvania's chief executive Joseph Reed and representatives of the Supreme Executive Council of Pennsylvania negotiated with them. The mutiny ended peacefully—some of the soldiers agreed to stay in the army. The event is believed to be the largest mutiny in the course of the American Revolutionary War.

The most famous account of this mutiny is Carl Van Doren's book, Mutiny in January, published in 1943.

== Facilities ==
- Jockey Hollow Visitor Center
- Wick House: Park employee in period dress.

== Activities ==
- Biking (road only)
- Bird Watching
- Hiking
- Interpretive Programs
- Snow Skiing
- Children's Junior Ranger Program

== See also ==
- New Jersey Brigade Encampment Site - Used by the New Jersey Brigade during the same winter encampment
- Temperance Wick
- William W. Wick
- Hilton Wick
- Valley Forge
- Craig House
- Washington Rock State Park
