= Ann Rinaldi =

American author (1934–2021)

- Born: August 27, 1934; New York City, U.S.
- Died: July 1, 2021 (aged 86); Branchburg, New Jersey, U.S.
- Writing career
- Genre: Young adult fiction

Ann Rinaldi (August 27, 1934 – July 1, 2021) was an American journalist and young adult fiction author. She was best known for her historical fiction, including In My Father's House, The Last Silk Dress, An Acquaintance with Darkness, A Break with Charity, Numbering All The Bones and Hang a Thousand Trees with Ribbons. She wrote more than forty novels (54 to be exact), eight of which were listed as notable by the ALA. In 2000, Wolf by the Ears was listed as one of the best young adult novels of the preceding twenty-five years, and later of the last one hundred years. She also wrote for the Dear America series.

Her career, prior to being an author, was a newspaper columnist. She continued the column, called "The Trentonian", through much of her writing career. Her first published novel, Term Paper, was written in 1979.

== Publications ==
=== Books ===
- A Ride into Morning: The Story of Tempe Wick (1991)
- A Break with Charity: A Story About the Salem Witch Trials (1992)
- The Fifth of March: A Story of the Boston Massacre (1993)
- Finishing Becca: A Story about Peggy Shippen and Benedict Arnold (1994)
- The Secret of Sarah Revere (1995)
- Hang a Thousand Trees with Ribbons: The Story of Phillis Wheatley (1996)
- An Acquaintance with Darkness (1997)
- Cast Two Shadows: The American Revolution in the South (1998)
- The Coffin Quilt: The Feud between the Hatfields and the McCoys (1999)
- Amelia's War (1999), ISBN 0-590-11744-0
- The Staircase (2000)
- Girl in Blue (2001), ISBN 0-439-07336-7
- Numbering All the Bones (2002)
- Or Give Me Death: A Novel of Patrick Henry's Family (2003), ISBN 0-15-216687-4
- An Unlikely Friendship: A Novel of Mary Todd Lincoln and Elizabeth Keckley (2007), ISBN 0-15-205597-5
- Come Juneteenth (2007), ISBN 0-15-205947-4
- The Ever-After Bird (2007), ISBN 0-15-202620-7
- The Letter Writer (2008), ISBN 9780152064020
- Juliet's Moon (2010), ISBN 9780547258744

=== Dear America ===
- My Heart Is on the Ground: The Diary of Nannie Little Rose, a Sioux Girl (1999), ISBN 0-590-14922-9
- The Journal of Jasper Jonathan Pierce, a Pilgrim Boy (2000), ISBN 0-590-51078-9

=== Quilt Trilogy ===
- A Stitch in Time (1994), ISBN 0-590-46056-0
- Broken Days (1995), ISBN 0-590-46054-4
- The Blue Door (1999), ISBN 0-590-46052-8

=== Others ===
- Term Paper (1980), ISBN 0-8027-6395-2
- Promises Are for Keeping (1982), ISBN 0-8027-6442-8
- But in the Fall I'm Leaving (1985), ISBN 0-8234-0560-5
- Time Enough for Drums (1986), ISBN 0-8234-0603-2
- The Good Side of My Heart (1987), ISBN 0-8234-0648-2
- The Last Silk Dress (1988), ISBN 0-8234-0690-3
- Wolf by the Ears (1991), ISBN 0-590-43413-6
- In My Father's House (1992), ISBN 0-590-44730-0
- The Second Bend in the River (1997), ISBN 0-590-74258-2
- Mine Eyes Have Seen (1997), ISBN 0-590-54318-0
- The Education of Mary: A Little Miss of Color, 1832 (2000), ISBN 0-7868-0532-3
- Millicent's Gift (2002), ISBN 0-06-029636-4
- Taking Liberty: The Story of Oney Judge, George Washington's Runaway Slave (2002), ISBN 0-689-85187-1
- Numbering All the Bones (2002), ISBN 0-7868-0533-1
- Sarah's Ground (2004), ISBN 0-689-85924-4
- Mutiny's Daughter (2004), ISBN 0-06-029638-0
- Nine Days a Queen: The Short Life and Reign of Lady Jane Grey (2005), ISBN 0-06-054923-8
- Brooklyn Rose (2005), ISBN 0-15-205117-1
- The Color of Fire (2005), ISBN 0-7868-0938-8
- The Redheaded Princess (2008), ISBN 0-06-073374-8
- My Vicksburg (2009), ISBN 9780152066246
- The Family Greene (2010), ISBN 9780547260679
- The Last Full Measure. Harcourt. 2010. ISBN 9780547389806. OCLC 501491732.
- Leigh Ann's Civil War. Graphia. 2011. ISBN 9780547549996. OCLC 651912096.
- My Vicksburg. Paw Prints. 2011. ISBN 9781451728446. OCLC 742507686.
