= List of United States Army units with colonial roots =

U.S. Army units with lineages dating back to the colonial era

32 units of the United States Army have lineages which date back to the colonial history of the United States. Of those, 31 are Army National Guard units, including regiments, battalions, companies, batteries and troops, while one is a battalion of the Regular Army's Field Artillery Branch. 29 of the 31 Army National Guard units trace their lineage back to units formed in British America, while the other two trace their lineage back to militia units raised in Puerto Rico when it was still part of the Spanish Empire.

Army National Guard units with British colonial lineages were formed during three distinct periods. The first eight, whose lineages date to between 1636 and 1672, were formed in the New England and Southern Colonies for operations on the American frontier. The next eight, their lineages dating to between 1735 and 1756, were raised for a variety of functions, including frontier operations, colonial expansion, and service in the French and Indian Wars against the French colonial empire, which challenged the British Empire the control of North America. The last group of fourteen, whose lineages date to between 1774 and 1778, were raised during the American Revolution and went on to participate in the American Revolutionary War. The units are listed chronologically from oldest to newest.

== 181st Infantry, MA ARNG (Sixth Massachusetts) ==
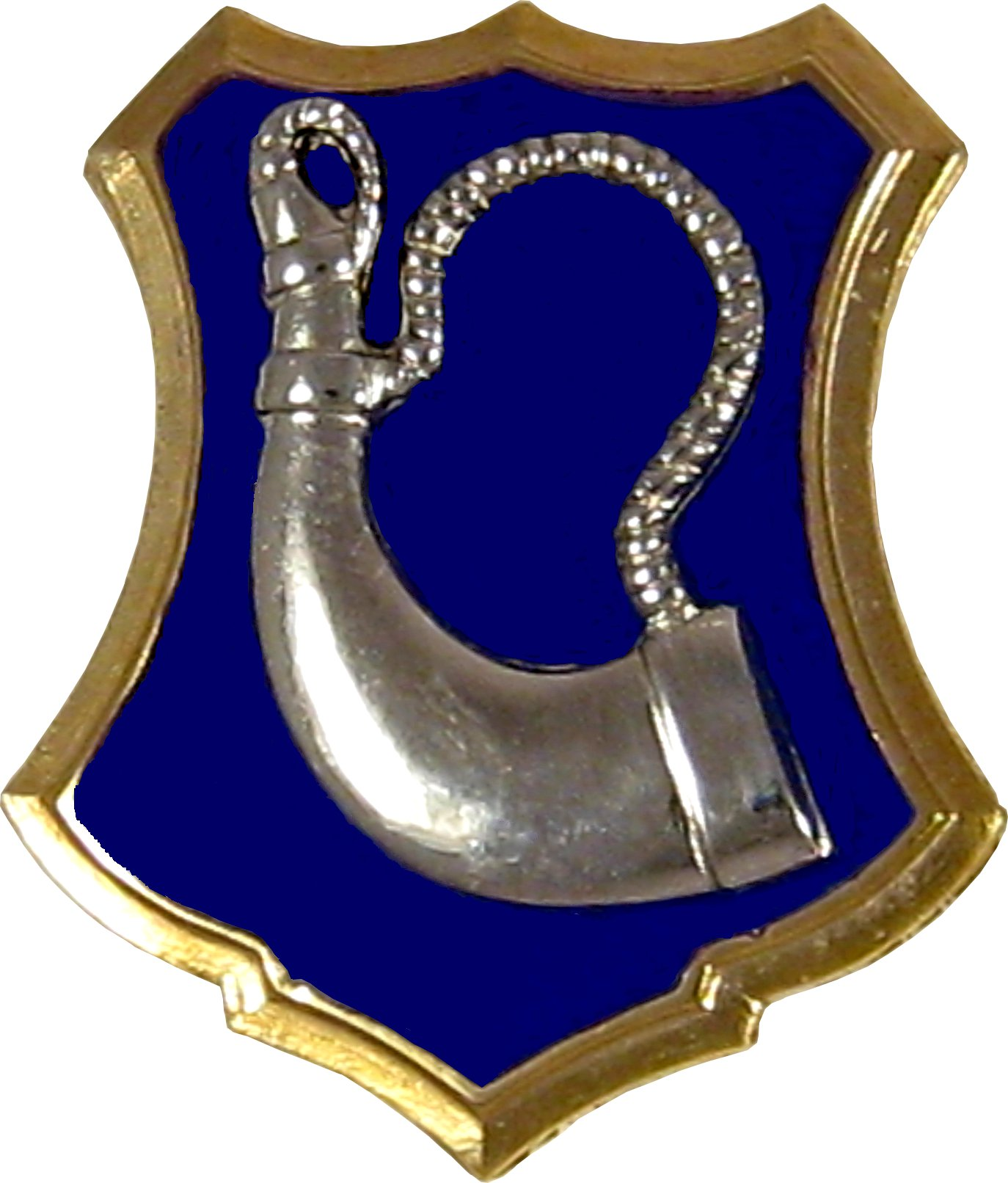
Distinctive Unit Insignia: 181st Inf

Revolutionary War Campaigns: Lexington, Boston, Quebec, Long Island, Trenton, Princeton, Saratoga, Monmouth, New Jersey 1776, New York 1776, New York 1780, and Rhode Island 1778.

The 181st and 182nd Infantry Regiments both trace their origins to the North Regiment, organized on December 13, 1636, from militia units at Charlestown, New Town, Watertown, Dedham, and Concord. In 1643 the North Regiment was redesignated as the Middlesex Regiment.

The first major military action of the Middlesex Regiment was in King Philip’s War (1675–1676), a conflict that had profound effects on the colonization of New England and the fate of the Native people there. King Philip, a Wampanoag chief whose Indian name was Metacom, organized a confederation of tribes to resist the expansion of white settlements in southern New England. King Philip was the son of Massasoit, the chief who had been the architect of the initial collaborative relationship between the colonists and the Indians. The war ended that relationship and replaced it with one in which the colonists were dominant and the Native people were marginalized. The conflict was precipitated when Wampanoag braves killed several cattle owned by a colonist, who retaliated by killing an Indian. The Indians then responded by attacking Swansea, Massachusetts, after which the conflict rapidly degenerated into a brutal cycle of raids, massacres and reprisals in an area that stretched from the Mount Hope peninsula in Rhode Island to central Massachusetts and southern New Hampshire.

Personnel from the Middlesex Regiment participated in the Great Swamp Fight on December 19, 1675. This campaign, involving approximately a thousand militiamen from the Connecticut, Plymouth and Massachusetts Bay Colonies, was a pre-emptive strike on the fortified winter encampment of the Narragansetts, who had remained neutral in the conflict up to that time but whom the colonists feared might join forces with King Philip. Between five and six hundred Indians were killed in the attack. The surviving Narragansetts then joined King Philip and began attacking and burning settlements in southeastern New England. The war ended in 1676 when King Philip was hunted down and killed near Swansea, his body drawn and quartered, and his head displayed on a pole in Plymouth. The conflict took the lives of eight percent of the male population of the Plymouth Colony and resulted in the near annihilation of several Indian tribes.

The colonial predecessor of the 772nd Military Police Battalion and 102nd Infantry (see below) also participated in King Philip's War.

The Middlesex Regiment was expanded in 1680 and divided into two regiments: the Lower (or 1st) and Upper (or 2nd) Middlesex Regiments. The 181st Infantry traces its lineage back to the 2nd Middlesex Regiment; the 182d Infantry, to the 1st Middlesex Regiment.

While remaining in state service during the Revolutionary War, the 2nd Middlesex Regiment was expanded on February 19, 1776, to form the 3rd, 4th, 5th, 6th, and 7th Middlesex Regiments. On April 23, 1775, these regiments were reorganized to produce five regiments in the new Continental Army: Prescott's, Thomas's, Nixon's, Brewer's, and Bridge's Regiments. Bridge's Regiment was disbanded later in the year.

- Prescott's Regiment became the 7th Continental Regiment on January 1, 1776. On January 1, 1776, the 7th Continental Regiment was consolidated with the 23rd Continental Regiment (see Thomas's Regiment below) to form the 2nd Massachusetts Regiment. Prescott's Regiment played a prominent role at the Battle of Bunker Hill and the evacuation of Long Island.
- Thomas's Regiment was redesignated as Bailey's Regiment on July 1, 1775, then consolidated with Cotton's Regiment (authorized April 23, 1775) on January 1, 1776, to form the 23rd Continental Regiment, following which the 23rd and 7th Continental Regiments were consolidated to form the 2nd Massachusetts Regiment.
- Nixon's Regiment became the 4th Continental Regiment on January 1, 1776, and then the 6th Massachusetts Regiment in 1779. Nixon's Regiment was in action at Bunker Hill, the Siege of Boston and the defense of New York City.
- Brewer's Regiment became the 6th Continental Regiment in 1776, Wiggleswoth's Regiment in 1777, and the 13th Massachusetts Regiment in 1779.

In 1785 the 3rd, 4th, 5th, 6th, and 7th Middlesex Regiments were reorganized as the 2nd Brigade, 3rd Division, which, after a number of additional reorganizations and redesignations, became the 6th Regiment of Infantry in 1855 and the 181st Infantry in 1921.

The 181st Infantry also perpetuates the lineage of the 104th Infantry, MA ARNG (Second Massachusetts), as a consequence of the consolidation of the 104th and 181st Infantry Regiments on September 1, 2006, with the newly formed unit retaining the designation of the 181st Infantry. The 181st Infantry's credit for the Quebec Campaign was acquired when it was consolidated with the 104th Infantry.

The 104th Infantry traces its history back to the Hampshire Regiment, Massachusetts Militia, constituted on May 7, 1662, and organized in 1663 from the existing Train Bands from Springfield (organized September 1639), Northampton (organized August 1661) and Hadley (organized May 1661). The Hampshire Regiment was expanded on November 16, 1748, into the North and South Hampshire Regiments. Then, following the formation of Berkshire County from the western portion of Hampshire County, the Berkshire Regiment was formed on January 1, 1763.

On January 22, 1776, these three western Massachusetts militia units were reorganized into the Hampshire County Brigade (Timothy Danielson commanding), consisting of the 1st–6th Hampshire Regiments, and the Berkshire County Brigade (John Fellows commanding), consisting of the 1st and 2nd Berkshire Regiments. Elements of the Hampshire and Berkshire County Brigades were called into active service at various times during the Revolutionary War, and additionally provided five regiments that became part of the Continental Army.

- During May and June 1775, the Hampshire and Berkshire County militias were reorganized to form four named regiments in the Massachusetts Provincial Army–Danielson's, Fellows's, Paterson's and Woodbridge's–which were adopted into the Continental Army on June 14, 1775. These four regiments were reorganized in January 1776 to form the 3rd, 15th and 21st Continental Regiments, which in 1779 were reorganized again to form the 1st Massachusetts Regiment. In addition to its service in the Main Army, the 1st Massachusetts Regiment also spent time assigned to the Canadian and Northern Departments.
- A fifth regiment, Porter's Regiment, was constituted on January 21, 1776, and organized during the winter and spring for a year of service in Canada, following which it was disbanded in December 1776.

The powder horn in the Distinctive Unit Insignia of the 181st Infantry commemorates the service of the Minute Men during the Revolutionary War.

== 182nd Infantry, MA ARNG (North Regiment) ==
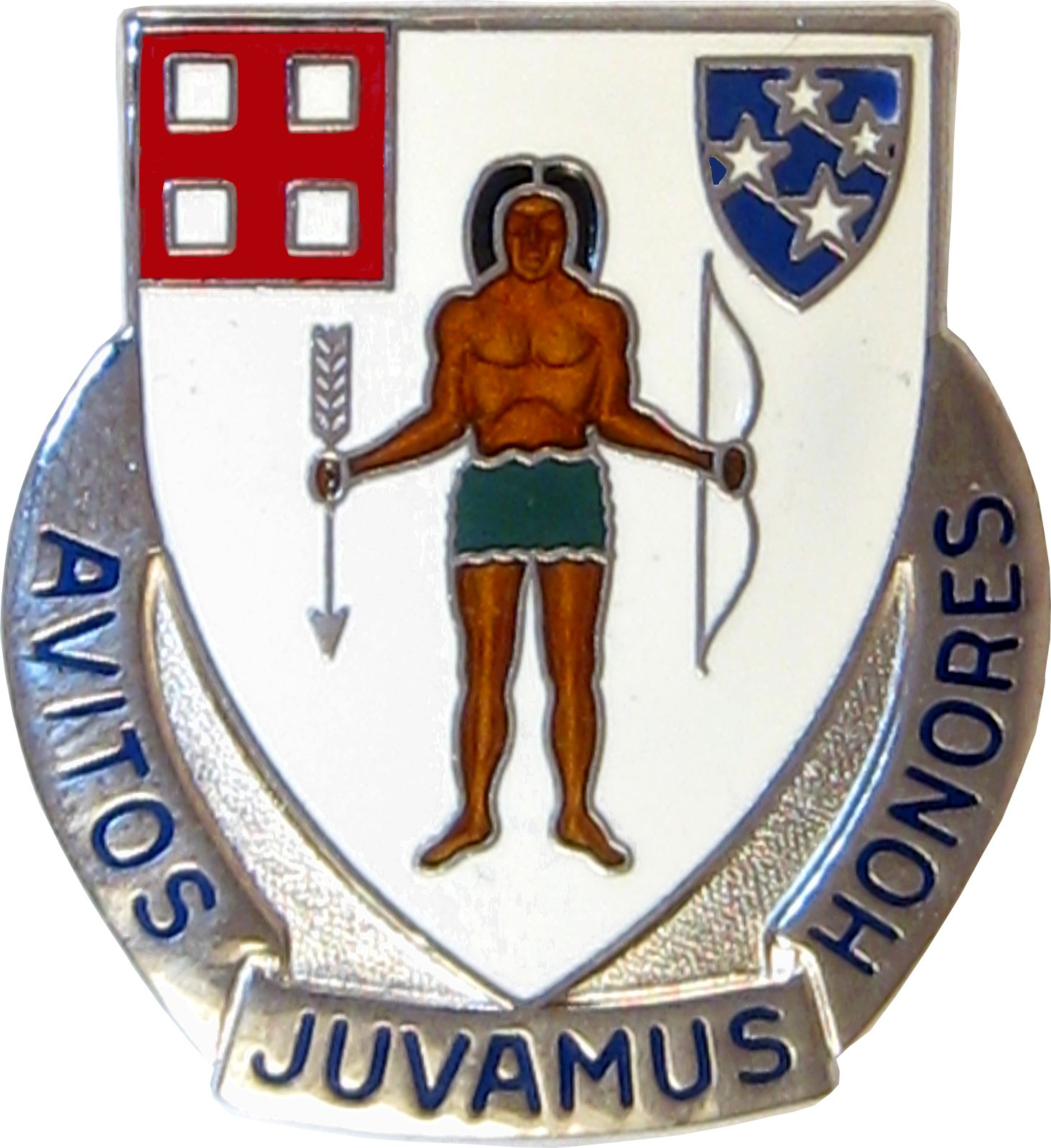
Distinctive Unit Insignia: 182nd Inf

Revolutionary War Campaigns: Lexington, Boston, Quebec, Saratoga, New York 1778, New York 1779.

Like the 181st Infantry, the 182d Infantry also traces its origins to the North Regiment, organized from existing train bands on December 13, 1636. As noted above, the North Regiment was redesignated in September 1643 as the Middlesex Regiment, which was expanded On October 13, 1680, and divided into two regiments: the Lower (or 1st) Middlesex Regiment and the Upper (or 2nd) Middlesex Regiment. The 182d Infantry carries on the lineage of the 1st Middlesex Regiment, consisting of companies from Charlestown, Watertown, Woburn, Malden and Reading, whereas the 181st Infantry perpetuates the lineage of the 2nd Middlesex Regiment.

While remaining in state service during the Revolutionary War, the 1st Middlesex Regiment was expanded in February 1776 to form two new regiments, one of which retained the designation as the 1st Middlesex Regiment, while the other was designated as a new 2nd Middlesex Regiment.

During the course of the war these two regiments remained in state service, and were also reorganized to produce two named regiments that were adopted into the Continental Army: Heath's Regiment (authorized on April 23, 1775, and organized at Roxbury) and Alden's Regiment (constituted on September 16, 1777, and organized at Boston during the spring of 1777).

- Heath's Regiment was redesignated on July 1, 1775, as Greaton's Regiment, which became the 24th Continental Regiment on January 1, 1776. The 24th Continental Regiment was consolidated on January 1, 1777, with the 25th Continental Regiment (authorized April 23, 1775), with the resulting unit being designated as the 25th Continental Regiment. The 25th Continental Regiment ultimately became the 3rd Massachusetts Regiment on August 1, 1779. Greaton's Regiment was part of the force that pursued the British during their retreat from Lexington and Concord, and was also active in raids on British depots during the Siege of Boston.
- Alden's Regiment became the 7th Massachusetts Regiment on August 1, 1779. Alden's Regiment was present at the fort near the village of Cherry Valley in eastern New York that was attacked by a mixed force of Loyalists, British soldiers and Seneca and Mohawk warriors in November 1778. Although the fort was not captured, many residents of the village were massacred. Colonel Alden was killed during the raid.

In 1785 the 1st and 2nd Middlesex Regiments were reorganized as the 1st Brigade, 3rd Division, which, after a number of additional reorganizations and redesignations, became the 5th Regiment of Infantry in 1855 and the 182nd Infantry in 1923.

The white shield of the Distinctive Unit Insignia is from the Massachusetts state flag, and is also the original color for Infantry. The Indian is from the first seal of the Massachusetts Bay Colony. St. George’s cross suggests the British, or colonial, origin of the unit. The shoulder patch of the Americal Division, in which the 182nd Infantry served during World War II, occupies the upper right corner of the crest.

== 101st Engineer Battalion, MA ARNG (East Regiment) ==
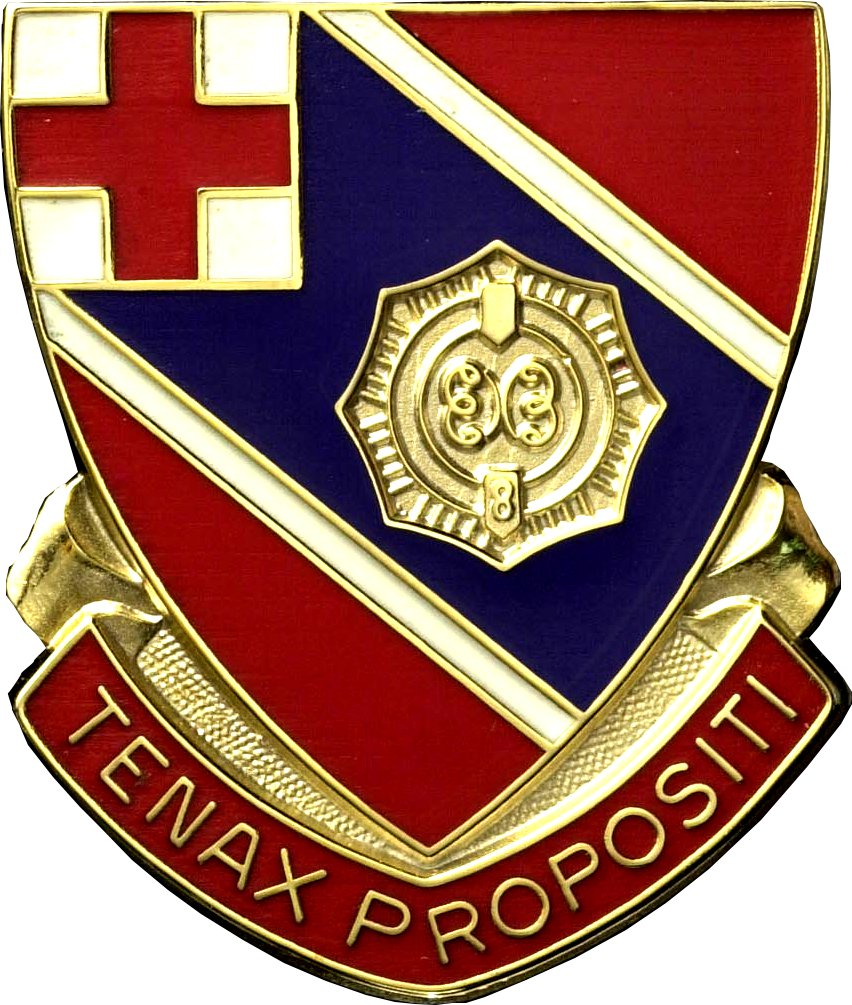
Distinctive Unit Insignia: 101st Eng Bn

Revolutionary War Campaigns: Lexington, Boston, Long Island, Trenton, Princeton, Saratoga, Monmouth, New York 1776, New York 1777, New Jersey 1777, New Jersey 1780, Rhode Island 1777, Rhode Island 1778, Rhode Island 1779.

The 101st Engineer Battalion, like the 181st and 182nd Infantry Regiments, traces its lineage back to militia units from the Boston area that date back to 1636. The 101st Engineer Battalion originated as the East Regiment, formed in the Massachusetts Militia on December 13, 1636, from existing units at Saugus, Salem, Ipswich, and Newbury. The East Regiment was redesignated as the Essex Regiment in 1643, and on October 13, 1680, the Essex Regiment was expanded to form the 1st (South) and 2nd (North) Essex Regiments, and then expanded again in 1689 to form three regiments: the 1st (Lower), 2nd (Upper) and 3rd (Middle) Essex Regiments. Then in 1774 it was expanded again to form the 1st, 2nd, 3d, 4th, 5th and 6th Essex Regiments.

These six regiments were reorganized on February 19, 1776, as the Essex County Brigade, consisting of eight regiments.

While the Essex County Brigade remained in Massachusetts service during the Revolutionary War, five named regiments were formed from it that were adopted by the Continental Army: Glover’s Regiment (authorized April 23, 1775, and organized at Marblehead); Mansfield’s Regiment (authorized April 23, 1775, and organized at Cambridge); Little’s Regiment (authorized April 23, 1775, and organized at Cambridge); Frye’s Regiment (authorized April 23, 1775, and organized at Cambridge); and Lee’s Additional Continental Regiment (authorized January 12, 1777, and organized at Cambridge).

- Glover's Regiment became the 14th Continental Regiment on January 1, 1776, and was disbanded on December 31, 1776. Glover's Regiment was an amphibious unit made up of fishermen from the area around Marblehead. It played a crucial role in the evacuation of Washington's army from Long Island across the East River and in ferrying American forces across the Delaware River prior to the attack on Trenton. It also participated actively in the Battle of Trenton.
- Mansfield's Regiment first became the 27th Continental Regiment on January 1, 1776, Putnam's Regiment on January 1, 1777, and finally the 5th Massachusetts Regiment on August 1, 1779.
- Little's Regiment became the 12th Continental Regiment on January 1, 1776. Little's Regiment was present at Bunker Hill and Long Island.
- Frye's Regiment was disbanded on December 31, 1775, only eight months after its formation.
- Lee's Additional Continental Regiment was consolidated with Henry Jackson's Additional Continental Regiment (authorized January 12, 1777, and organized at Boston from elements of the Boston Regiment and Corps of Independent Cadets) and Henley's Additional Regiment (authorized January 12, 1777, and organized at Boston), with the new units designated as Henry Jackson's Additional Continental Regiment. Jackson's Additional Continental Regiment became the 16th Massachusetts Regiment on July 24, 1780. The 16th Massachusetts Regiment was disbanded on January 1, 1781.

In the reorganization of the Massachusetts Militia following the war, the Essex County Brigade was reorganized as the 2nd Division, consisting of the 1st and 2nd Brigades. The organizational history of the 2nd Division and its elements between 1785 and 1920 is complicated. After various periods as either Infantry or Artillery, the unit was organized as the 1st Engineers in 1920 and as the 101st Engineers in 1921.

The blue stripe in the Distinctive Unit Insignia represents the unit’s earlier service as Infantry, while the red shield is for service as an Engineer unit. The St. George’s cross indicates the British, or colonial, origin of the unit. The badge in the blue stripe was the insignia of the Essex Brigade.

== 101st Field Artillery, MA ARNG (Boston Light Artillery) ==
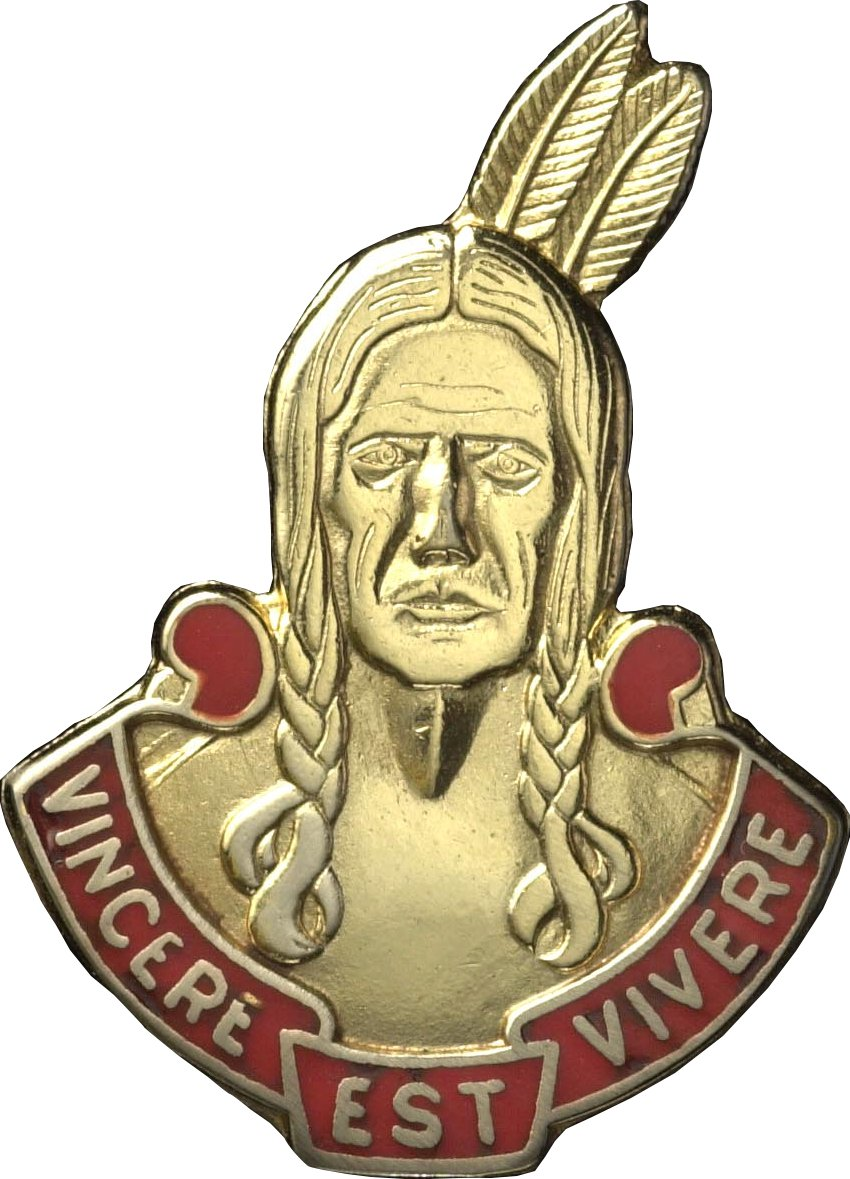
Distinctive Unit Insignia: 101st FA

Revolutionary War Campaigns: Monmouth, Rhode Island 1777, Rhode Island 1778, Rhode Island 1779, New Jersey 1780.

The 101st Field Artillery traces its origins back to new and existing train bands in Boston, Dorcester, Roxbury, Weymouth and Hingham that were organized on December 13, 1636, as the South Regiment. On September 7, 1643, the South Regiment was redesignated as the Suffolk Regiment, which was expanded in 1689 to form the Boston Regiment and the Suffolk Regiment. It was the Boston Regiment that ultimately became the 101st Field Artillery, while the Suffolk Regiment diverged to form a separate lineage.

The Boston Regiment remained in Massachusetts service during the Revolutionary War, but additionally formed Henry Jackson's Additional Continental Regiment, authorized on January 12, 1777, and organized at Boston from elements of the Boston Regiment and the Corps of Independent Cadets.

- Jackson's Additional Regiment was consolidated on April 9, 1779, with Lee's Additional Continental Regiment (authorized January 12, 1777, and organized at Cambridge) and Henley's Additional Continental Regiment (authorized January 12, 1777, and organized at Boston), with the consolidated unit designated as Henry Jackson's Additional Continental Regiment, which was redesignated as the 16th Massachusetts Regiment on July 24, 1780. Jackson's Additional Continental Regiment was present at the Battle of Freeman's Farm, the first phase of the Battle of Saratoga, which thwarted the British attempt to divide New England from the rest of the colonies, and the Battle of Springfield, an American victory that ended British efforts to achieve a dominant position in New Jersey. The regiment was disbanded on January 1, 1781, at New Windsor, New York.

In the reorganization of the Massachusetts Militia following the Revolutionary War, the Boston Regiment was redesignated on April 1, 1788, as the 1st Regiment, 1st Brigade, 1st Division, which was expanded, reorganized and redesignated on August 2, 1798, as the Legionary Brigade, 1st Division, to consist of the Sublegion of Artillery (Volunteer Militia), the Sublegion of Light Infantry (Volunteer Militia), and the 1st, 2nd, and 3rd Sublegions (Standing Militia).

The 101st Field Artillery has a very complex lineage, having incorporated the following historic units into its lineage through a series of consolidations occurring in the nineteenth and twentieth centuries: the National Lancers, organized in 1836; the 2nd Battalion of Light Infantry and the 3rd Regiment of Light Infantry, both organized in 1840; an infantry company in the Independent Division, Massachusetts Volunteer Militia, organized in 1863; the Company of Light Artillery, 1st Brigade, also known as the Boston Light Artillery, organized in 1853, which, through a series of reorganizations, became the 101st Field Artillery in 1917; and to four antiaircraft artillery units organized in the 1940s. Because of the complexity of its organizational history the present-day 101st Field Artillery perpetuates the lineages of the following of organizations: the 241st Coast Artillery, 187th Coast Artillery, 704th Antiaircraft Artillery Battalion and 704th Missile Battalion (in the lineage of the South Regiment); the 102nd Machine Gun Battalion, 110th Cavalry, 200th Field Artillery, 221st Field Artillery and 180th Field Artillery Battalions (in the lineage of the National Lancers); the 211th Field Artillery (in the lineages of the 2nd Battalion and the 3rd Regiment of Light Infantry); Company L of the 372nd Infantry, the 272nd Field Artillery Battalion and the 972nd Antiaircraft Artillery Battalion (in the lineage of the infantry company in the Independent Division, Massachusetts Volunteer Militia); and the 126th Antiaircraft Artillery, 685th Antiaircraft Artillery, 747th Antiaircraft Artillery and 772nd Antiaircraft Artillery Battalions (all organized in the 1940s).

The Indian head in the Distinctive Unit Insignia is from the seal of Massachusetts from 1628. The red color of the scroll is for Artillery. The Distinctive Unit Insignia was formerly the Distinctive Unit Insignia of the 211th Field Artillery, which is one of the units in the lineage of the 101st Field Artillery.

== 772nd Military Police Company, MA ARNG ==
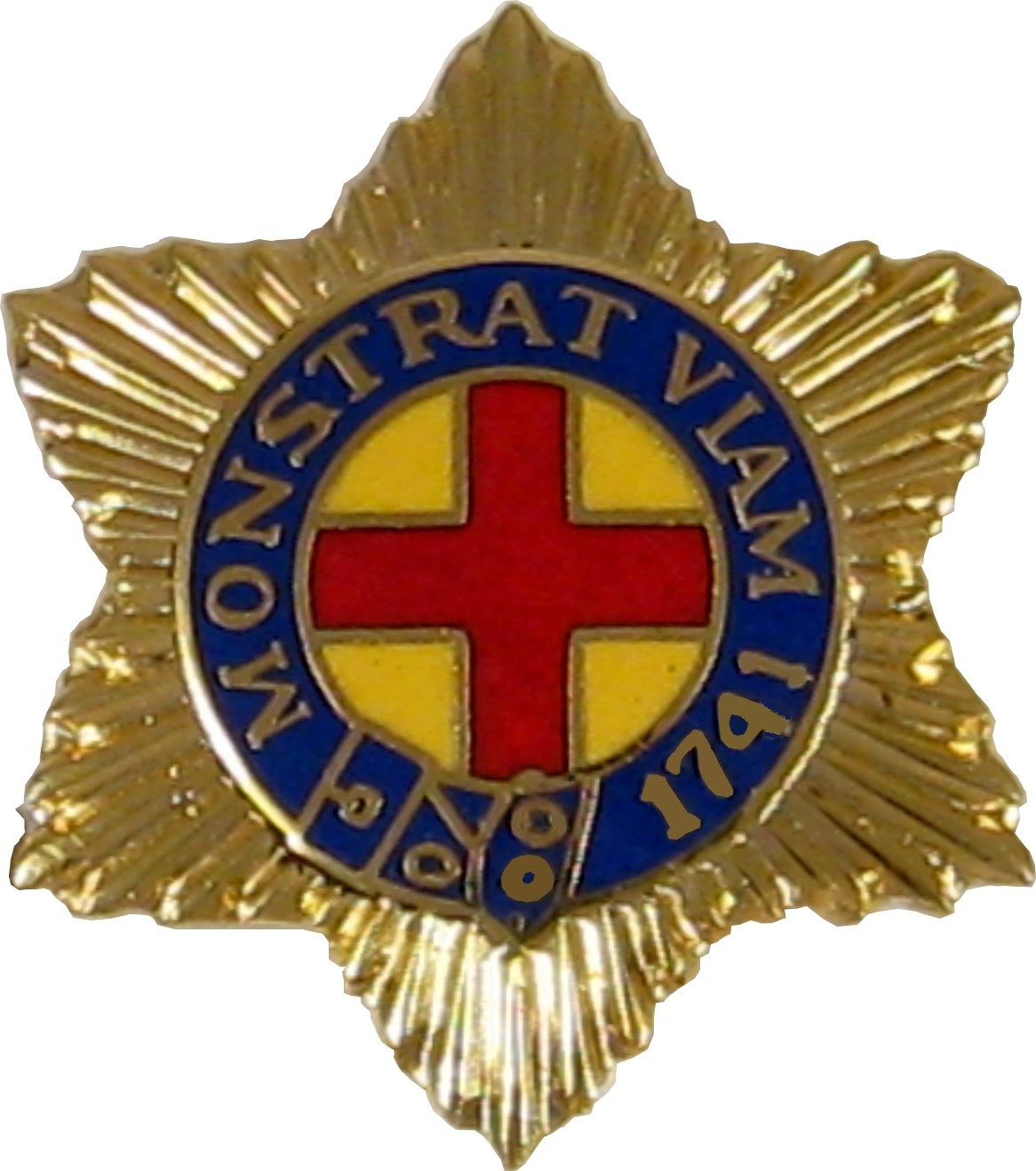
Distinctive Unit Insignia: 211th MP Bn

Revolutionary War Campaigns: New York 1776 and Rhode Island 1777

The 772nd Military Police Company traces its origins to the Cohannet Train Band, Plymouth Colony Militia, organized on March 3, 1638. In 1639, the unit became the Taunton Train Band. The first major military action of the Taunton Militia was in King Philip’s War (1675–1676). The Taunton Militia defended Taunton and Swansea from attacks by King Philip’s warriors and later provided soldiers for other offensive operations that ultimately brought an end to the Indians’ resistance. For a description of the involvement of other colonial militia in King Philip's War, refer to the sections on the 181st Infantry (above). The Taunton Militia became a part of the Massachusetts Militia in 1690 when the Plymouth Colony was absorbed into the Massachusetts Colony.

During the century that intervened between the end of King Philip's War and the Revolutionary War, France and Great Britain fought a series of wars for the control of North America. The Taunton Militia was called upon by the British to fight against the French and their Indian allies in all of these wars: King William’s War (1689–1697), Queen Anne’s War (1702–1713), King George’s War (1744–1748) and the French and Indian War (1756–1763), which culminated in a victory for the British.

In 1703 the Taunton Train Band was reorganized as the Eastward Company; in 1709 as the first Foot Company, Bristol County Regiment of Militia, and in 1736 as the First Foot Company, Third Regiment of Militia, Bristol County.

- In 1776 the First Foot Company, Third Regiment, Bristol County became the Third Foot Company, Third Regiment, Bristol County Brigade.

The lineage of the Taunton Militia involved many reorganizations and redesignations during the rest of the eighteenth and nineteenth centuries. But by 1917, when the modern National Guard was taking shape, it had become a Coast Artillery company, and later as a company or battery in the 101st Field Artillery. Following consolidation with the 726th Maintenance Battalion in 1967, the unit was reorganized and redesignated as the 772nd Military Police Company.

Since companies are not issued their own separate Distinctive Unit Insignias, soldiers in the 772nd Military Police Company wear the Distinctive Unit Insignia of the higher echelon unit in which it serves, i.e., the 211th Military Police Battalion, MA ARNG. The 211th Military Police Battalion also has a lineage that dates back to the colonial militia (see below).

== 276th Engineer Battalion, VA ARNG "First Virginia" ==
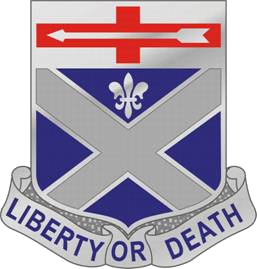
Distinctive Unit Insignia: 276th Engineer Bn

Revolutionary War Campaigns: Virginia 1775; Long Island; Trenton; New York 1776; Princeton; Brandwine; Germantown; Monmouth; South Carolina 1780

The 276th Engineer Battalion was organized in the colony of Virginia as Charles City-Henrico Counties Regiment of Militia in 1652. During the French and Indian War it was expanded to form the 1st Virginia Regiment under George Washington. Reconstructed in State Line as 1st Regiment Virginia Regulars, Col Patrick Henry; organized at Williamsburg in October 1775 and transferred to Continental Line 1 November 1775. Surrendered to British Forces 12 May 1780 at Charleston, S.C.

== 125th Quartermaster Company, MA ARNG ==
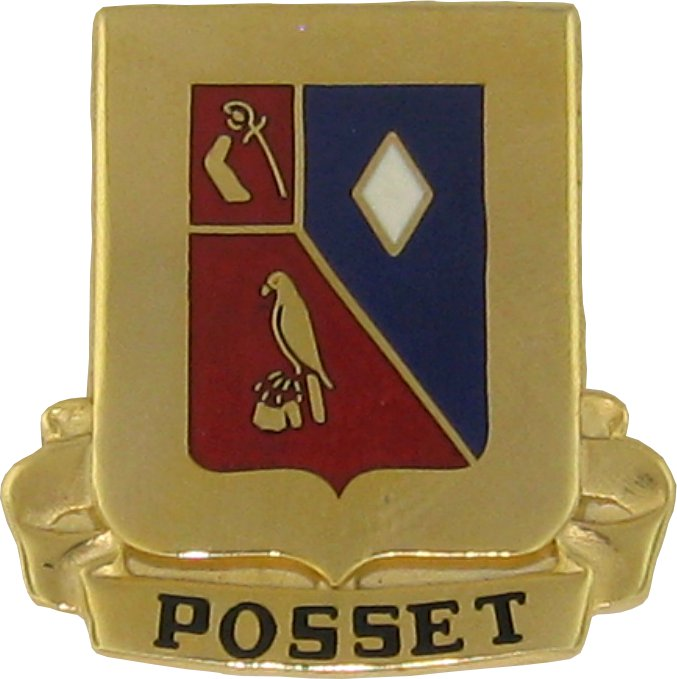
Distinctive Unit Insignia: 164 Trans Bn

Revolutionary War Campaigns: Lexington, Boston, Long Island, Trenton, Princeton, Saratoga and Monmouth

The 125th Quartermaster Company traces its history back to December 3, 1660, when the Company of Foot, Middlesex Regiment, was organized in the Massachusetts Militia at Marlborough. When the Middlesex Regiment was expanded in 1680 to form the 1st and 2nd Middlesex Regiments, this company went into the 2nd Middlesex Regiment. Thus, the 125th Quartermaster Company shared its early history with the 181st Infantry (see above).

While remaining in Massachusetts service during the Revolutionary War, this company additionally formed Captain Michael Barn's Company, Ward's Regiment, on June 14, 1775, which was adopted into the Continental Army.

- Barn's Company became a company in Wesson's Regiment on January 1, 1777, and then a company in the 9th Massachusetts Regiment on August 1, 1779.

- In the meantime, when the 2nd Middlesex Regiment was expanded on February 19, 1776, to form the 3rd, 4th, 5th, 6th, and 7th Middlesex Regiments, the company in the 2nd Middlesex Regiment destined to become the 125th Quartermaster Company was reorganized as the 2nd Company, 4th Middlesex Regiment.

From the end of the Revolutionary War until 1873, the predecessor of the 125th Quartermaster Company served as an Infantry company in a series of different units, becoming Company E, 6th Regiment of Infantry, by which time the predecessor of the 181st Infantry had become the 6th Regiment of Infantry. The lineages of the 125th Quartermaster Company and the 181st Infantry continued to be linked until 1965 when Company C, 1st Battalion, 181st Infantry, was reorganized as Company A, 26th Supply and Transport Battalion, which was reorganized as the 125th Quartermaster Company in 1996.

Since companies are not issued Distinctive Unit Insignia, soldiers in the 125th Quartermaster Company wear the Distinctive Unit Insignia of the 164th Transportation Battalion, the battalion to which it is assigned. The shield of the DUI of the 164th Transportation Battalion is the coat or arms approved for the old 241st Coast Artillery Regiment within a gold border, indicating descent from that organization. The Headquarters Detachment of the 164th Transportation Battalion traces its origin to the Headquarters Battery, 2-241st Coast Artillery.

== 102nd Infantry, CT ARNG (First and Second Connecticut) ==
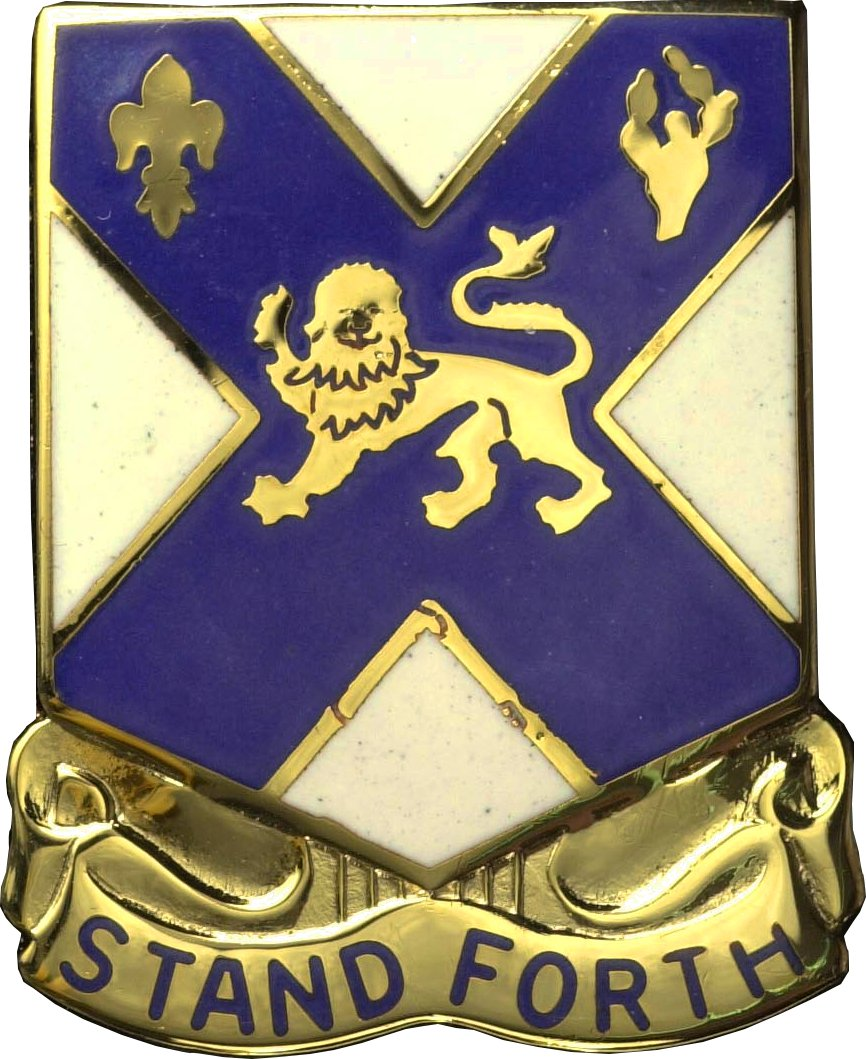
Distinctive Unit Insignia: 102nd Inf

Revolutionary War Campaigns: Saratoga, New York 1776, New York 1777, Connecticut 1777, Connecticut 1778, Connecticut 1779, Connecticut 1780, Connecticut 1781

The 102nd Infantry traces its origins to the New Haven and Hartford County Regiments, Connecticut Militia, constituted on June 26, 1672, and organized from existing train bands. Elements of the New Haven militia participated in the Great Swamp Fight and other actions during King Philip's War (see 181st Infantry above). In October, 1739, the New Haven and Hartford County Regiments were reorganized and redesignated as the 1st and 2nd Regiments of the Connecticut Militia.

- Elements the 1st and 2nd Regiments of the Connecticut Militia were called into active service during the Revolutionary War and served in New York and Connecticut.

The 1st and 2nd Regiments underwent a number of reorganizations and redesignations during, and in the aftermath, of World War I. The 1st Regiment became the 169th Infantry in 1921; the 2nd Regiment, the 170th Infantry. After many more reorganizations, the 169th and 170th Infantry were consolidated in 1992 to form the 102nd Infantry.

The British lion in the Distinctive Unit Insignia symbolizes Revolutionary War service against the British; the blue saltire, Civil War service with the Union; the cactus, service along the Mexican border in 1916; and the fleur-de-lis, service in France during World War I. The white shield represents service as Infantry.

== 192nd Military Police Battalion, CT ARNG (The Fairfield County Regiment) ==
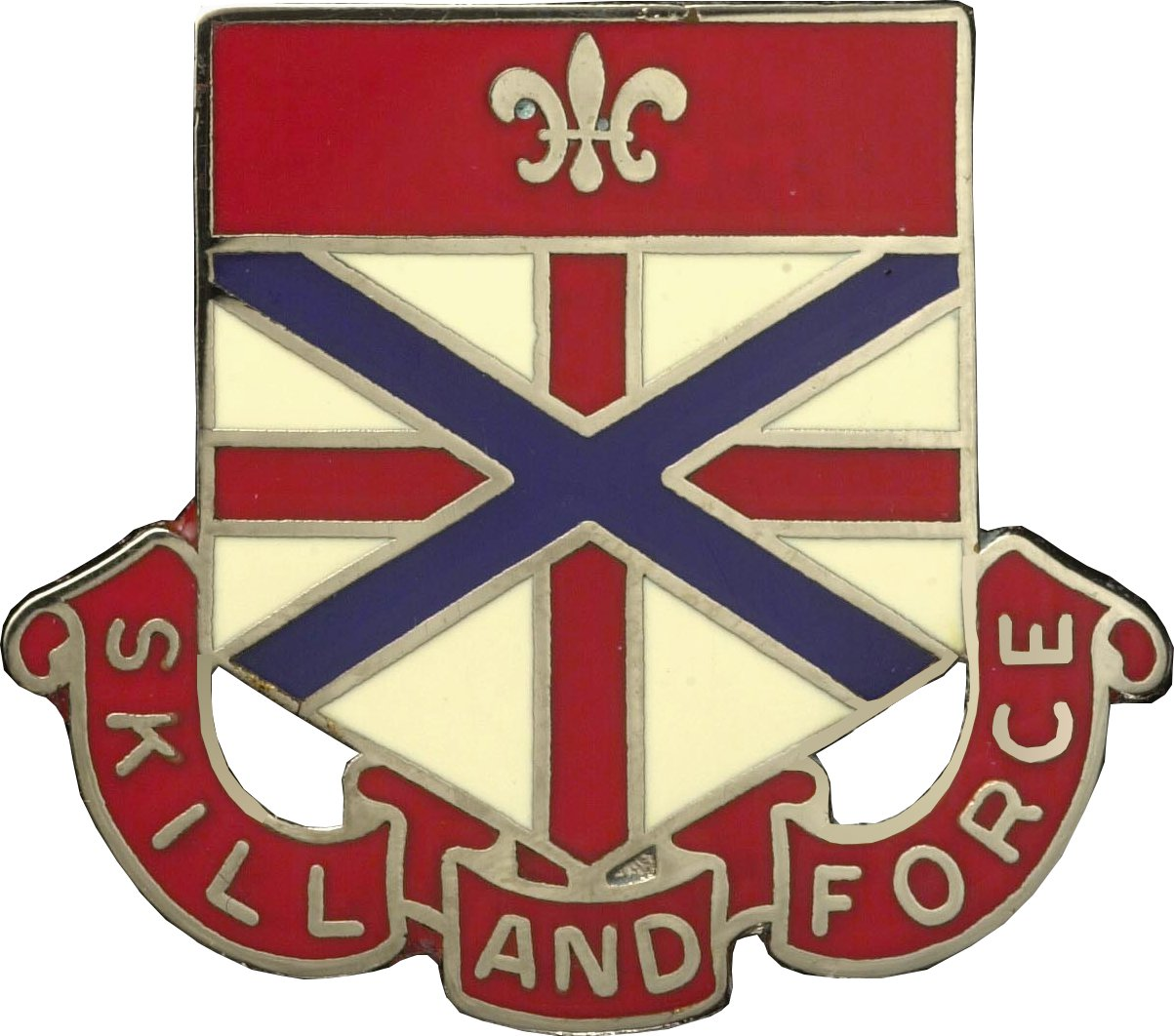
Distinctive Unit Insignia: 192nd MP Bn

Revolutionary War Campaigns: Saratoga, New York 1776, New York 1777, Connecticut 1777, Connecticut 1778, Connecticut 1779, Connecticut 1780, Connecticut 1781, Rhode Island 1778

The 192nd Military Police Battalion had its origins in the Fairfield County Regiment, Connecticut Militia, which was constituted on June 26, 1672. The regiment was reorganized in 1739 as the 4th and 9th Regiments of the Connecticut Militia, consisting of companies in Norwalk, Stamford, Greenwich and Ridgefield.

- During the Revolutionary War the 4th and 9th Regiments of the Connecticut Militia served in New York, Connecticut and Rhode Island.

In 1786 these two regiments were reorganized and expanded to form the 4th, 9th, 16th and 28th Regiments, and again in 1792 to form the 4th, 9th, 16th, 28th and 34th Regiments. In 1847 these five regiments were consolidated to form the 8th Regiment, to consist of companies from Fairfield County.

After still more organizational changes in the aftermath of the Civil War and the run-up to World War I, the Fairfield County Regiment was reorganized as eight Coast Artillery companies in 1917, which were reorganized and redesignated in 1921 as the 192nd Artillery and later as the 192nd Field Artillery. In 2003 the 192nd Field Artillery was redesignated as the 192nd Chemical Battalion, which in 2006 became the 192nd Military Police Battalion.

The cross of St. George on the Distinctive Unit Insignia is for Revolutionary War service; the blue saltire, for Civil War service with the Union, and the fleur-de-lis on the red stripe is for Artillery service in France during World War I. Earlier service as Infantry is indicated by the white in the shield, white having once been the Infantry’s color.

== 201st Field Artillery, WV ARNG (First West Virginia) ==
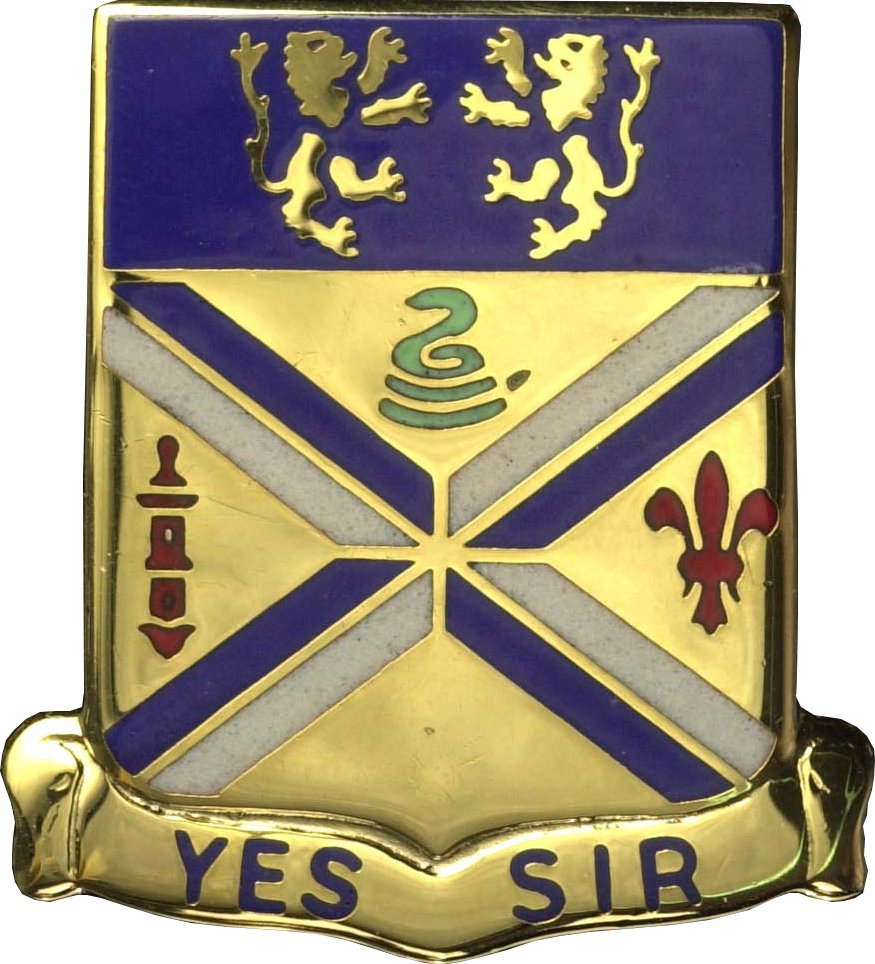
Distinctive Unit Insignia: 201st FA

Revolutionary War Campaigns: Boston, New York 1776

The 201st Field Artillery traces it origins to militia companies formed in the northern and western part of the Virginia Colony, the earliest of which was Captain Morgan Morgan’s Company of Volunteer Militia of Orange Country, Virginia, organized on February 17, 1735. In 1738 the unit was redesignated as Morgan’s Company, Frederick County Militia. Morgan Morgan is reputed to have been the first white settler in what is now the state of West Virginia.

- During the Revolutionary War several militia companies from this part of Virginia were organized for frontier defense and subsequently for service in Virginia regiments of the Continental Line. One such company, Captain Hugh Stephenson’s Independent Company of Virginia Riflemen, which was organized on June 14, 1775, became a part of the army that assembled around Boston in the spring and summer of 1775. Later in 1776 Captain Stephenson’s Company expanded to four companies and consolidated with two companies from Maryland to form the Maryland and Virginia Rifle Regiment. A major portion of this regiment was captured by the British at Fort Washington, New York, in 1776, following which the regimental organization was disbanded. The remaining Virginia portion was transferred in February, 1777, to the 11th Virginia Regiment; the Maryland portion to the 4th Maryland Regiment.

According to a story often featured in publications by the West Virginia National Guard, when Hugh Stephenson’s and Daniel Morgan’s Independent Companies of Virginia Riflemen arrived in Boston shortly after the outbreak of the Revolutionary War, General Washington rode out to meet them, dismounted, took every man by his hand, and proclaimed “Let me plant my banner in West Augusta and I will surround it with fighting men who will drive the invaders from our land.” However, David McCullough presents a somewhat different reaction to the mountain men, based upon accounts by a Boston physician named James Thacher. To quote McCullough, “Welcome as they were at first, the riflemen soon proved even more indifferent to discipline than the New Englanders, and obstreperous to the point that Washington began to wish they had never come.” Present-day members of the 201st Field Artillery are doubtless equally proud of both of these descriptions of their comrades from an earlier era.

Volunteer elements of the 10th and 16th Brigades were mustered into federal service in 1794 to suppress the Whiskey Rebellion, an uprising of farmers in western Pennsylvania challenging the collection of a federal excise tax on whiskey. President Washington ordered a military force composed of militia units from four adjacent states into the area to enforce the law. In so doing he asserted the authority of the federal government to enforce federal law and gained the support of state governments for the exercise of such authority.

The lineage of the militia from the western part of Virginia that became West Virginia during the Civil War is complex. The lineages of units from the southern and northern portions of the state are perpetuated by the 150th Armor (see below) and 201st Field Artillery, respectively. Although the militias from western Virginia contributed troops to both the Union and Confederate Armies, only those units with Union service are included in the lineages of the 150th Armor and 201st Field Artillery. By 1923 the units destined to become today's 201st Field Artillery had been reconstituted as the 1st Infantry Regiment, West Virginia National Guard, and organized in 1924–1926. On May 11, 1926, the 1st Infantry Regiment became the 201st Field Artillery.

The blue stripe at the top of the Distinctive Unit Insignia (the chief) represents service as Infantry, while the two lions symbolize service in two wars against the British. The saltire, half blue and half gray, signifies service during the Civil War in both the Union and Confederate armies. The Roman sword indicates service in the War with Spain, and the fleur-de-lis indicates service in France during World War I.

== HHD/211th Military Police Battalion, MA ARNG (First Corps of Cadets) ==
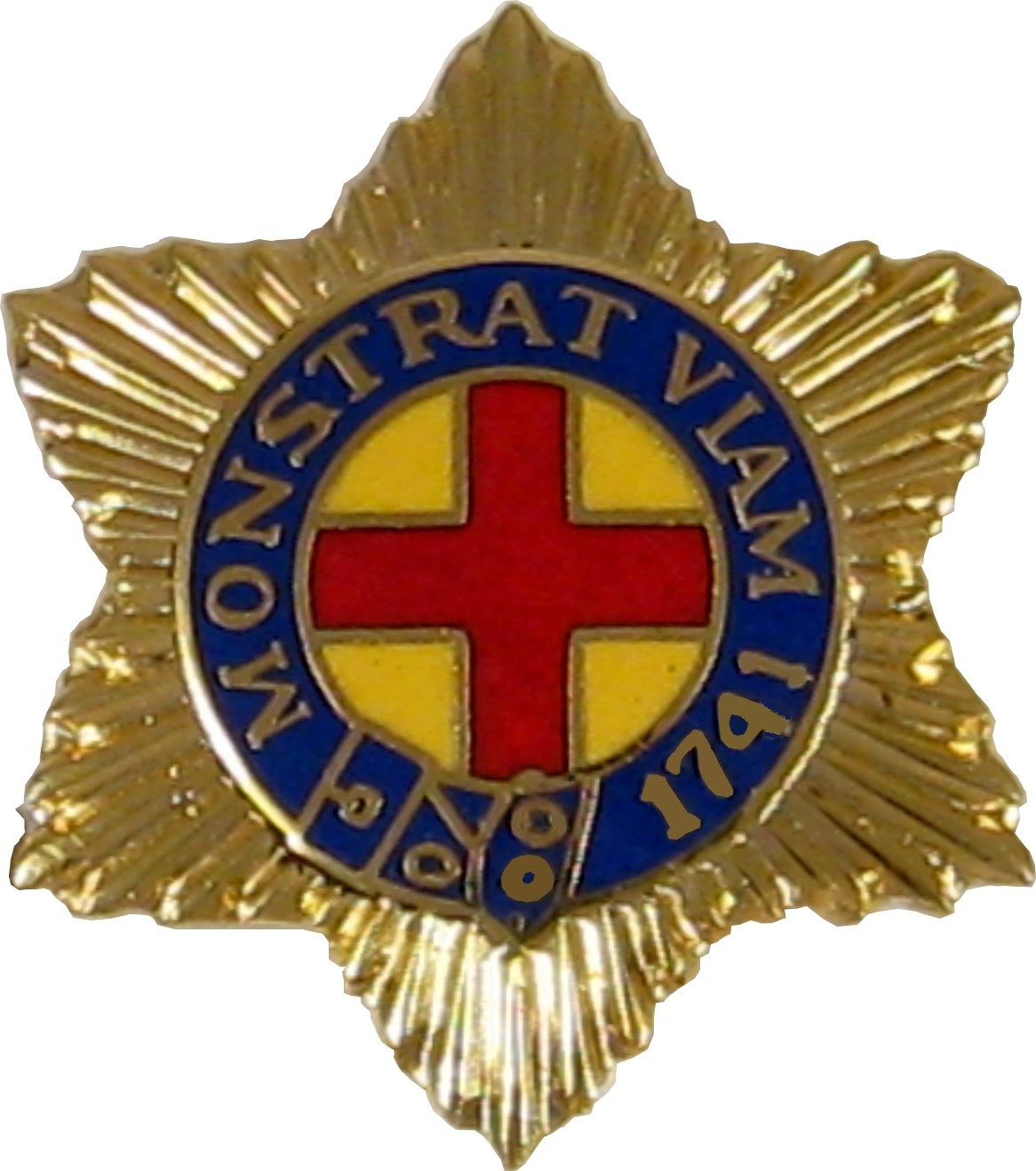
Distinctive Unit Insignia: 211th MP Bn

Revolutionary War Campaign Credits: Monmouth, Rhode Island 1777, Rhode Island 1778, Rhode Island 1779, New Jersey 1780

The Headquarters and Headquarters Detachment, 211th Military Police Battalion, traces its origins to the First Corps of Cadets, Massachusetts Volunteer Militia, organized in Boston on October 16, 1741, consisting of “sixty-four young Gentlemen.” The initial mission of the First Corps of Cadets, which cherished its status as a socially elite organization, was to serve as the ceremonial bodyguard for the royal governors of the colony.

During 1774 as tensions increased between Great Britain and the colonists in the Boston area, the new royal governor, Lieutenant General Sir Thomas Gage, dismissed the commander of the Cadets, Lieutenant Colonel John Hancock, for his role in leading the revolt against British import duties, whereupon the Cadets voted to disband and returned their colors to the governor.

- During the late spring or early summer of 1776, following the British evacuation from Boston, the Cadets reorganized as the Independent Company of Cadets, commanded by Captain Henry Jackson. In 1777 Jackson was commissioned as colonel and placed in command of a newly formed Additional Continental Regiment. The Cadets provided the officer cadre for the new regiment. The Cadets remained in state service during the war, but were activated three times during 1777 and 1778 for service in Rhode Island.

In 1786 the Cadets were mobilized to serve in the militia that suppressed Shays’ Rebellion, an armed uprising by farmers in western Massachusetts protesting high taxes and courts’ judgments against debtors.

Since 1917 the First Corps of Cadets has served in a number of capacities, having at various times been designated as the 101st Engineer Regiment, the 211th Coast Artillery, as battalions in the 211th Antiaircraft Group, the 126th Tank Battalion, the 220th Infantry Regiment, the 126th Signal Battalion, and finally in 1996 as the Headquarters and Headquarters Detachment, 211th Military Police Battalion.

The Distinctive Unit Insignia is the old badge of the First Corps of Cadets, which is a variation of the insignia of the Coldstream Guards in the British Army. The Cadets also wore a uniform similar to that worn by the Coldstream Guards. The connection between the Cadets and the Guards was their similar role as household guards–for the sovereign in the case of the Coldstream Guards and the royal governor in the case of the First Corps of Cadets.

== 116th Infantry, VA ARNG (Stonewall Brigade) ==
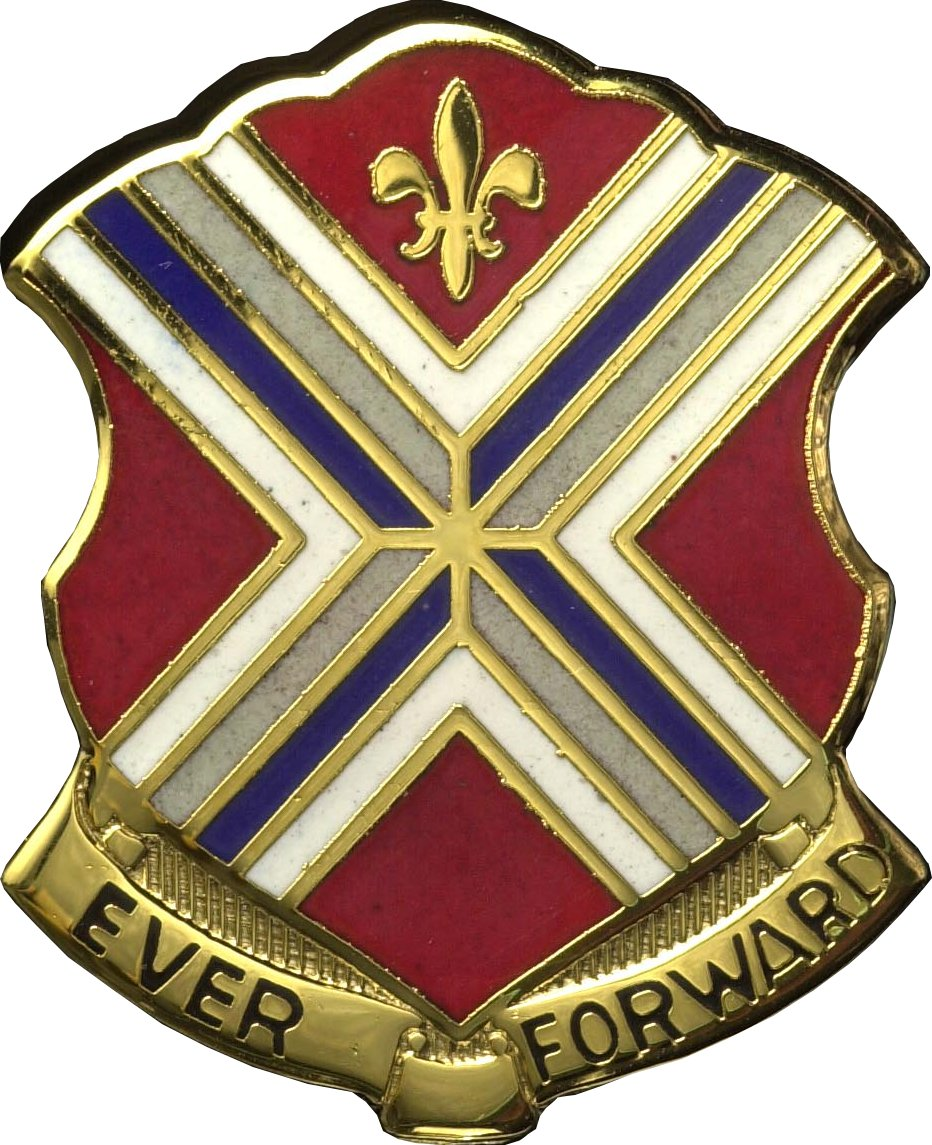
Distinctive Unit Insignia: 116th Inf

Revolutionary War Campaigns: Brandywine, Germantown, Monmouth, Charleston, Cowpens, Guilford Court House, Yorktown, Virginia 1775, Virginia 1776, Virginia 1781, North Carolina 1781, South Carolina 1781

The 116th Infantry had its origins in the Augusta County Regiment of Militia, which was organized on November 3, 1741.

The Augusta County Regiment was called into service at various times during the French and Indian War and during Lord Dunmore’s War in 1774. Lord Dunmore’s War was a campaign against the Native tribes west of the Appalachian Mountains, initiated by the Royal Governor of Virginia, John Murray, Fourth Earl of Dunmore. The war was preceded by growing resistance by the Indians to the expansion of white settlement into what is now Kentucky. The Proclamation of 1763, issued by King George III following the conclusion of the French and Indian War, had reserved, at least temporarily, the land between the Appalachians and the Mississippi River for Indian tribes, a restriction that was deeply resented by the colonists as an intrusion by Britain into colonial affairs. The war ended with the decisive defeat of a force composed largely of Shawnees and Mingos at the Battle of Point Pleasant, near the juncture of the Kanawha and Ohio Rivers. The Battle of Point Pleasant is often called the first battle of the American Revolution, since it was fought in defiance of British desires and also because it cleared Indian tribes that were potential allies of the British from western Virginia.

During the Revolutionary War the Augusta County Regiment, or its elements, was called into service and provided the following companies to the Continental Army: Fontaine's Company, Stephenson's Company, Hayse's Company, Laird's Company and Syme's Company.

- Captain William Fontaine’s Company was an element of the 2nd Virginia Regiment, which was authorized on August 21, 1775, and organized at Williamsburg on October 21, 1775. The 2nd Virginia was adopted by the Continental Army on November 1, 1775, and assigned first to the Southern Department and then in 1776 to the Main Army. It was actively engaged during the defense of Philadelphia in 1777–1778. Following reassignment to the Southern Department in 1780, the regiment was captured during the surrender of Charleston.
- Captain David Stephenson’s Company was an element of the 8th Virginia Regiment (German Regiment), which was authorized on January 11, 1776, and organized February–April, 1776, at Suffolk County Court House to consist of companies from Frederick, Dunmore (Shenandoah), Berkeley, Augusta, Hampshire, Fincastle and Culpeper Counties and the West Augusta District. The 8th Virginia Regiment was adopted by the Continental Army on May 25, 1776, serving during 1776 as an element of the Southern Department during 1777–1778 and later as an element of the Main Army.
- Captain John Hayse’s Company was an element of the 9th Virginia Regiment, authorized on January 11, 1776, and organized during February and March, 1776, on the Eastern Shore to consist of companies from Accomac, Northampton, Goochland, Albemarle and Augusta Counties. The 9th Virginia was adopted by the Continental Army on May 31, 1776, and was present at the Battles of Brandywine and Germantown. Much of the regiment was captured at Germantown. In 1789 the 9th Virginia was consolidated with the 1st Virginia, with the consolidated unit being designated as the 1st Virginia Regiment. The unit was captured on May 12, 1780, by the British Army during the Siege of Charleston.
- Captains David Laird’s and John Syme’s Companies were elements of the 10th Virginia Regiment, which was authorized on September 16, 1776, and assigned to the Main Army. It was organized in February 1777 to consist of companies from Augusta, Amherst, Caroline, Culpeper, Cumberland, Fairfax, Fauquier, Orange, Spotsylvania, Stafford and King George Counties. It served first in the 2nd Virginia Brigade and later in the 3rd Virginia Brigade. The 10th Virginia was reorganized and redesignated in 1779 as the 6th Virginia Regiment, and reassigned to the Southern Department. It was captured during the Siege of Charleston.

The Augusta County Regiment was expanded in 1792 to form the 32nd and 93rd Regiments, and again in 1839 to form the 32nd, 93rd and 160th Regiments. By the time of the Civil War these three regiments had become five regiments that comprised the 1st Brigade, Army of the Shenandoah (later designated as the Stonewall Brigade), plus the 52nd Virginia. Through a series of subsequent reorganizations, the regiments were combined to form the 116th Infantry in 1917.

The red shield of the Distinctive Unit Insignia indicates an Artillery tradition in the regiment. The gray portion of the saltire indicates Confederate service during the Civil War, while the blue portion commemorates post-Civil War service in the blue uniform of the U.S. Army. The fleur-de-lis indicates service in France during World War I.

== 111th Infantry, PA ARNG (The Associators) ==
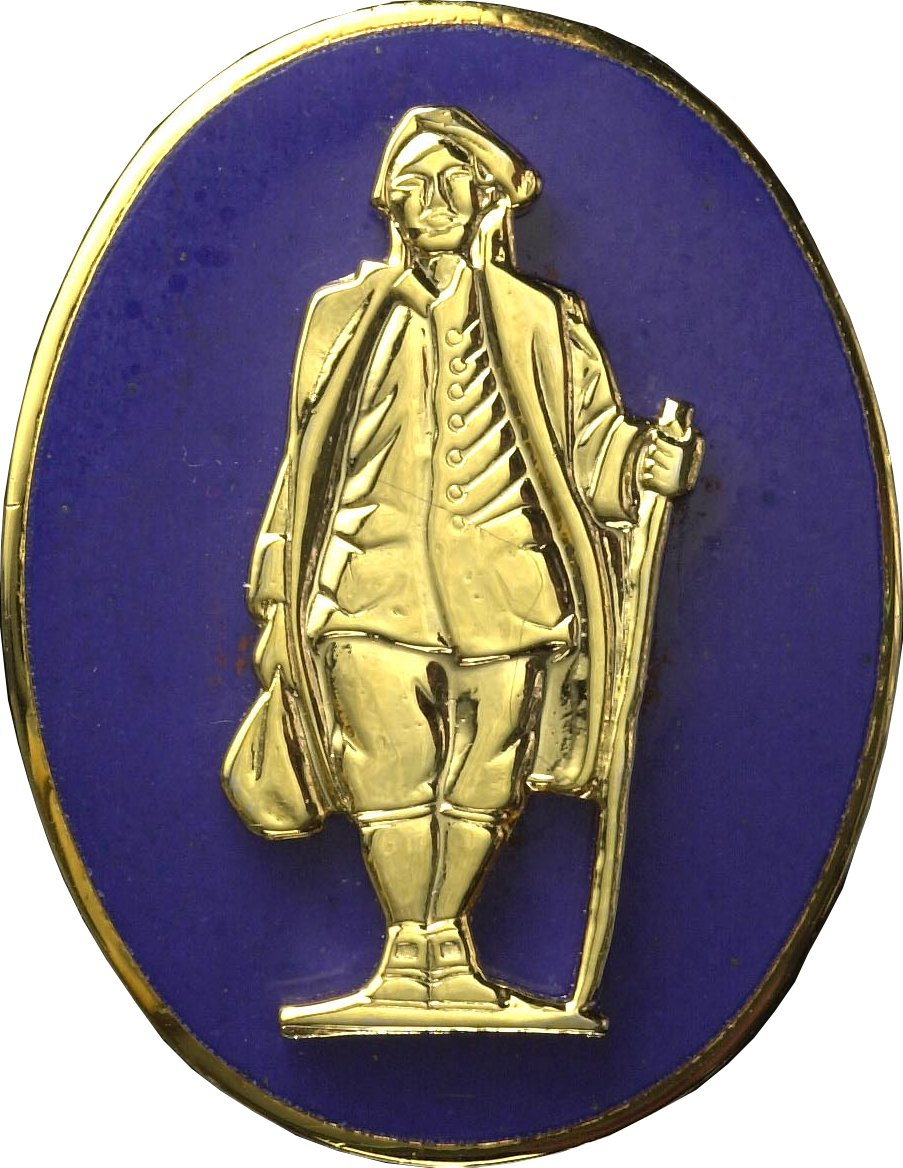
Distinctive Unit Insignia: 111th Inf

Revolutionary War Campaigns: Trenton, Princeton, Brandywine, Germantown

The 111th Infantry traces its origins to the Associators, founded on November 21, 1747, at Philadelphia by Benjamin Franklin. Because of the pacifism of the Quakers who controlled the Pennsylvania Colony since its founding it 1681, Pennsylvania was the only colony that did not have a militia tradition. However, during King George's War (1744–1748), Philadelphia was threatened by French privateers operating on the Delaware River. Benjamin Franklin, realizing the necessity of having some kind of military force to defend Philadelphia, proposed an association of volunteer militia, resulting in the formation of the Associators on November 21, 1747. The 111th Infantry traces its origins to the Associators, and, therefore, is derived from the first citizen militia to exist in Pennsylvania. On December 29, 1747, the Associators were organized as the Associated Regiment of Foot of Philadelphia. They continued to exist as a citizen militia until the outbreak of the American Revolution.

- In 1775 the Associated Regiment of Foot of Philadelphia was reorganized as the Associators of the City and Liberties of Philadelphia, and then reorganized again on March 17, 1777, as the Philadelphia Brigade of Militia. The Philadelphia Brigade was not adopted into the Continental Army, but joined Washington's Main Army during its Trenton-Princeton Campaign.

In 1793 the Philadelphia Brigade was reorganized in the Pennsylvania Militia to form the 1st Brigade, 1st Division. After many reorganizations and redesignations during the nineteenth century and early twentieth century, the Associators became the 110th Infantry in 1917, and the 111th Infantry in 1921.

The Distinctive Unit Insignia consists of a reproduction of the statue of Benjamin Franklin by R. Tait McKenzie, honoring the role of Benjamin Franklin in organizing the Associators. The oval is blue to signify service as Infantry.

== 118th Field Artillery, GA ARNG ==
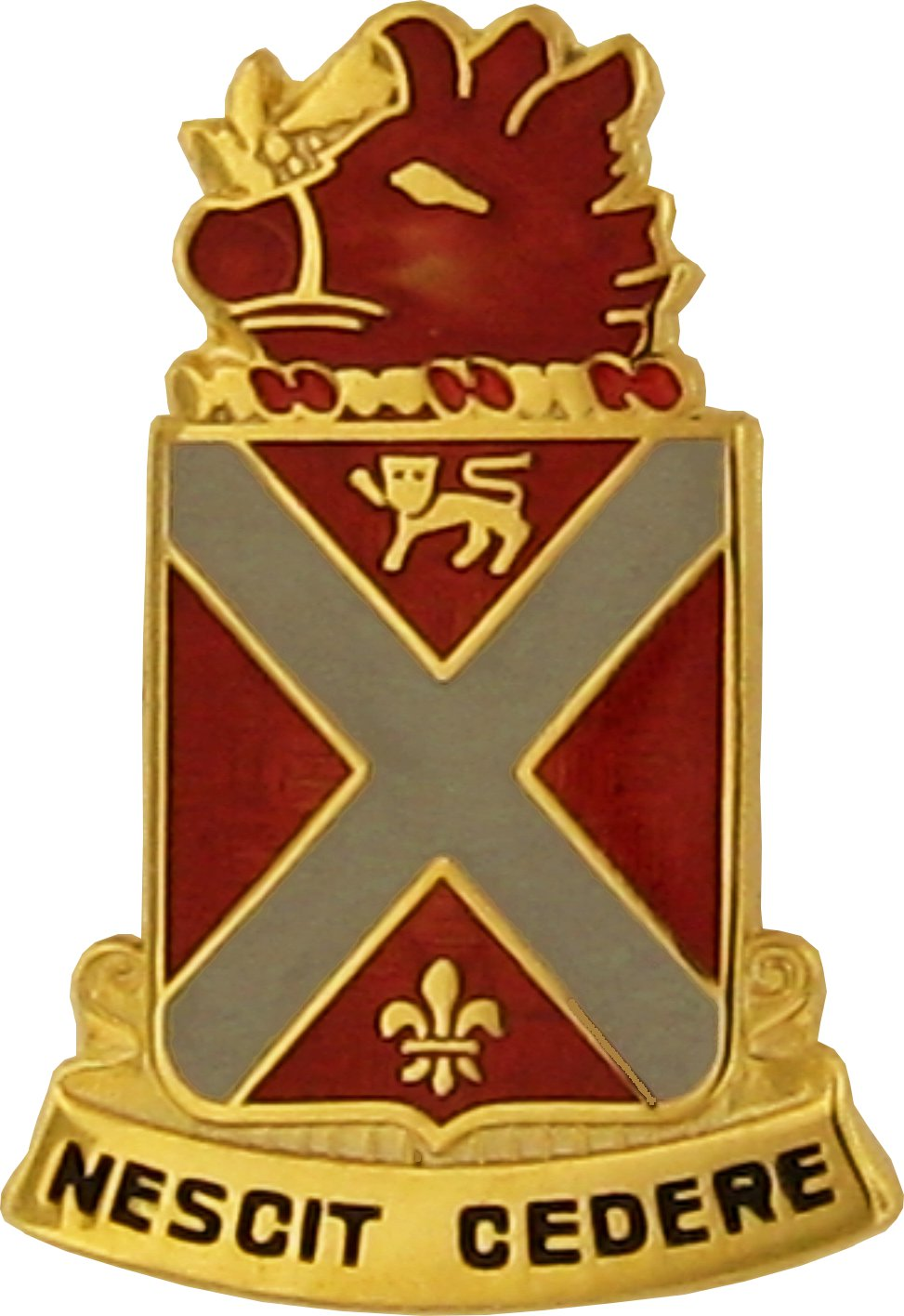
Distinctive Unit Insignia: 118th FA

Revolutionary War Campaigns: Savannah, Georgia 1776, Florida 1778

The 118th Field Artillery traces its origins to four independent volunteer companies, three of foot and one of horse, in the Georgia Militia, District of Savannah, organized on April 18, 1751, following which they were mustered into service at Savannah under the command of Captain Noble Jones. These companies were reorganized as the 1st Regiment of Foot Militia, Division of Savannah, on April 2, 1757.

- In January, 1776, the 1st Regiment of Foot Militia was reorganized to consist of two battalions, with elements from Savannah and Christ Church Parish in the 1st Battalion. The Regiment remained in state service, and did not spin off any units for adoption by the Continental Army. The regiment was disbanded on January 29, 1778, when Savannah surrendered to the British, but was reorganized in 1782 in the Georgia Militia as the 1st Regiment (Savannah and Chatham County in the 1st Battalion), 1st Brigade, 1st Division.

In 1784 the 1st Battalion (Chatham Battalion), 1st Regiment, was expanded, reorganized and redesignated as the 1st Regiment (Chatham Regiment), 1st Brigade, 1st Division, which was reorganized in 1793 to consist of the 1st (or City) Battalion in Savannah and the 2nd (or County) Battalion in Chatham County. Then in 1807 the Chatham Regiment was reorganized wholly in Savannah. Several companies of the Chatham Regiment were mustered into service during the War of 1812.

The Chatham Regiment became the 118th Field Artillery in 1917.

Major General (retired) Donald Burdick, who was Director of the Army National Guard from 1986 to 1991, served as commander of the 118th Field Artillery Brigade from 1981 to 1983.

The scarlet color of the Distinctive Unit Insignia is for Artillery. The lion and fleur-de-lis represent service in the Revolutionary War and World War I, respectively, while the gray saltire represents Confederate service during the Civil War.

== 169th Military Police Company, RI ARNG ==
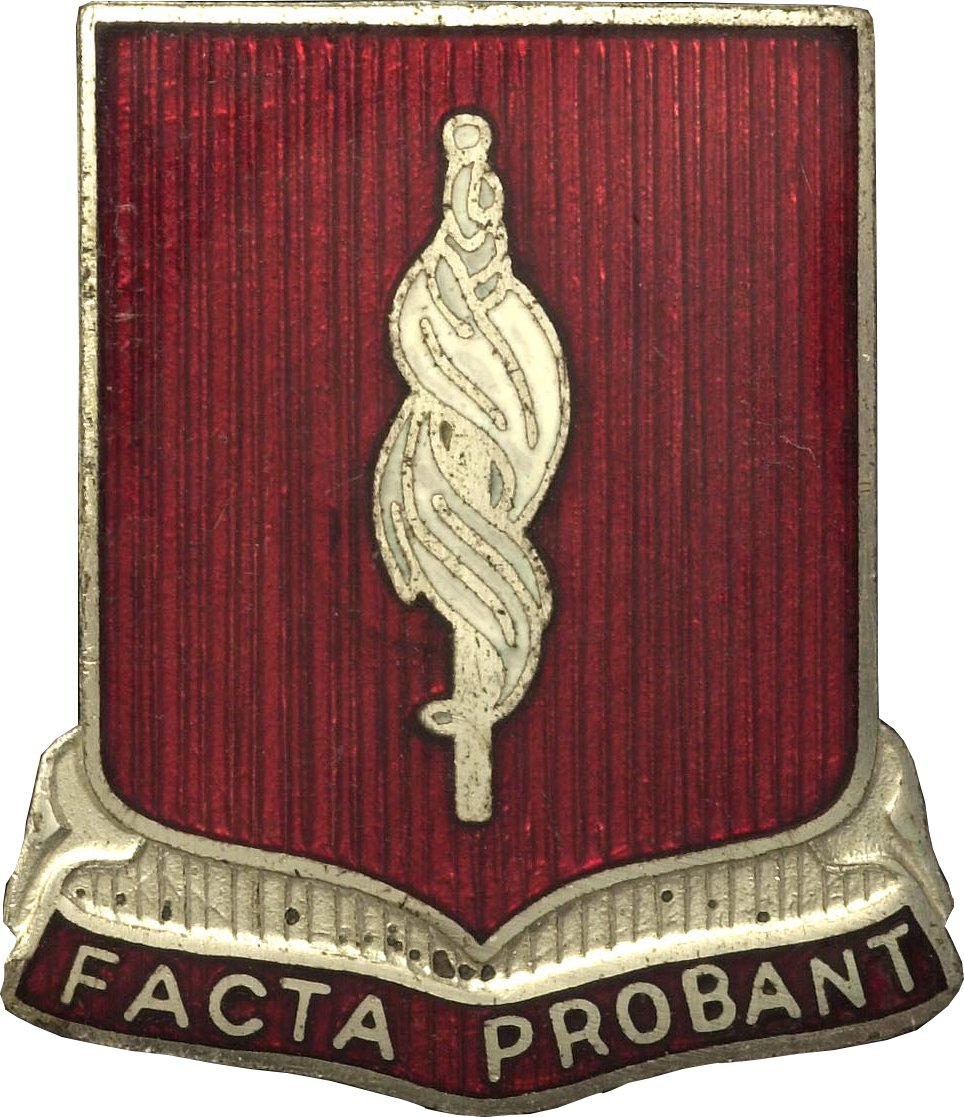
Distinctive Unit Insignia: 118th MP Bn

Revolutionary War Campaigns: Rhode Island 1777, Rhode Island 1778

The 169th Military Police Company traces its roots back to the Artillery Company of Westerly and Charlestown, organized in January 1755. In May, 1758, the Artillery Company of Westerly and Charlestown was redesignated as the Artillery Company of Westerly, Charlestown and Hopkinton.

During the Revolutionary War the company remained in state service, but was mustered into Continental service in 1777 and 1778, during which periods it earned credit for the Rhode Island 1777 and 1778 campaigns.

In 1812 the Artillery Company was redesignated as the Washington Guards, which was mustered into federal service as Captain Coe’s Company of Wood’s State Corps in 1814. From the end of the War of 1812 until early in the twentieth century, the company served as Infantry.

In 1908 Company E, 1st Rhode Island Infantry was converted into a Coast Artillery company. In 1953 it became an Antiaircraft Artillery battery, and in 1962 an Engineer company. It finally became the 169th Military Police Company in 1968.

Since companies are not issued their own separate Distinctive Unit Insignia, soldiers in the 169th MP Company wear the Distinctive Unit Insignia of the 118th MP Battalion, which is displayed above. At the present time the 169th MP Company is one of the two Military Police companies under the command of the 118th MP Battalion.

The 169th MP Company, and its predecessor units, were based in Westerly, Rhode Island, until 1996 when it was re-located to Warren, Rhode Island.

The ancestor units of the 169th MP Company served on active duty during the American Revolution, War of 1812, American Civil War, Spanish-American War, World War I, World War II, Korea and Operation Desert Storm. The 169th MP Company was deployed to Iraq from 2007 to 2008 and to Afghanistan from 2012 to 2013.

== 263rd Army Air and Missile Defense Command, SC ARNG ==
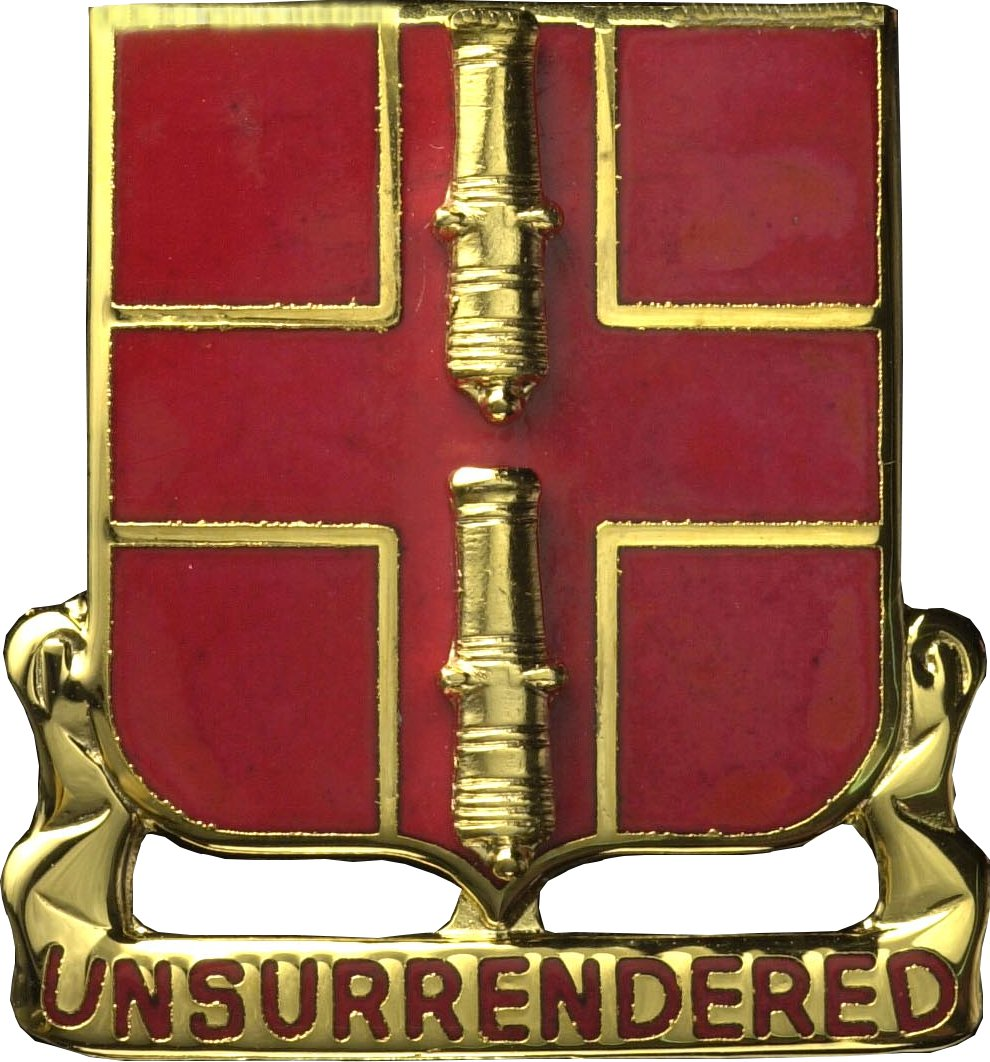
Distinctive Unit Insignia: 263rd ADA

Revolutionary War Campaigns: Charleston, Savannah, South Carolina 1779

The 263rd Army Air and Missile Defense Command traces its roots to the Artillery Company of Charles Town, South Carolina Militia, which was organized in 1756 and chartered by the colony of South Carolina on July 31, 1760. In 1775 the regiment was expanded, reorganized and redesignated as the Charles Town Battalion of Artillery.

- During the Revolutionary War the Charles Town Battalion of Artillery was active in the defense of Charleston and Savannah until May 12, 1780, when it surrendered to the British. The regiment was reconstituted in 1783 as the Charleston Battalion of Artillery, and organized at Charleston.

On December 17, 1794, the Charleston Battalion of Artillery was attached to the 7th Brigade, 2nd Division, South Carolina Militia, and then expanded in 1797 to form the 1st Regiment of Artillery. One battalion of the 1st Regiment was mustered into federal service during the War of 1812.

The unit remained an Artillery unit until 1890 when it became a battalion in the South Carolina Naval Militia, which was called into federal service during World War I for patrol duty with the United States Navy off the coast of South Carolina. By 1925 the unit had become the 263rd Coast Artillery Battalion, which, after many more organizational changes, became the 263rd Air Defense Artillery in 1959.

The red cross of St. George in the Distinctive Unit Insignia symbolizes Revolutionary War service, while the two cannons are trophies of the regiment.

== 133rd Engineer Battalion, ME ARNG ==
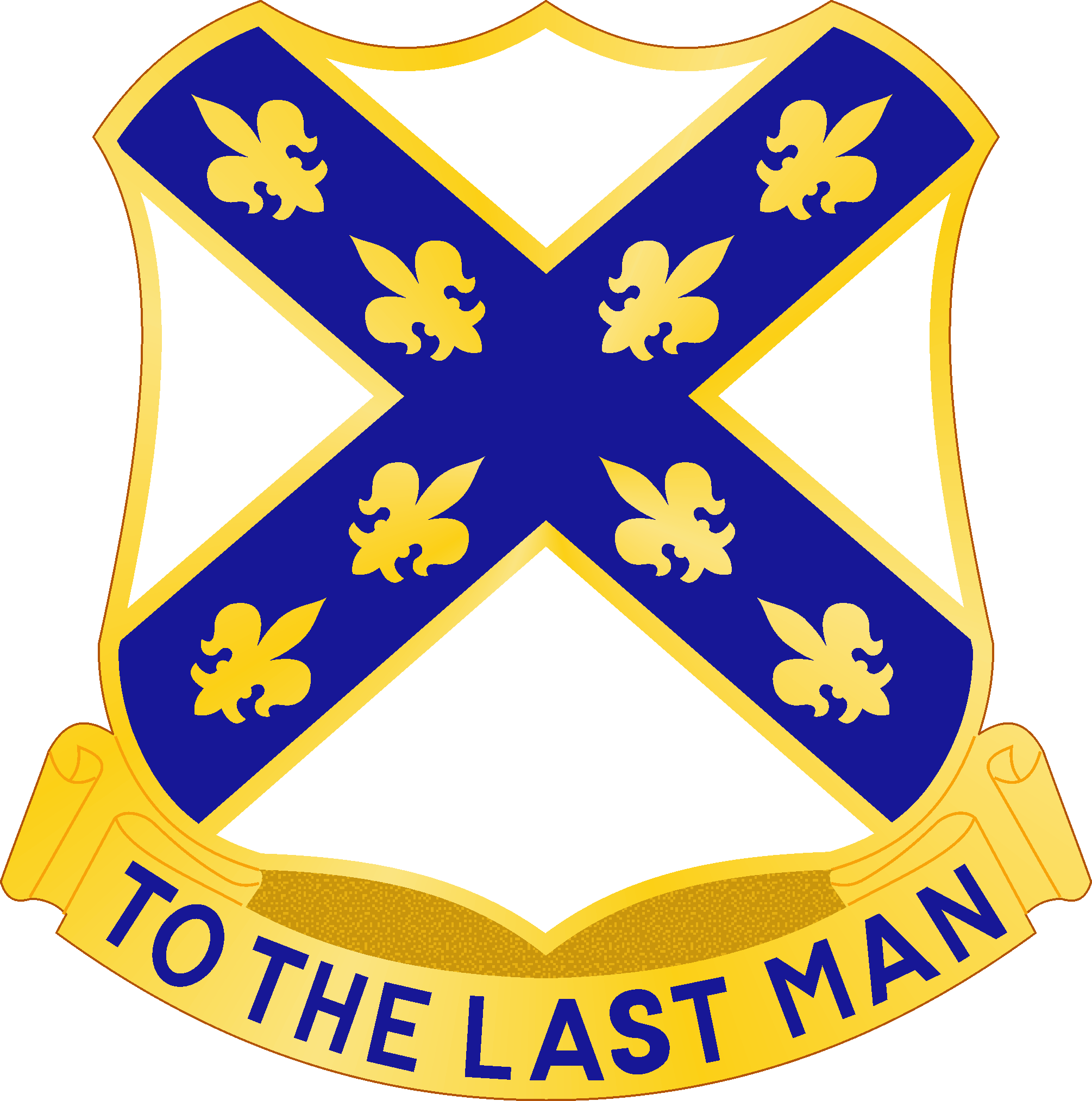
Distinctive Unit Insignia: 133rd Eng Bn

Revolutionary War Campaigns: Boston, Saratoga, Monmouth, New York 1777, Pennsylvania 1777, Massachusetts 1775, Massachusetts 1779

The 133rd Engineer Battalion traces its roots to the Cumberland County Regiment of the Massachusetts Militia which was formed in 1760. The regiment served during the American Revolution from April 1775 to January 1781, when it was variously known as Phinney's Regiment, the 18th Continental Regiment and the 12th Massachusetts Regiment.

The 133rd Engineer Battalion was organized in 1970 from the 20th Armor Regiment, which was a descendant from several other units including the famed 20th Maine Volunteer Infantry Regiment which fought at the Battle of Gettysburg.

The 133rd has 42 campaign streamers, representing service from the American Revolution to the War in Iraq. It has been awarded the Meritorious Unit Commendation and the Philippine Presidential Unit Citation.

The 133rd uses the Distinctive Unit Insignia of the 103rd Infantry Regiment, which is one of its several ancestor units.

== 295th Infantry, PR ARNG ==
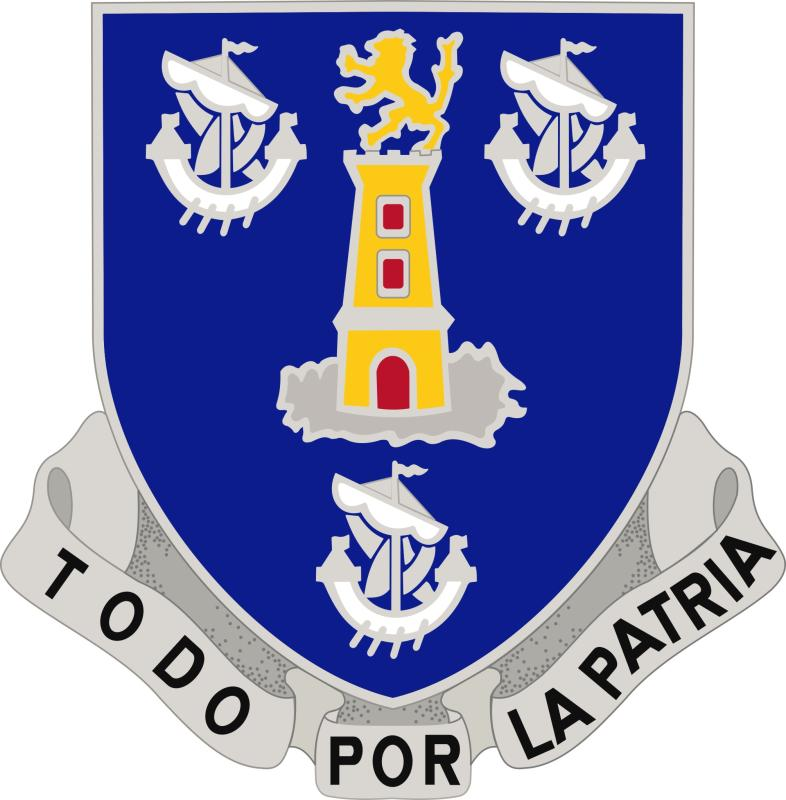
Distinctive Unit Insignia: 295th Inf

Revolutionary War Campaigns: None

The 295th Infantry was an Army National Guard unit with Spanish colonial roots, rather than English ones. It became a unit in the American army after Puerto Rico became an American possession in the aftermath of the War with Spain. The regiment then suffered a series of mobilizations, inactivations, and reorganizations that ultimately dissolved it as a regiment on May 1, 1964. The regiment was simply reorganized as two battalions of the 92nd Infantry Brigade on that date although they maintained their names without an administrative hierarchy as a regiment. Finally, on December 31, 1967, the battalions were reorganized as a single battalion of the 92nd Infantry Brigade.[b] The battalion, however, was eventually allocated to the 101st Troop Command.

Most recently, Company C, 1st Battalion, 295th Infantry Regiment (C/1-295) spent a year running security escort missions throughout southern Iraq and security patrols around Baghdad International Airport as part of Operation Iraqi Freedom in 2006.

== 296th Infantry, PR ARNG (Los Cocorocos) ==
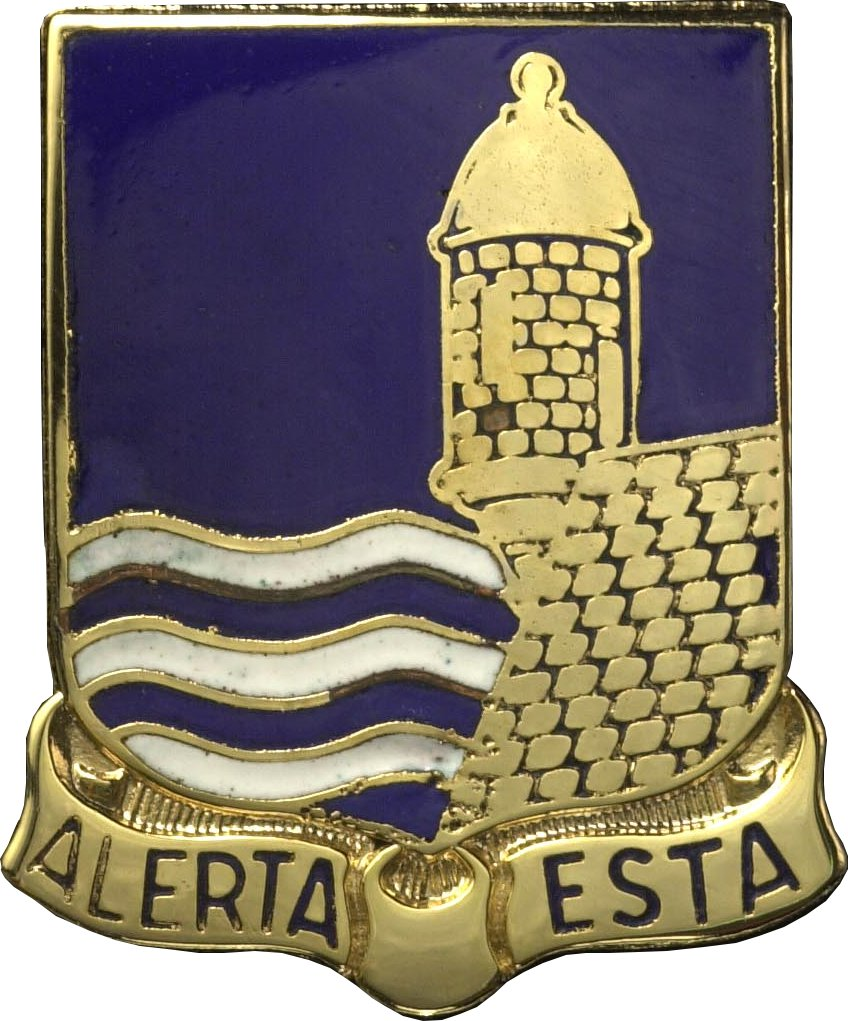
Distinctive Unit Insignia: 296th Inf

Revolutionary War Campaigns: None

The 296th Infantry is an Army National Guard unit with Spanish colonial roots, rather than English ones. It became a unit in the American army after Puerto Rico became an American possession in the aftermath of the War with Spain.

The 296th Infantry Regiment traces its history back to May 17, 1765, when Don Alejandro O’Reilly constituted the Milicias disciplinadas de la Isla de San Juan de Puerto Rico for the kingdom of Spain. The Milicias disciplinadas was organized on June 1, 1765, to consist of nineteen infantry and five cavalry companies.

In 1898, when Puerto Rico was ceded to the United States by the Treaty of Paris ending the War with Spain, the island militia, by then known as the Battalon de voluntaries urbanos de Puerto Rico, was disbanded, only to be reconstituted on April 12, 1917, as an Infantry regiment in the Puerto Rico National Guard. This regiment was designated as the 1st Regiment of Infantry in 1919 and then as the 295th Infantry in 1923. On June 1, 1936, the 1st and 2nd Battalions, 295th Infantry were withdrawn and redesignated as the 1st and 2nd Battalions, 296th Infantry.

There are some people associated with the Puerto Rico National Guard who believe that the lineage of the 296th Infantry Regiment should be extended much further back than 1765. Indeed, some claim that there is an unbroken connection between the 296th Infantry and the militias established on the island by Don Juan Ponce de León in 1510. If the Center of Military History had accepted this claim, then it would have created a bit of a paradox: that the oldest unit in the United States Army would be one derived from a former colony of Spain, a country that was one of England’s, and subsequently America's, chief rivals for control of the New World, rather than one derived from the English militia in one of the original thirteen colonies. The event that caused the Center for Military History to reject such an interpretation was the comprehensive reorganization of the island’s militia implemented by Field Marshal Alejandro O'Reilly in 1765. Alejandro O'Reilly was born in Ireland, but spent much of his life as a mercenary in the Spanish army. After being sent to Puerto Rico by the Spanish King to prepare a comprehensive report on the defenses of San Juan, O'Reilly produced a "General Program of Military Reform", which included plans for both improving the island's fortifications and for revamping the local militias. For his efforts he became known as the "father of the Puerto Rico militia". This comprehensive reorganization of the island's militia was judged to constitute a definitive disconnection between the militia units that existed before the reorganization and those that were organized afterwards.

The wavy base in the Distinctive Unit Insignia represents the sea, while the bastion with the sentry box represents the Infantry on the island of Puerto Rico. The blue color of the shield is also indicative of service as Infantry.

== Troop A/1st Squadron/104th Cavalry, PA ARNG (First Troop, Philadelphia City Cavalry) ==
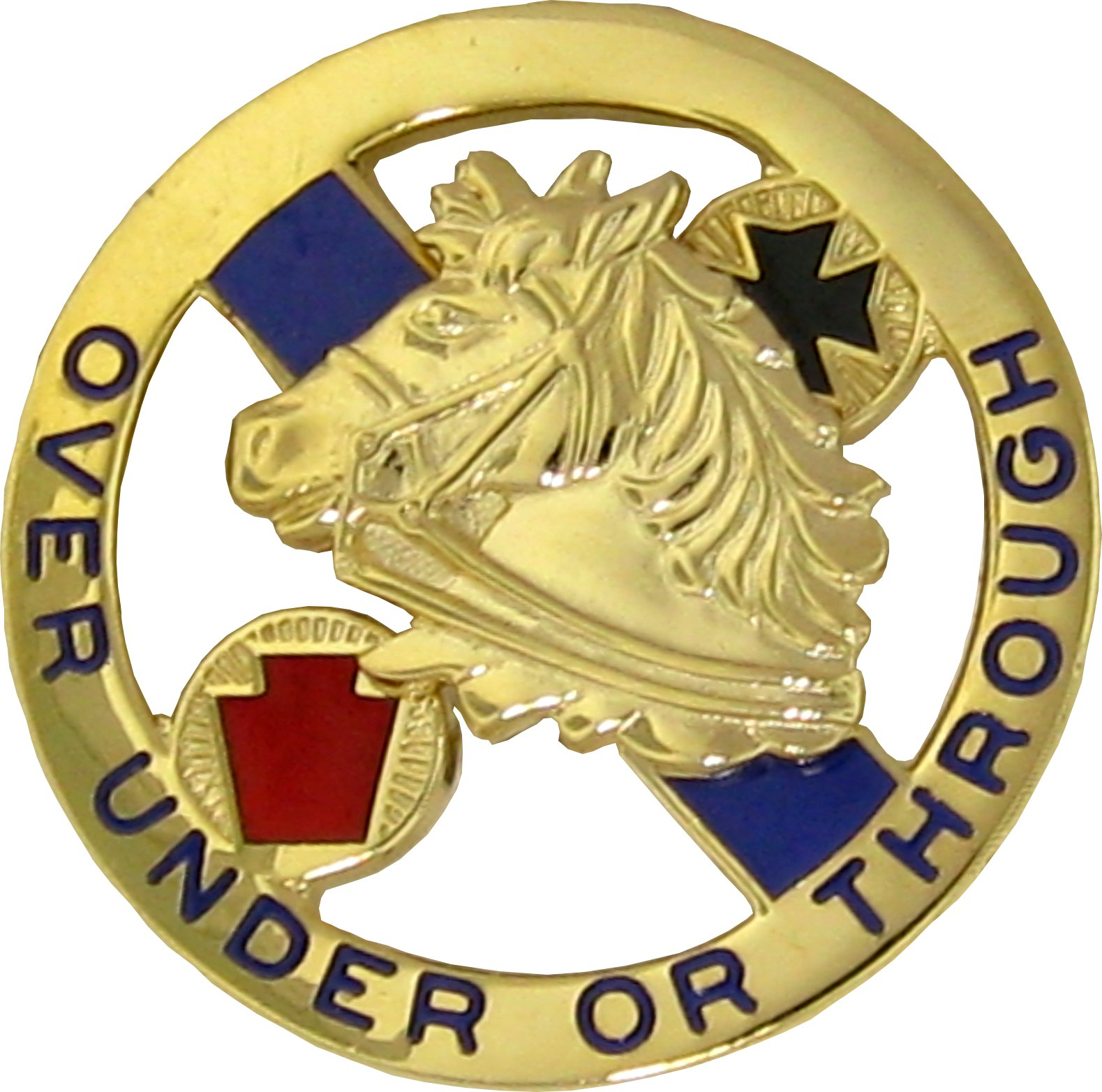
Distinctive Unit Insignia: 104th Cav

Revolutionary War Campaigns: Trenton, Princeton, Brandywine, Germantown

The 104th Cavalry traces its lineage back only as far as 1874 when the 8th Infantry Regiment was constituted on June 30, 1874, and organized in south-central Pennsylvania on August 4, 1874. However, Troop A, 1st Squadron, 104th Cavalry, can trace its origins all the way back to the Associators of the Light Horse of the City of Philadelphia, which was organized on November 17, 1774.

Most of the members of the Philadelphia Light Horse were prominent members of many of Philadelphia’s elite social organizations, including the Schuylkill Fishing Company, the Schuylkill Company of Fort St. Davids, the St. Andrew’s Society of Philadelphia, the Society of Friendly Sons of St. Patrick, the Sons of St. George and the Gloucester Fox Hunting Club. Indeed, the short dark brown coats, faced and lined with white, and the “round black hats bound with silver cord and buck’s tail” worn by the Troopers during the Revolutionary War were similar to the hunting coats and caps worn by club members during fox hunts.

The first notable action of the Associators of the Light Horse during the Revolutionary War was to escort General Washington from Philadelphia to Kingsbridge, New York, on his way to take command of the Continental Army outside of Boston in 1775. At other times the Troop was called upon to bear dispatches for the Committee of Safety and to march with money being delivered to the Army.

- The unit served at various times during the Revolutionary War, earning credit for the Trenton, Princeton, Brandywine and Germantown campaigns. At the Battle of Trenton, the Troop crossed the Delaware with Washington and served as the rearguard as the Americans crossed back over the Delaware after the battle, while during the Battle of Princeton, it performed reconnaissance, participated in the counterattack against the British during the climax of the battle, and at the end of the battle served as a rearguard as Washington withdrew the Army to Morristown.

In 1794 the Light Horse of the City of Philadelphia was redesignated as the First Troop, Philadelphia City Cavalry. In that same year the unit was called into service by President Washington to suppress the Whiskey Rebellion, an uprising of farmers in western Pennsylvania challenging the collection of a federal excise tax on whiskey. The Whiskey Rebellion was the first grassroots challenge to the authority of the new national government to enforce federal laws.

The Troop was also mustered into federal service during the War of 1812, although they were not awarded any streamers for their service. Following the defeat of the American forces at Bladensburg, Maryland, and the subsequent occupation of Washington by the British, the Troop provided mounted sentinels to monitor the movements of British ships on Chesapeake Bay and the Delaware River that might be heading for Philadelphia.

Cavalry service is indicated in the Distinctive Unit Insignia by the horse's head and by the yellow in the shield; Infantry service, by the blue band. The black Maltese cross represents service in Puerto Rico, while the red keystone is the insignia of the 28th Infantry Division, in which elements of the regiment have served.

== 175th Infantry, MD ARNG (Fifth Maryland) ==
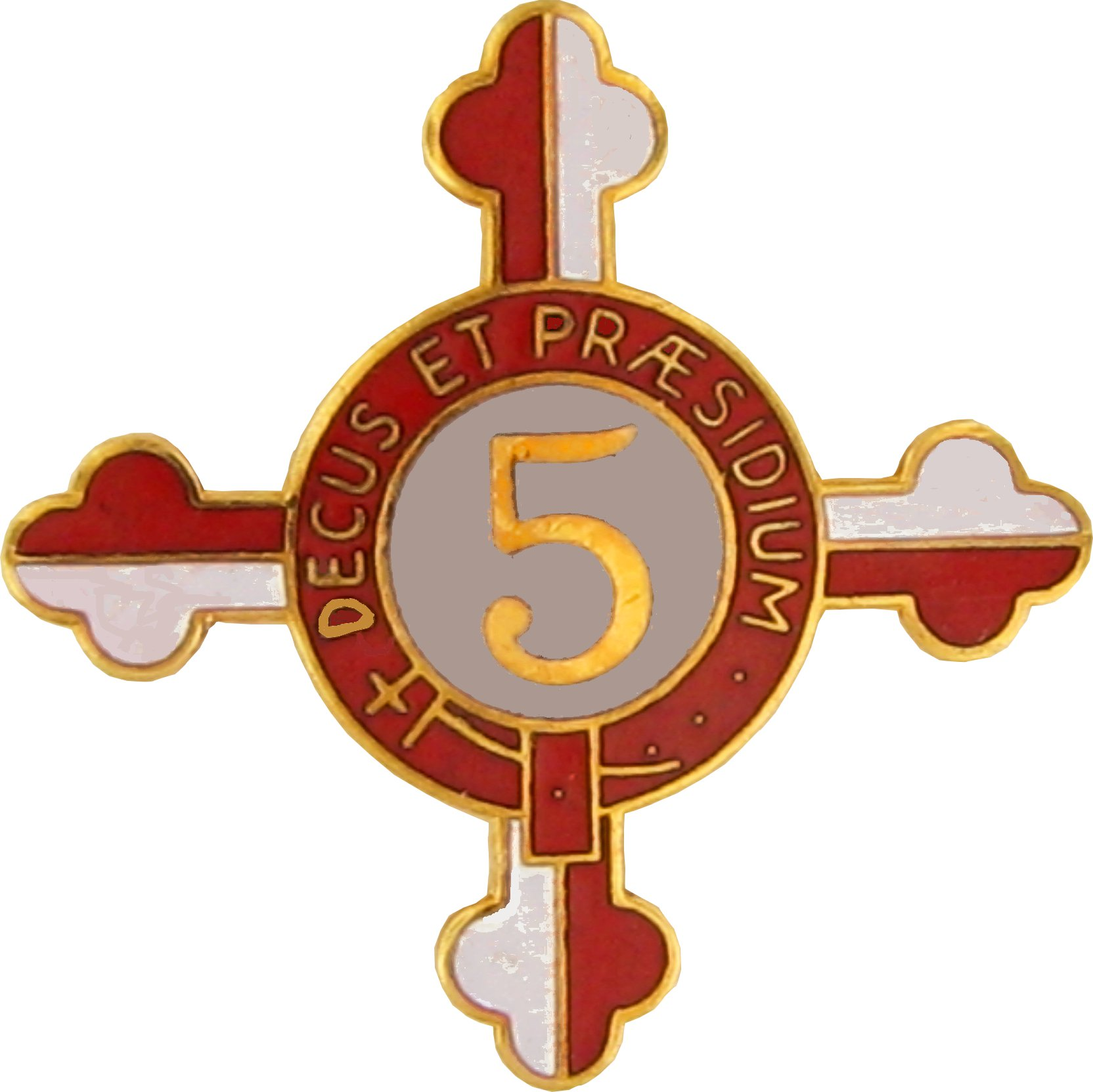
Distinctive Unit Insignia: 175th Inf

Revolutionary War Campaigns: Long Island, Trenton, Princeton, Brandywine, Germantown, Monmouth, Yorktown, Cowpens, Guilford Court House, New York 1776, New York 1777, South Carolina 1780, South Carolina 1781, South Carolina 1782, North Carolina 1781

The 175th Infantry had its origins in the Baltimore Independent Cadets, a company of sixty “gentlemen of honour, family, and fortune,” organized on December 3, 1774. On 14 January 1776 the Baltimore Independent Cadets were absorbed into William Smallwood’s Maryland Battalion (or Regiment) and seven attached independent companies.

- After being adopted by the Continental Army in August 1776, Smallwood’s Maryland Battalion was expanded and reorganized as the 1st, 2nd, 3rd, 4th, 5th, 6th and 7th Maryland Regiments. These seven regiments underwent reorganization in 1781 to form the 1st–5th Maryland Regiments, in 1782 to form the 1st–4th Maryland Regiments, and in 1783 to form the 1st and 2nd Maryland Regiments. Smallwood's Maryland Continental troops distinguished themselves during the Battles of Long Island and White Plains.

In 1794 during a reorganization of the Maryland Militia, the volunteer militia companies of Baltimore were organized as elements of the 5th Regiment of Militia, later designated as the 5th Regiment of Volunteer Infantry. The regiment was mustered into federal service during the War of 1812.

On 1 January 1, 1941, the 5th Regiment of Infantry was redesignated as the 175th Infantry.

The Distinctive Unit Insignia has the design of the Crossland Arms, Alicia Crossland having been the mother of George Calvert, the first Baron of Baltimore. The “5” refers to the regiment’s designation as the 5th Regiment of Militia in 1794. The red color of the annulet is symbolic of the red uniforms of the Baltimore Independent Cadets, while the gray field represents Confederate service during the Civil War.

== 112th Field Artillery Regiment "First New Jersey Artillery" ==
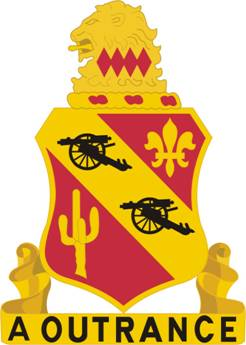
Distinctive Unit Insignia: 112th FA

Revolutionary War Campaigns: Battle of Trenton 1776; Battle of Princeton 1776, Battle of Monmouth,1778

The 112th Field Artillery Regiment was organized 3 April 1917 in the New Jersey National Guard from new and existing units as the 1st Battalion, Field Artillery, with Headquarters at Camden. However its lineage goes back to 2 formations formed in March 1776: Eastern Division of New Jersey Artillery [Colonel Thomas Proctor's Regiment of Artillery of the Continental Army] and the Western Division of New Jersey Artillery; both units served in the American Revolution. After 141 years of separation it wasn't until 1916 that both formations were re-united in one unit: Battery B [Western] Battery C [Eastern] with the 112th Field Artillery Regiment

== 109th Field Artillery, PA ARNG (Wyoming Valley Guards) ==
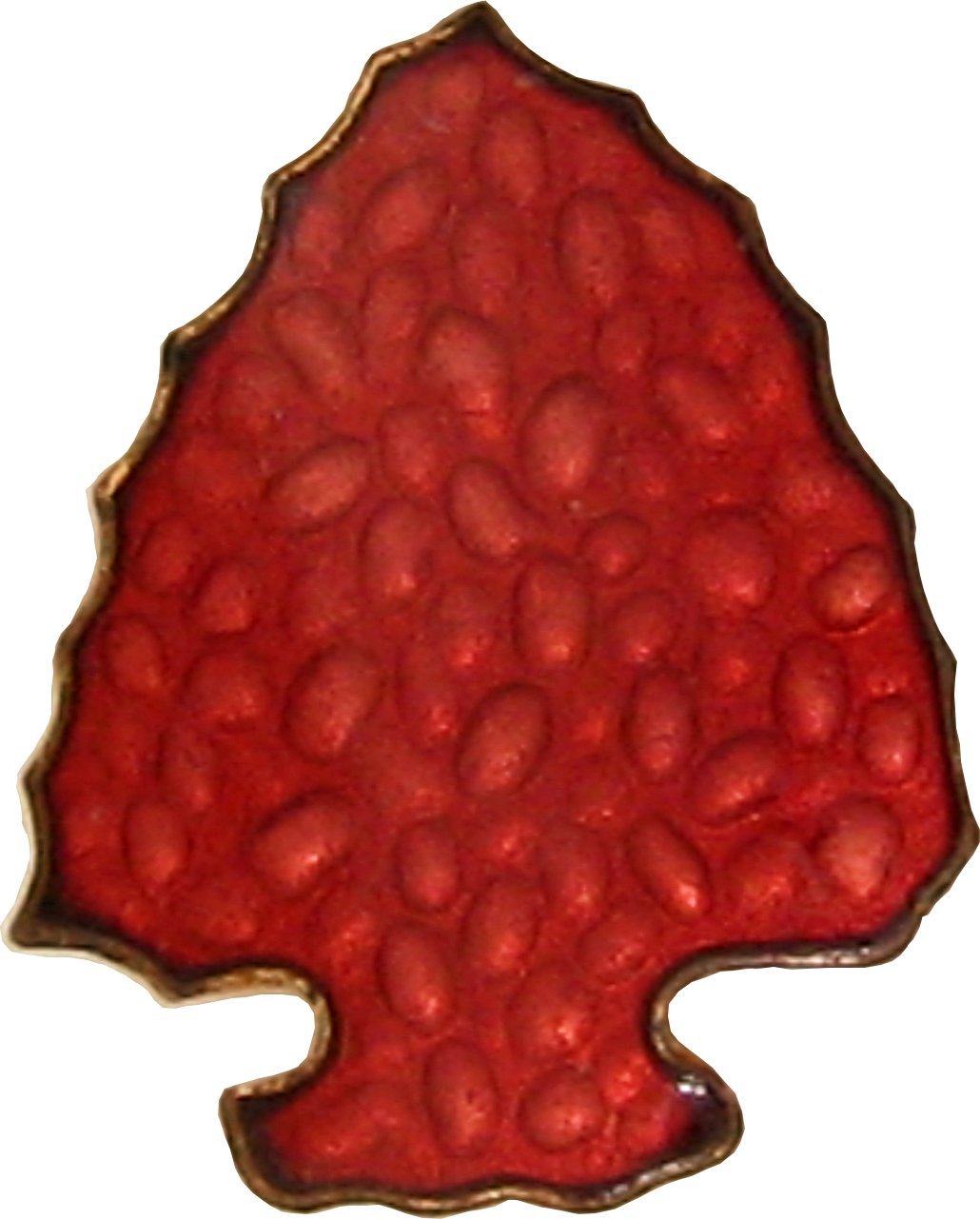
Distinctive Unit Insignia: 109th FA

Revolutionary War Campaigns: Brandywine, Germantown, New Jersey 1777, Pennsylvania 1777, Pennsylvania 1778, Pennsylvania 1779, New York 1779

The 109th Field Artillery traces its origins to the 24th Regiment, Connecticut Militia, constituted on May 11, 1775, and organized on October 17, 1775, in the Wyoming River Valley, a twenty-five-mile stretch along the North Branch of the Susquehanna River in an area of present-day Pennsylvania that was claimed by Connecticut in 1775.

King Charles II had granted the land to Connecticut in 1663, but also to William Penn in 1681. Contention over which colony held title to the Wyoming Valley led to an outbreak of armed skirmishes, referred to as the First Yankee-Pennamite War, in 1769. Supporters of Pennsylvania’s claims were called Pennamites. In December, 1775, personnel from the 24th Regiment, Connecticut Militia, participated in one such skirmish against some Pennamites at Rampart Rocks. During the Revolutionary War, an uneasy truce prevailed between the two groups of settlers. In 1782 the Wyoming Valley was awarded to Pennsylvania, rekindling the animosity, and triggered some fighting (the Second Yankee-Pennamite War) between the pro-Connecticut and pro-Pennsylvania factions. This dispute was not fully resolved until 1799, when the Pennsylvania legislature settled the land claims of the Connecticut claimants.

- During the Revolutionary War the 24th Regiment, Connecticut Militia, earned credit for the Pennsylvania Campaigns of 1777, 1778 and 1779, in addition to campaigns with the Main Army in New Jersey and eastern Pennsylvania. The Pennsylvania campaigns involved a number of actions in the Wyoming Valley against the Iroquois, who were allies of the British and Tory Loyalists. The Wyoming Valley was an important source of grain and other agricultural products for the Continental Army. The 24th Regiment was present at the Battle of Wyoming on July 3, 1778. In this encounter a force of approximately seven hundred Iroquois, British Regulars and Tory Rangers from Fort Niagara attacked and defeated a smaller militia force at a location north of Wilkes-Barre. Between three and four hundred American militiamen and settlers were killed in the battle and the massacre that followed. Following the surrender of the American forces the Indians continued to terrorize the Valley, resulting in its near complete abandonment by mid-July. During the summer of 1779, an American expedition that included the 24th Regiment, Connecticut Militia, successfully drove the Indians out of the Valley.

On November 13, 1787, the militia units in the region were redesignated as Hollenbeck’s Battalion, Luzerne County, Pennsylvania Militia. In 1793 Hollenbeck’s Battalion was redesignated as the 3rd Regiment, Luzerne County, which, in 1799, was redesignated as the 35th Regiment.

After numerous reorganizations during the nineteenth and early twentieth centuries, the Wyoming Valley Guards became the 109th Field Artillery in 1917.

The Distinctive Unit Insignia, in the shape of an arrowhead, commemorates service in conflicts with the Indians.

== Company A/1st Battalion/69th Infantry, NY ARNG (Fighting 69th) ==
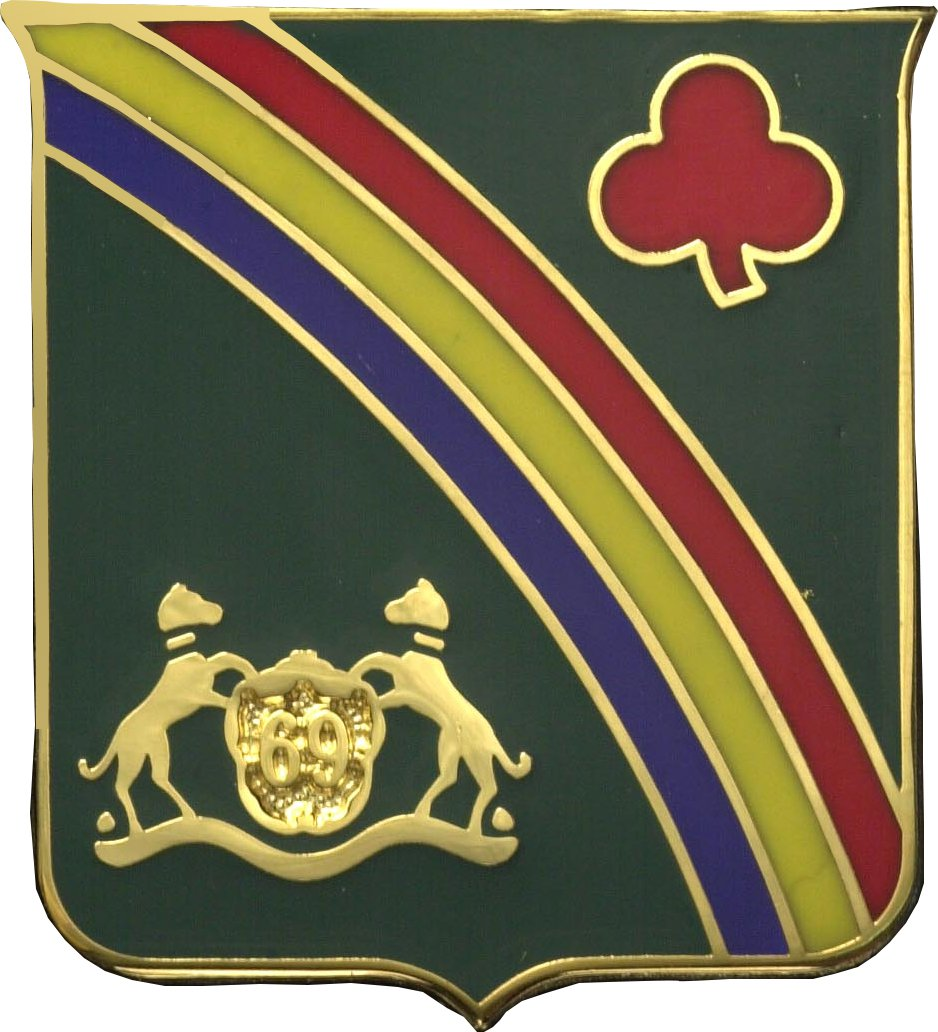
Distinctive Unit Insignia: 69th Inf

Revolutionary War Campaigns: Quebec

The 69th Infantry traces its lineage back to December 21, 1849, when the 1st Irish Regiment was formed in New York from new and existing companies composed of Irish immigrants. However, Company A, 1st Battalion, 69th Infantry, can trace its origins all the way back to the 8th Company, 1st New York Regiment, which was authorized on May 25, 1775, and organized June 28–August 4, 1775, in New York City.

- During the Revolutionary War the 1st New York Regiment participated in the unsuccessful invasion of Canada, an offensive undertaken with the goal of driving the English out of Quebec and inducing Francophone Canada to join the American rebellion against Great Britain.

Between 1776 and 1858 the 8th Company, 1st New York Regiment, underwent numerous reorganizations, with its lineage passing in 1786 to Captain Van Wagenen’s Company, 3d Regiment of Infantry, in 1800 to the 6th Company, 6th Regiment of Infantry, and on January 22, 1858, to Company B, 9th Regiment. The 9th Regiment had been created in 1850 by the redesignation of the 1st Irish Regiment. In May, 1858, the 9th Regiment was consolidated with the 69th Regiment (organized October 12, 1851, in New York as the 2nd Irish Regiment), with the new regiment retaining the designation as the 69th Regiment.

Civil War service is indicated in the Distinctive Unit Insignia by the red trefoil, which was the insignia of the 1st Division, 2nd Corps, in which the regiment served. The rainbow is the insignia of the 42nd Division, indicating service in that division in France during World War I. The black “69” on an oval shield supported by two Irish wolfhounds has been a symbol of the regiment since its founding. The green of the shield is the old facing color of the regiment.

== HD/1109th Aviation Group, CT ARNG ==
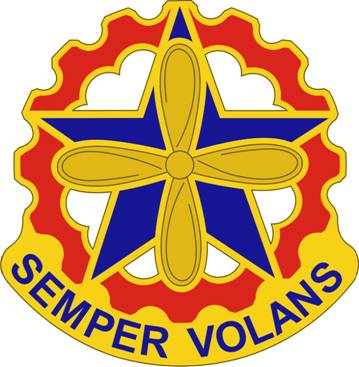
Distinctive Unit Insignia: 1109th Avn Gp

Revolutionary War Campaigns: New York 1776, Rhode Island 1777, Connecticut 1781

The Headquarters Detachment, 1109th Aviation Group traces its lineage back to the Norwich Light Infantry, Connecticut Militia, organized in May 1775 as an element of the 20th Regiment and commanded by Captain Christopher Leffingwell.

- The Norwich Light Infantry was part of the Main Army that fought unsuccessfully for the control of New York City in 1776. Thereafter it served in Rhode Island and Connecticut.

In 1847 the Norwich Light Infantry was converted to Artillery Company A, 3rd Regiment, Connecticut Volunteer Militia, and mustered into federal service during the Civil war as Company C, 3rd Connecticut Volunteer Infantry. After service during the first half of the twentieth century as a Coast Artillery, Field Artillery or Antiaircraft Artillery unit, it became Company B, 162nd Transportation Battalion in 1959. By 1979, after a series of additional reorganizations, the 162nd Transportation had become the Headquarters Detachment, 1109th Aviation Classification Repair Activity Depot (AVCRAD). In 2007 the Headquarters Detachment, 1109th AVCRAD was reorganized and redesignated as Headquarters Detachment, 1109th Aviation Group.

The gear wheel in the Distinctive Unit Insignia indicates the maintenance function of TASMG, while the cloud is symbolic of the sky and aviation.

== Battery B and C/3rd Battalion/197th Field Artillery, NH ARNG (Stratford Guards, Dover) ==
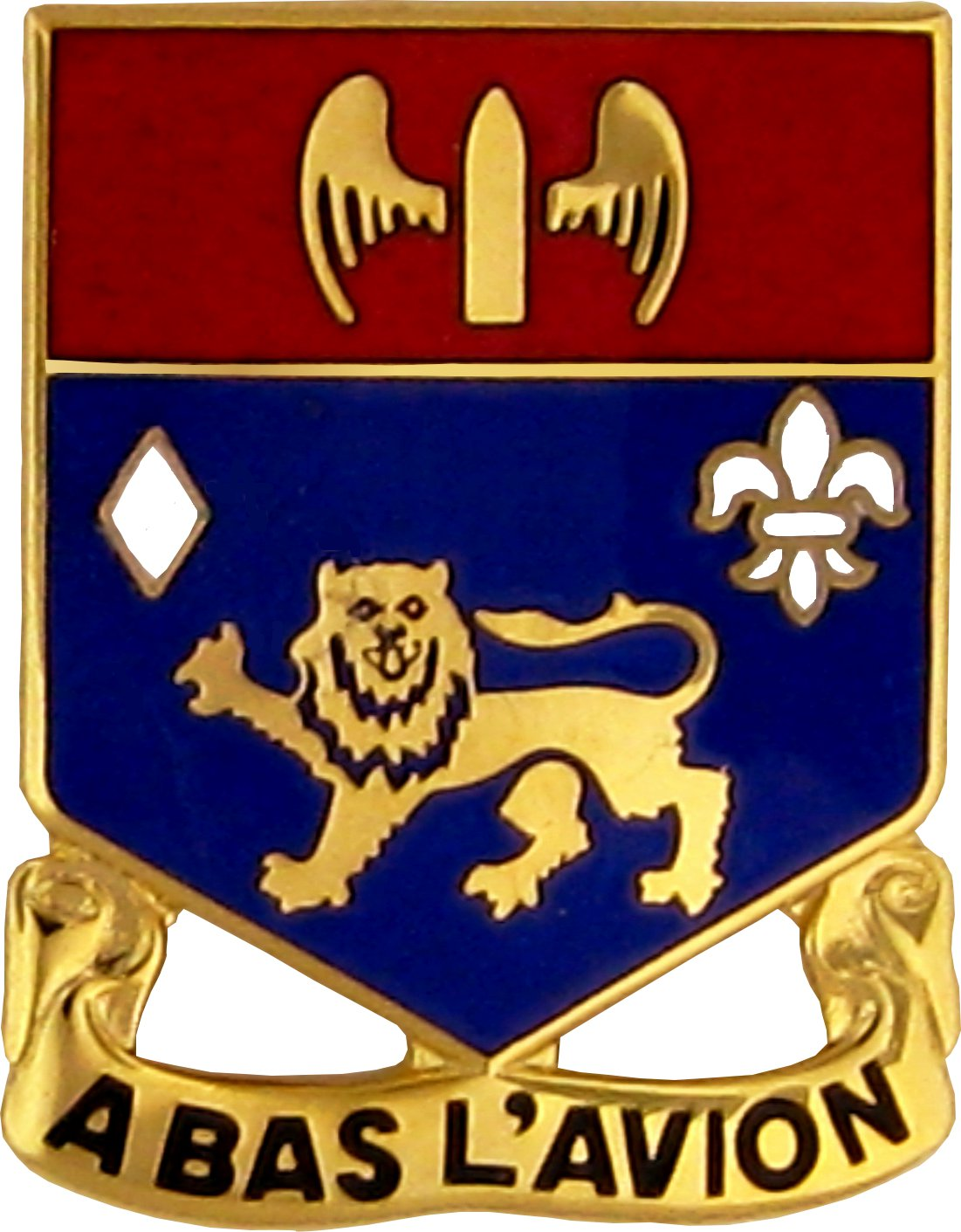
Distinctive Unit Insignia: 197th FA

Revolutionary War Campaigns: Boston

The 197th Field Artillery traces its lineage back only to April–October 1861 when the 1st, 2nd, 3rd, 4th and 5th New Hampshire Volunteer Infantry Regiments were organized from existing volunteer militia companies and mustered into federal service in the Civil War. Battery B, 3rd Battalion 197th Field Artillery goes back to Minute Company of Dover, New Hampshire Militia of 1775. Battery C, 1st Battalion, 197 Field Artillery, can trace its origin all the way back to Captain Waldron’s Minute Company, 2nd New Hampshire Regiment, which was organized on July 3, 1775.

- The 2nd New Hampshire Regiment was mustered into service with the New England Army in December 1775 and earned credit for the Boston campaign. Following its service in Boston, Captain Waldron’s Company resumed its status as a company in the 2nd Regiment, New Hampshire Militia.

Between 1776 and 1917 the New Hampshire Militia underwent numerous redesignations, leading ultimately to the formation of the 172nd Field Artillery, with headquarters in Manchester, and the 197th Artillery (Coast Artillery), with headquarters in Concord. After still more reorganizations, the 197th Artillery (Coast Artillery) became the 197th Field Artillery in 1972. During all of these reorganizations the lineage of Captain Waldron's Minute Company was perpetuated by Battery C, 1st Battalion, 172nd Field Artillery. But in September 2008, the 172nd and 197th Field Artillery Regiments were consolidated, with the resulting unit designated as the 197th Field Artillery. During this consolidation Battery C, 1st Battalion, 172nd Field Artillery, was consolidated with Battery C, 3rd Battalion, 197th Field Artillery, so today the lineage of Captain Waldron's Company resides in Battery, 3rd Battalion, 197th Field Artillery.

The shield of the Distinctive Unit Insignia is blue to indicate the early service of the unit as Infantry. The gold lion is for service in the War of 1812; the white lozenge–the corps badge for the 2nd Division, 3rd Corps, during the Civil War–represents Civil War service; and the fleur-de-lis, service during World War I. The chief is red for Artillery and the winged projectile indicates service as an Antiaircraft Artillery unit.

== HHD/104th Military Police Battalion, NY ARNG (Poughkeepsie Invincibles) ==
=== 1156th Engineer Company (Vertical), NYARNG (First New York) ===
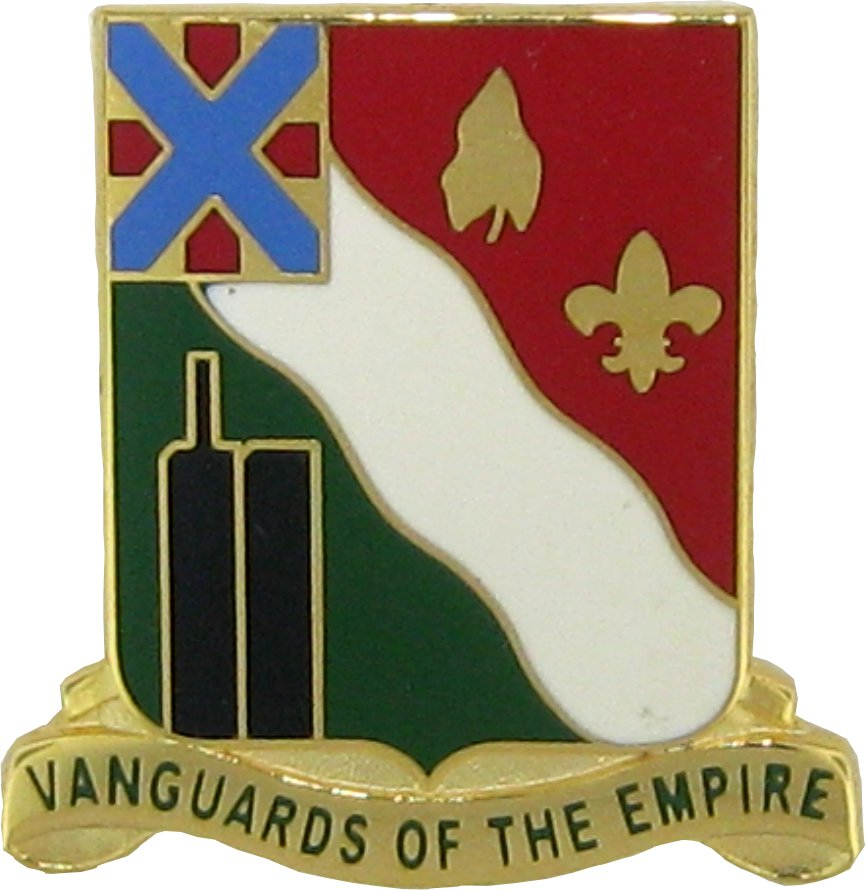
Distinctive Unit Insignia: 104th MP Bn

Revolutionary War Campaigns: New York 1776, New York 1777

The Headquarters and Headquarters Detachment, 104th Military Police Battalion, was formed on September 1, 2004, by the consolidation of three batteries from the 1st Battalion, 156th Field Artillery–the Headquarters Battery, Battery A and Battery B–two of which trace their origins to units formed during the American Revolution.

The 1156th Engineer Company was co-created by consolidating one battery - Headquarters - of the 1/156 FA and Charlie Company of the 204th Engineer Battalion. Headquarters Battery out of Kingston, NY traces its lineage back a hundred years before the Revolutionary War.

Battery A, 1st Battalion, 156th Field Artillery, traces its origins to Captain Jacobus Frear's Company (Poughkeepsie Invincibles), 4th Regiment, Duchess County Militia, organized October 17, 1775, in Poughkeepsie, while the Headquarters Battery, 1st Battalion traces its lineage to Captain Hendrick Schoonmaker's Company, Ulster County Militia, Colonel Johannes Snyder's 1st Regiment, organized in the New York Militia in Kingston. Battery B is more recent, tracing its history to the Service Battery, 1st Battalion, 156th Field Artillery organized in 1941.

- Colonel Snyder's 1st Regiment was mustered into service in late 1776, and was also present at the Battle of Forts Clinton and Montgomery in the highlands of the Hudson River Valley in 1777.

Captain Freer's Company was redesignated as the 4th Company, Colonel John Freer's Regiment, in 1786, and as 4th Company, 84th Regiment of Infantry, in 1812. The Poughkeepsie Invincible eventually became Battery A, 1st Battalion, 156th Field Artillery, in 1972.

Captain Schoonmaker's Company was redesignated as a company in Colonel Jacob Bruyn's Regiment, Ulster County Militia, in 1786, and as the 131st Regiment in 1812. Schoonmaker's Company eventually became the Headquarters Battery, 1st Battalion, 156th Field Artillery, in 1986.

The red portion of the Distinctive Unit Insignia represents the unit’s role as a Field Artillery battalion during World War II and the Global War on Terrorism, while the green portion of the shield represents its current status as a Military Police unit. The taro leaf represents Spanish–American War service in Hawaii, while the fleur-de-lis is for World War I and II service in France. The black silhouette of the Twin Towers honors the unit’s service members that served in the towers at the time of the September 11 attack, and also those battalion members deployed to New York City to perform security at the site. This is the first Distinctive Unit Insignia to incorporate symbolism representing a role in the response to the attack on the Trade Center. The red cross of St. George and the blue saltire in the canton represent the Revolutionary War and Civil War service of the two batteries that go back to the colonial era. The Distinctive Unit Insignia is a modification of the insignia of the 156th Field Artillery.

== 113th Infantry, NJ ARNG (First New Jersey) ==
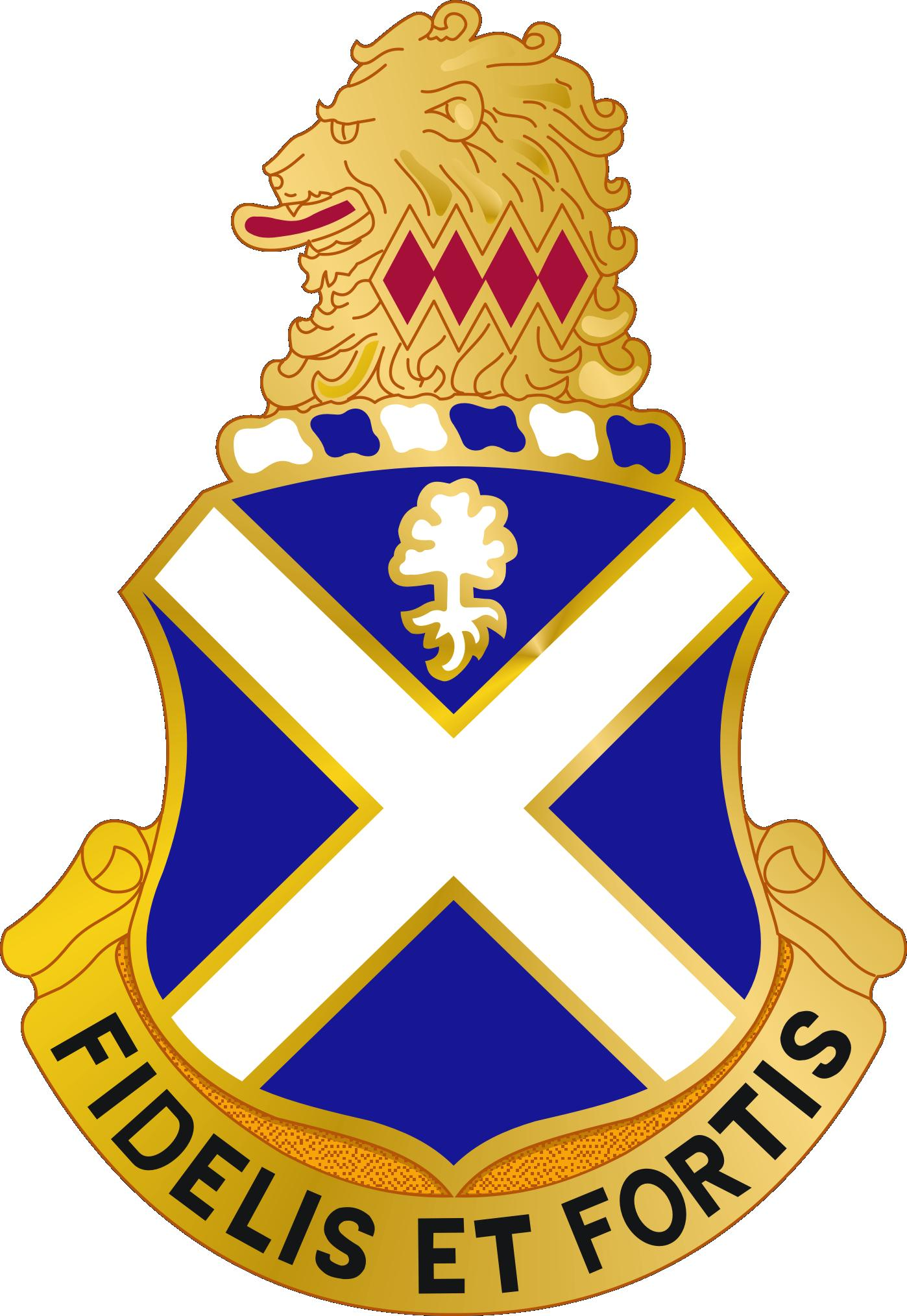
Distinctive Unit Insignia: 113th Inf

Revolutionary War Campaigns: Brandywine, Germantown, Monmouth, Yorktown, Canada 1776, New York 1776, New York 1777, New York 1779, New Jersey 1777, New Jersey 1780

There are claims that the lineage of the 113th Infantry goes all the way back to militia elements from northern New Jersey (Essex, Hudson, Bergen, and Passaic counties) that existed in 1664, and that these elements were organized into the First New Jersey Regiment in 1673, but this claim is not accepted by the Center of Military History, which is the final arbiter in conflicting lineage claims. According to the Lineage and Honors issued in 2000 by the Center of Military History, the 113th Infantry traces its lineage back to the 1st New Jersey Regiment, organized in the Continental Army during the period October 26–December 15, 1775, from existing militia units in Essex County.

- The 1st New Jersey Regiment was initially assigned in April 1776 to Stirling's Brigade, an element in the Main Army, and then almost immediately reassigned to the Canadian Department. In July 1776 it was transferred to Stark's Brigade, and subsequently St. Clair's Brigade, in the Northern Department. In late 1776 it returned to the Main Army, being assigned to the New Jersey Brigade in May 1777.

In 1783 the 1st New Jersey Regiment was redesignated as the New Jersey Regiment.

Following the war the regiment was disbanded, but was reconstituted in 1793 as the Essex Brigade, elements of which were mustered into federal service during the War of 1812. After numerous reorganizations over the next hundred years, the First New Jersey became the 113th Infantry in 1921.

The settlement of New Jersey by the English and Dutch is commemorated in the Distinctive Unit Insignia by the lion, which is from the coats of arms of both England and Holland, and by the set of four red lozenges, which is from the coat of arms of the English Proprietors. Proprietors were favorites of the Crown who were granted large tracts of land in the New World to supervise and develop. The white saltire represents service of the 1st Regiment, New Jersey Brigade, in the Civil War. The oak tree represents service in World War I.

== Company A/2nd Battalion/19th Special Forces Group, RI ARNG ==
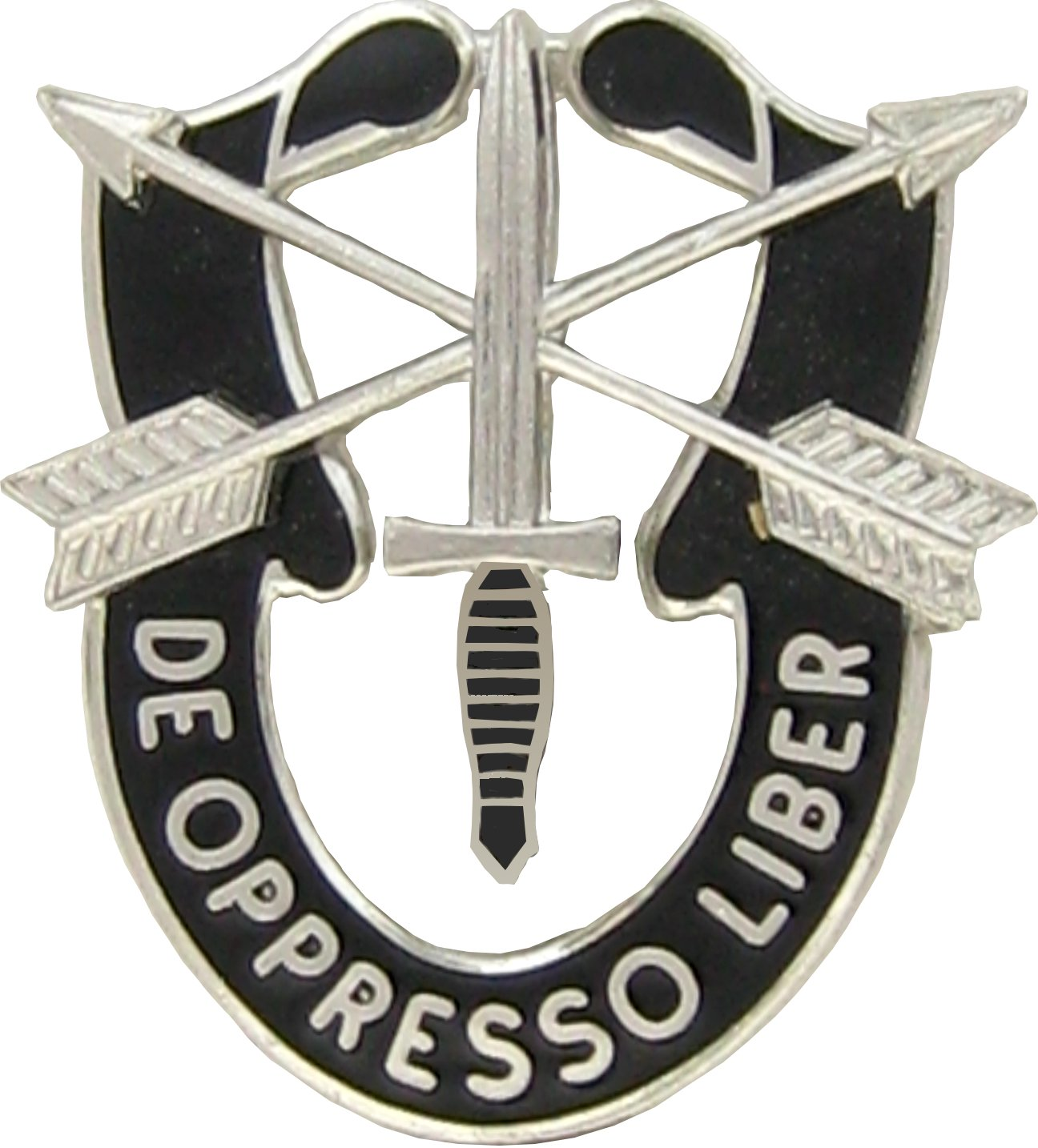
Distinctive Unit Insignia: 1st Special Forces Regiment

Revolutionary War Campaigns: Rhode Island 1777, Rhode Island 1778

Company A, 2nd Battalion, 19th Special Forces, traces its lineage back to the North Providence Rangers, organized and chartered on December 5, 1775, in North Providence and Smithfield. During the Revolutionary War, the North Providence Rangers remained in state service as a militia unit, but additionally formed the 2nd Company (Captain Gideon Westcott commanding), Rhode Island State Artillery Regiment.

- The 2nd Company, Rhode Island State Artillery Regiment was mustered into state service on December 23, 1776, at Providence and disbanded on June 1, 1780.

The North Providence Rangers were also mustered into state service during the War of 1812 as Captain John Wood’s Company, Wood’s State Corps, at Fort Adams, Rhode Island. In 1824 the North Providence Rangers were rechartered as the Fayette Rifle Corps, and in 1857 as the Pawtucket Light Guard.

After service as Infantry during most of the nineteenth century, and as Coast Artillery or Antiaircraft Artillery during the first half of the twentieth century, the North Providence Rangers became a Special Forces company in 1962. It became Company A, 2nd Battalion, 19th Special Forces Group, in 1979. Company A's armory is currently located in Middletown, Rhode Island.

All Special Forces soldiers wear the Distinctive Unit Insignia of the 1st Special Forces Regiment. The insignia combines the crest and shield of the 1st Special Service Force of World War II, which was activated in 1942 at Fort Harrison, Montana, and disbanded in France in 1945, then reconstituted again in 1960 as the 1st Special Forces Regiment under the Combat Arms Regimental System.

== 198th Signal Battalion, DE ARNG (First Delaware) ==
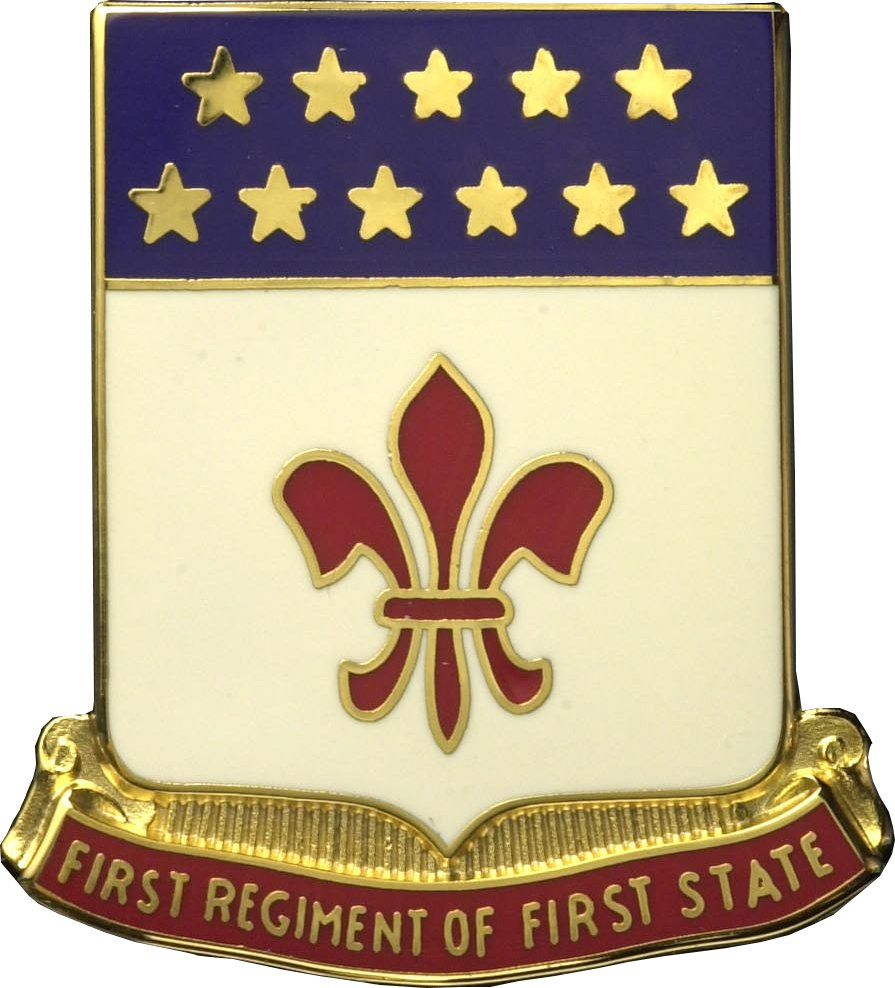
Distinctive Unit Insignia: 198th Sig Bn

Revolutionary War Campaigns: Long Island, Trenton, Princeton, Brandywine, Germantown, Monmouth, Yorktown, Cowpens, Guilford Court House, New York 1776, New York 1777, South Carolina 1780, South Carolina 1781, South Carolina 1782, North Carolina 1781

The 198th Signal Battalion has descended from the Delaware Regiment, constituted in the Continental Army on December 9, 1775, and organized during January–March 1776 as Colonel John Haslet’s Regiment.

- The regiment was reorganized as Colonel David Hall’s Regiment between December 12, 1776, and March 1, 1777. Its most noteworthy action was at the Battle of Cowpens in January 1781, where a British force of 1,100 Regulars suffered over 800 casualties in a battle against 300 Continentals and 700 militia from North and South Carolina, Virginia and Georgia.

Following the Revolutionary War, the companies of the Delaware Regiment were reorganized as the Light Infantry, 1st Regiment, the Artillery Company, 2nd Brigade, and the 1st Company, Light Infantry, 8th Regiment, all three of which were mustered into service for the War of 1812.

For the rest of the eighteenth century and until the end of World War I in the twentieth century, the 1st Delaware served primarily as Infantry. Following World War I it became a Coast Artillery unit; during World War II and for a while thereafter, an Antiaircraft Artillery unit; and finally in 1970 it was reorganized as the 198th Signal Battalion.

The shield of the Distinctive Unit Insignia is white, the old color of Infantry. The eleven mullets represent the eleven battles and campaigns in which the organization served during the Civil War, and the red fleur-de-lis is for World War I service. Red is also the color of the Coast Artillery. The Distinctive Unit Insignia was originally approved for the 198th Coast Artillery and later redesignated for the 736th Antiaircraft Artillery Gun Battalion. It became the Distinctive Unit Insignia of the 198th Signal Battalion on October 19, 1978.

== 1st Battalion/5th Field Artillery, US Army (Alexander Hamilton Battery) ==
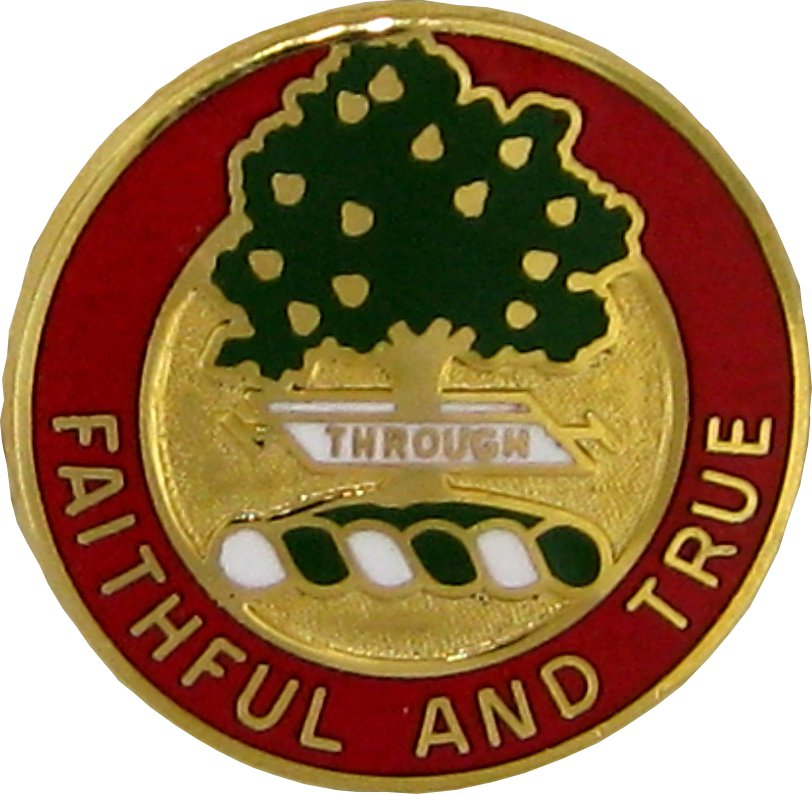
Distinctive Unit Insignia: 5th FA

Revolutionary War Campaigns: Long Island, Trenton, Princeton, Brandywine, Germantown, Monmouth, Yorktown, New York 1776, New Jersey 1776, New Jersey 1777, New Jersey 1780

Although the 5th Field Artillery can only claim roots that go back to 1907 when the regiment was constituted from new and existing units at Fort Leavenworth, Kansas, the 1st Battalion, 5th Field Artillery, traces its roots to the New York Provincial Company of Artillery, constituted January 6, 1776, and commanded by Captain Alexander Hamilton. Hamilton was twenty-one years old at the time. The company was organized in February–March 1776 in New York City. The 1st Battalion, 5th Field Artillery, is the oldest unit in the active United States Army and the only one to have credit for participation in the Revolutionary War.

- A year later, in March 1777, Hamilton's Company was transferred to the Continental Army as Captain John Doughty’s Company, Colonel John Lamb’s (New York) Continental Artillery Regiment. It was reorganized and redesignated in 1779 as the 2nd Company, 2nd Continental Artillery Regiment.

On July 12, 1776, a battery of the New York Provincial Company of Artillery at Fort George at the southern tip of Manhattan Island is believed to have fired the first artillery rounds following the signing and first publication of the Declaration of Independence on July 4, 1776, when it fired on two British ships entering New York Harbor and sailing up the North River. The location of this event has been known as “The Battery” ever since. The 1st Battalion, 5th Field Artillery, also claims the honor of having fired the last rounds of the Revolutionary War when Captain Doughty’s Company fired a 13-gun salute from the same location at the tip of Manhattan as the British withdrew from Fort George, and the American flag was raised over the fort.

Hamilton's Battery played a particularly significant role in the Long Island campaign, when it covered the successful withdrawal of Washington’s army across the East River to Brooklyn Heights. Hamilton’s Battery was also in the force that crossed the Delaware River on the night of December 25–26, 1776 to launch a surprise attack on British forces near Trenton, an action that resulted in the capture of an entire regiment of Hessians and gave the Americans their first significant victory in the war following a series of defeats in the Battles of Brooklyn, Kips Bay, White Plains, Fort Washington and Fort Lee, broken only by the victory at Harlem Heights, and during the discouraging retreat across New Jersey.

The 1st Battalion, 5th Field Artillery, is not only the oldest unit in the active US Army, but there was also a short period of time when its precursor, Captain Doughty’s Company, was the only unit in the US Army. The Revolutionary War had hardly ended before a strong sentiment grew against the maintenance of a permanent professional peacetime army, and in 1784 Congress instructed President Washington to “discharge the troops now in the service of the United States, except twenty-five privates to guard the stores at Fort Pitt and fifty-five to guard the stores at West Point and other magazines.” The fifty-five artillerists at West Point were the remnants of Captain Doughty’s Company and were still commanded by Brevet Major Doughty, so until the First American Regiment was organized in 1785, Doughty’s Company of Artillery was the only officially constituted and organized formation in the United States Army. In July 1785 Captain Doughty’s Company became the 1st Company, Artillery, 1st American Regiment.

The next action of the 1st Company of Artillery was in the Miami Campaign (1790–1795), an Indian War that was an addendum to the American Revolution. Neither the Revolutionary War nor the Treaty of Paris that ended the war dealt with the contentious issue of American expansion into the Old Northwest (the future states of Ohio, Indiana, Illinois, Michigan and Wisconsin). American expansion was fiercely resisted by Native tribes, which were encouraged and supported by the British, and in 1790 President Washington sent an American expedition into the Northwest to establish American military dominance in the area. The expedition was a disastrous failure. On November 4, 1791, a force under the command of Major General Arthur St. Clair, which included the 1st Company of Artillery, encamped near the headwaters of the Wabash River in the Northwest Territory, near the location of present-day Fort Recovery, Ohio, and was virtually destroyed by a force of Indians led by Little Turtle, Blue Jacket and Tecumseh. Of the 1,669 soldiers in St. Clair's army, 871 were killed or wounded, a casualty rate of over fifty percent. It is believed that the Indians lost fewer than a hundred.

Following the battle, the remnants of the 1st Company, Battalion of Artillery. were consolidated with another battery and redesignated as Captain Mahlon Ford’s Company of Artillery of the 1st Sublegion, Legion of the United States, and placed under the command of Brigadier General Anthony Wayne. In 1793 Wayne led a force back into the area to reassert American power. The culminating action of this campaign occurred on August 10, 1794, at the Battle of Fallen Timbers at a location south of present-day Toledo. The battle resulted in a resounding victory for Wayne’s forces. In the Treaty of Greenville that ended the Northwest Indian War, signed in August 1795, the Indian tribes ceded to the United States much of what is today the State of Ohio, plus the future site of Chicago and the area around Fort Detroit.

The Distinctive Unit Insignia of the 5th Field Artillery is the crest of the Hamilton family.

== 131st Military Police Company, SC ARNG ==
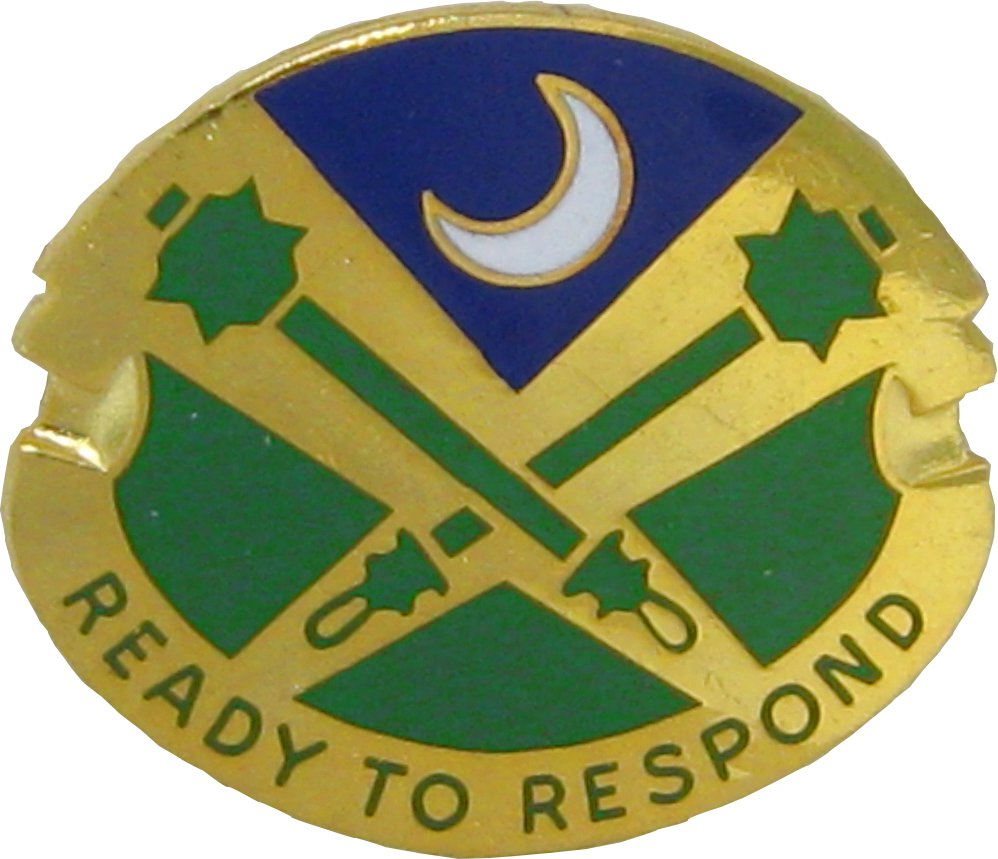
Distinctive Unit Insignia: 51st MP Bn

Revolutionary War Campaigns: Charleston, Savannah, South Carolina 1779

The 131st Military Police Company traces its lineage back to the Beaufort Independent Company of Artillery, formed on February 11, 1776.

- This company earned Revolutionary War credit while serving in the 4th South Carolina Artillery Regiment. It was present at the Battle of Beaufort, the defense of Savannah and the Siege of Charleston. It was forced to surrender in 1780 when the British captured Charleston.

For the next hundred years the Beaufort Independent Company was an Artillery unit in the South Carolina Militia. In 1878 it was reorganized as Naval Militia, and served through World War I by providing replacement personnel for the Navy. In 1921 it became part of the 263rd Coast Artillery (see 263rd Air Defense Artillery above) and remained a Coast Artillery unit until 1949. From 1949 until 1971 it underwent numerous reorganizations and redesignations, finally becoming Troop B, 713th Cavalry, in 1971 and Troop B, 202nd Cavalry, in 1991. In September 2008, Troop B, 202nd Cavalry, was reorganized and redesignated as the 131st Military Police Company.

Since Distinctive Unit Insignia are not issued to companies, soldiers in the 131st Military Police Company wear the insignia of the higher echelon unit in which it serves, which is the 51st Military Police Battalion.

== Headquarters, District of Columbia National Guard ==
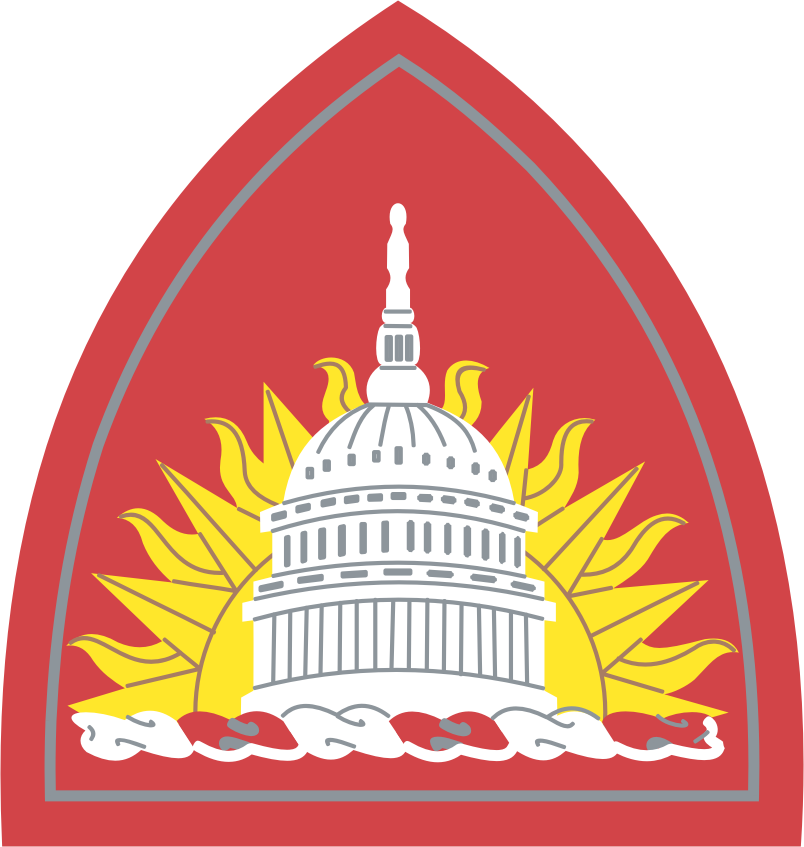
District of Columbia National Guard Distinctive Unit Insignia

Trenton; Princeton;

The District of Columbia National Guard traces its lineage to January 1776 as Headquarters 25th Battalion, Georgetown and Headquarters 29th Battalion, Bladensburg in the Maryland Militia before the District of Columbia was created. These initial units were mobilized in March and July 1776 to repel marauders. Mobilized January 1777 for services at Trenton and Princeton, and in October 1777 for combat service in Germantown.

In April 1781, the 25th Battalion remobilized for defense of the Potomac River Valley, and in May 1781 for defense of Georgetown. The unit saw further service at Fredericktown and Old Fort Frederick through 1781.

The Act of December 1793 reconstituted the 29th Battalion and officially recognized it on 18 June 1794 as the 14th and 18th Regiments, Maryland Militia, and Headquarters 4th Brigade, Maryland Militia, with headquarters in Georgetown. The units were established as Headquarters, District of Columbia Militia by Act of the Congress in March 1802, and organized during May and June 1802 as a Brigade Headquarters. Reorganized by Act of the Congress 3 March 1803.

== 150th Cavalry, WV ARNG (Second West Virginia) ==
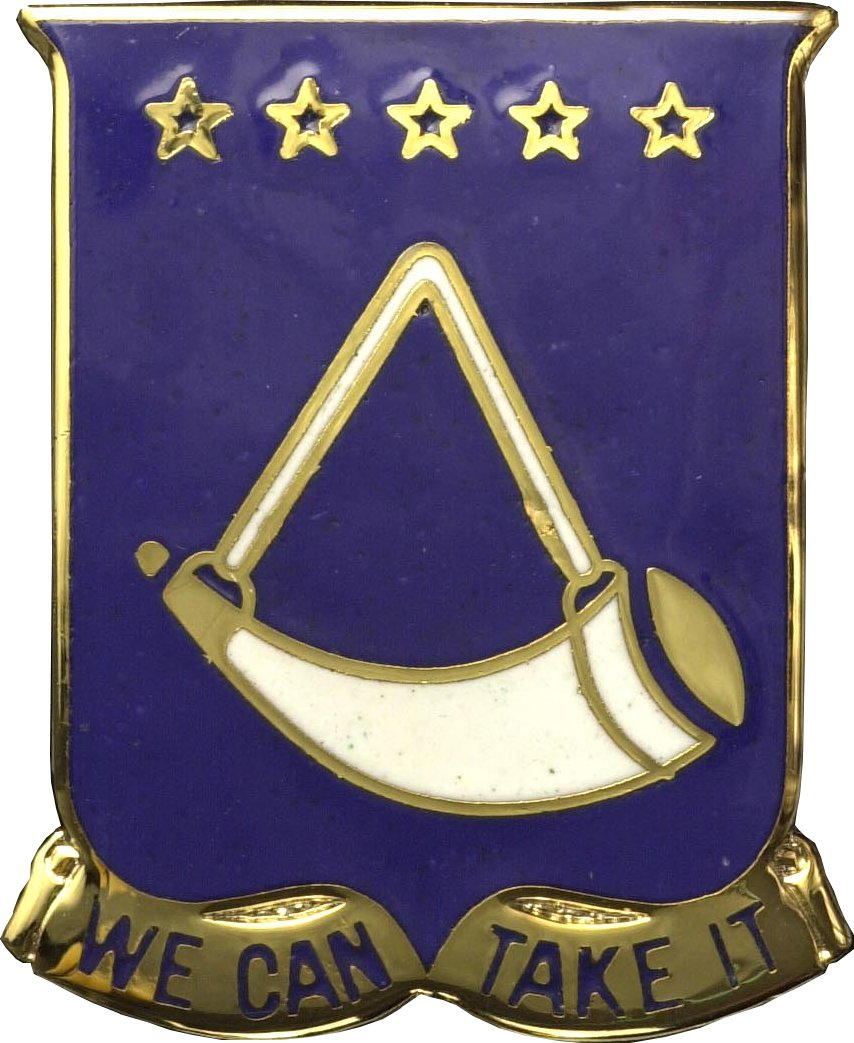
Distinctive Unit Insignia: 150th Cav

Revolutionary War Campaigns: Streamer without inscription

The 150th Cavalry traces its origins to the Militia of Greenbrier County, Virginia, constituted on March 1, 1778. The Greenbrier County Militia included minuteman companies organized in 1777 for frontier defense in western Virginia.

- In addition, the Greenbrier County Militia provided drafts for Virginia regiments of the Continental Army during the period 1778–1782.

In the decade following the Revolutionary War, there were a number of conflicts between settlers from Virginia moving into areas west of the Appalachians in what is now Kentucky and Native American tribes resisting American westward expansion. Three companies from the Greenbrier Militia were involved in these conflicts: Captain William Clendennin's Ranger Company (in state service during 1788), Captain John Morris's Ranger Company (mustered into federal service, May 1–September 30, 1791, and March 15, 1792–January 1, 1793), and Captain John Caperton's Ranger Company (in state service during 1793).

The Greenbrier Militia was reorganized as volunteer companies in the 13th Brigade, Virginia Militia, on December 22, 1792. After many reorganizations during the nineteenth century, the Greenbrier Militia was reorganized in 1889 as companies in the 2nd Regiment, West Virginia National Guard, which became the 2nd Infantry Regiment, West Virginia National Guard, in 1899. In 1917, it became the 150th Infantry, and the 150th Cavalry in 2005.

The powder horn in the Distinctive Unit Insignia is from the coat of arms of the State of West Virginia. The five stars represent five wars in which the regiment has participated, but there has been some confusion concerning which five wars these stars should represent. When the Distinctive Unit Insignia was first issued in 1934, the regiment was credited with participation in the American Revolution, the War of 1812, the Mexican War, the Civil War and World War I. But in 1950 credit for participation in the Mexican War was withdrawn. However, by 1950 the 150th Infantry had been awarded credit for service in the American Theater during World War II and, therefore, was still entitled to credit for participation in five wars, thus precluding any need to issue a redesigned Distinctive Unit Insignia.

== See also ==
- List of Regular Army units with campaign credit for the War of 1812
- List of Army National Guard units with campaign credit for the War of 1812
- Early U.S. Artillery formations

== Footnotes ==
Dates of origin and organizational history before and after the Revolutionary War were obtained from the Lineage and Honors Certificate issued for each unit by the United States Army Center of Military History, Department of the Army, located at Fort Lesley J. McNair, Washington, DC. A few of these Lineage and Honors Certificates are available on the Center for Military History website, in which case a link is provided.
