= Octavia Williams Bates =

American suffragist, clubwoman (1846–1911)

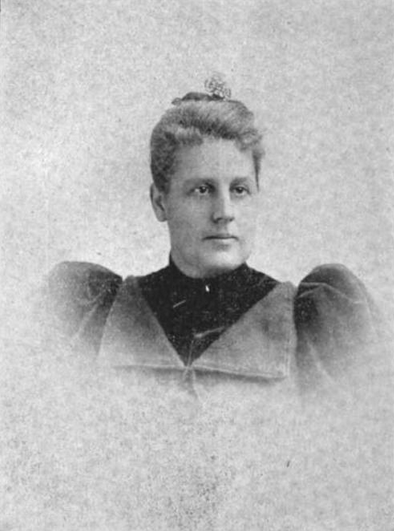
- Born: 1846; Detroit, Michigan, U.S.
- Died: January 12, 1911 (aged 64–65); Baltimore, Maryland, U.S.
- Education: University of Michigan
- Occupations: Suffragist, Clubwoman, Author

Octavia Williams Bates (1846 – January 12, 1911) was an American suffragist, clubwoman, and author of the long nineteenth century. She was involved with women's movements associated with higher education and political enfranchisement. Bates was probably officially connected with more societies looking to these ends than any other woman of her time in Michigan, if not in the U.S. She traveled in various parts of the U.S. and Canada, and was specially interested in the woman suffrage movement. In 1899, after attending a conference in Baltimore, Maryland, Bates was so attracted to the city that she made it her permanent home.

== Early life and education ==
Octavia Williams Bates was born in Detroit, Michigan, 1846. Her parents were Samuel Gersham Bates and Rebecca (Williams) Bates, of that city. Her great-grandfather, Nathan Bucknam, volunteered in Capt. Naylor Hatch's company, Col. Thomas Gardner's regiment, and was with this colonel, who fell at Battle of Bunker Hill. He was at the siege of Boston and re-enlisted in 1776 for further service.

Bates was educated in the public schools of Detroit and was a graduate of the Detroit High School. She entered the University of Michigan in the fall of 1873 and graduated from the Literary Department with the class of 1877. In speaking of her college experience, she said:— "When I entered the University, as the higher education of women was still in its experimental stage, I anticipated a great deal that would be difficult and hard to bear; but having determined to secure a thorough education I nerved myself to endure all things to attain that end."

In the summer of 1894, Bates determined to enter the Law department of the University of Michigan and did so with the class of 1896. She believed that a legal education would enable her to care for her property in a more intelligent manner and to carry on her work for women with greater effectiveness. She was immediately elected vice-president of her class.

== Career ==
In all movements looking to the higher education and political enfranchisement of women, Bates was a long-time, persistent and able worker. She was probably officially connected with more societies looking to these ends than any other woman of her time in Michigan, if not in the U.S. She was a member of the Daughters of the American Revolution. She was a member of the board of directors of the Association for the Advancement of Woman, a member of the board of directors of the General Federation of Woman's Clubs, and chair of the committee on foreign correspondence of that organization, which consisted of about 500 federated clubs, numbering in all between 40,000 and 50,000 women. Bates was also a member of the committee on dress of The National Council of Women, an organization with about 1,000,000 members. Bates was president of The Detroit Woman's Club, and president of The Detroit Equal Suffrage Association, and connected with many other clubs and societies.

In the work of the congresses of the World's Columbian Exposition (1893), particularly the women's congresses, Bates was very prominent. She was a member of the Wayne County committee for Woman's Work, and its delegate to the congresses. She read two papers before the World's Congress of Representative Women, one before the Agricultural Congress, and one in the Woman's Building, besides also reading four other papers for writers who could not be present at the congresses. It is probable that her work in connection with these congresses, upon the platform and in committee work, was the most important and far-reaching work that Bates had done. The effect of these congresses, particularly in foreign countries, was compelling. The effect was notable in the United States, but here woman had already attained a much more advanced position than in many of the other countries of the globe. The titles of the papers which Bates read were “Obstacles to Improved Dress," "Ethics of Dress," "The New Municipal Suffrage Law for Woman in Michigan," and "Club Life for Women on a Farm,” the last being read before the Agricultural Congress. In addition to her own papers at the World's Fair congresses, Bates read papers for Belva Ann Lockwood, President Sarah Brown Ingersoll Cooper, of the International Kindergarten Association, and finally one for the Baroness Thorborg Rappe, of Sweden, who was sent to the fair by the Swedish Chamber of Deputies, the king being present at the session. This paper was on "The Progress of the Movement for Women in Sweden.”

In 1899, she was a member from the U.S. at the International Congress of Women in London.

In addition to her work before women's congresses and clubs and her addresses before women's colleges, Bates was quite a prominent writer for the reviews and magazines of the day. These included The Arena and numerous other publications of that class, particularly journals for women.

== Personal life ==
Bates came to Baltimore, Maryland in 1899 to address the International Convention of Secretaries of the King's Daughters. According to her own statement, the refined social atmosphere of the city and the hospitality of its people appealed to her so strongly that she made Baltimore her permanent home. She lived at the Mount Royal Apartments, Baltimore, for a number of years.

In religious faith, she was a Unitarian.

== Death and legacy ==
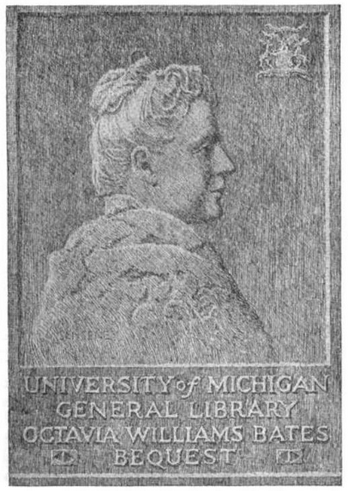
The Octavia Williams Bates bookplate honors her bequest to the University of Michigan General Library

Octavia Williams Bates died at her home in Baltimore, January 12, 1911.

After her death, George William Bates, Octavia's brother, contested his sister's will. The case, "George William Bates vs. E. John W. Revell, Executor of Octavia Williams Bates, Deceased" was heard before the Maryland Court of Appeals.

Bates left a generous bequest to the University of Michigan Law Library. In addition, she made the General Library of the university the residuary legatee of her estate. The income from this latter bequest became available in 1915, and on recommendation of the Librarian of the University, the Regents at once directed that a suitable bookplate be secured to mark the books purchased with the income of this fund. The bookplate, designed by George Senseney, represents a bronze memorial tablet in low relief. A copy was inserted in each volume bought with the income of the Bates bequest.
