= 182nd Infantry Regiment (United States) =

Oldest regiment of the United States Army

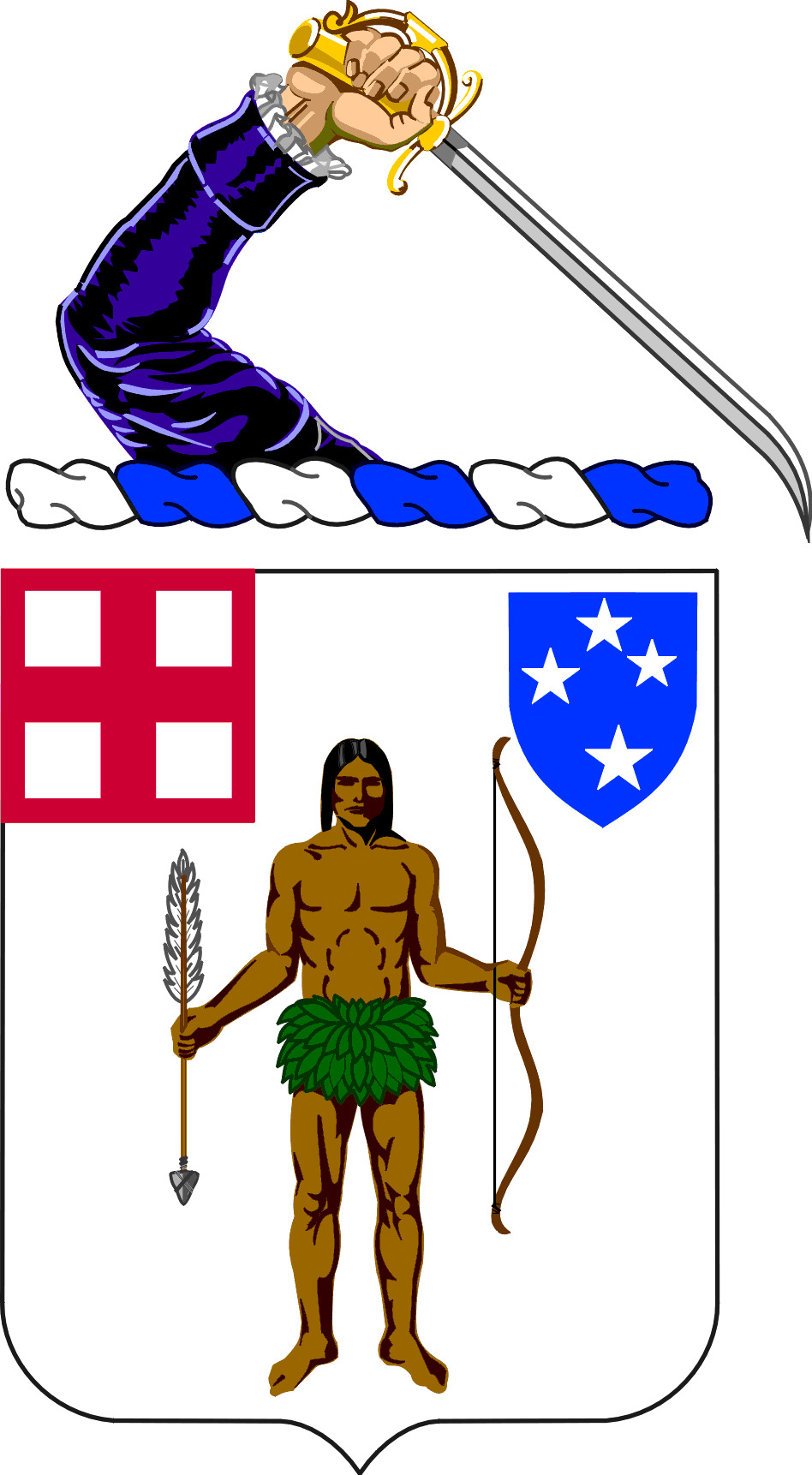
- The regimental coat of arms
- Active: 1636–present
- Country: Massachusetts Bay Colony (1636–1686, 1689-1692); Dominion of New England (1686-1689); Province of Massachusetts Bay (1692-1775); United Colonies (1775-1776); United States (1776–present)
- Allegiance: Massachusetts National Guard
- Branch: United States Army
- Type: Infantry
- Size: 1 Battalion
- Motto: Latin: Avitos Juvamus Honores ("We Uphold Our Ancient Honors")
- Engagements: King Philip's War; American Revolution; War of 1812; American Civil War; Mexican Expedition; World War I World War II; Afghanistan; Kosovo
- Decorations: Army Superior Unit Award

Commanders
- Current commander: Lieutenant Colonel Michael R. Lutkevich

Insignia
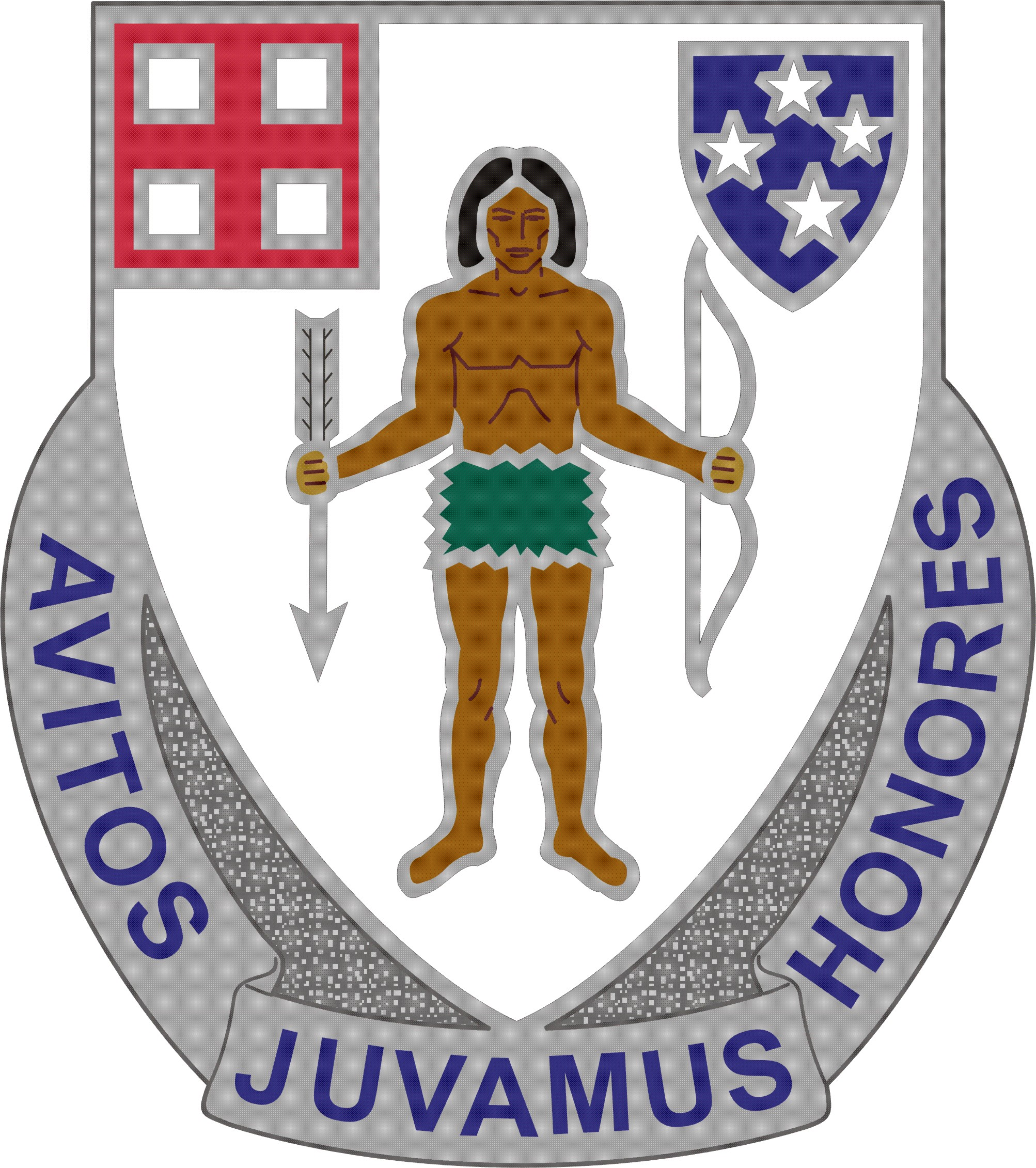
- Distinctive unit insignia

The 182nd Infantry Regiment is a regiment of the United States Army, forming part of the Massachusetts National Guard. It is the oldest regiment in the U.S. Army, sharing its lineage with the 181st Infantry and tracing its organizational roots back to 1636. It is one of several National Guard units with colonial roots and a campaign credit for the War of 1812.

The 182nd Infantry traces its history back nearly 400 years to its origins in the Massachusetts Bay colonial militia and later provincial forces. It later served in the Continental Army during the American Revolutionary War, with Union forces in the American Civil War, and as a federalized Massachusetts National Guard regiment with the U.S. Army during World War I and World War II.

For many years, the 182nd Infantry was a mechanized infantry unit. In 2006, it converted into the 182nd Cavalry Regiment, headquartered at Melrose Armory in Melrose, Massachusetts. It was converted back into an infantry regiment in 2010. The only currently active element of the regiment is its 1st Battalion.

== History ==
=== Formation and colonial operations ===
The 182nd Infantry Regiment traces its origins to the North Regiment which was constituted and organized on 7 October 1636 from existing training bands at Charlestown, New Town, Watertown, Concord, and Dedham. The regiment was redesignated on 10 March 1643 as the Regiment of Middlesex. As a colonial regiment operating in the American wilderness, the regiment was quick to incorporate changes in tactical doctrine based on conditions encountered in fighting Native Americans in King Philip's War and other conflicts, requiring each militiaman to own a modern flintlock musket prior to 1675. The unit was divided into two regiments on 13 October 1680, one designated as the Lower Regiment of Middlesex, to include the town of Charlestown, Cambridge, Watertown, Woburn, Malden and Reading.

It was redesignated prior to 1733 as the 1st Regiment of Militia of Middlesex. The 2nd Regiment of Militia of Middlesex, the other unit born of this division, has survived as the 181st Infantry Regiment.

=== Massachusetts Army and the American Revolution ===
At the onset of the American Revolutionary War, the Massachusetts Provincial Congress, meeting as a shadow government, ordered the activation of the 1st Middlesex County Regiment on 19 April 1775. It was reorganized and entered the Massachusetts Army as Gardner's Regiment on 23 April 1775 (elements of the regiment remained with the 1st Middlesex County Regiment for depot guards and for local defense). It was redesignated as Bond's Regiment upon the death of Colonel Gardner, on 3 July 1775. The unit was again redesignated on 1 January 1776 as the 25th Continental Regiment of the Continental Army, and on 1 January 1777 as the 7th Massachusetts Regiment, Continental Line. The regiment was mustered out of Continental service on 12 June 1783.

=== War of 1812 ===
The 182nd Infantry is one of only nineteen Army National Guard units with campaign credit for the War of 1812.

=== Civil War ===
The unit was ordered into active service for the defense of Washington on 19 April 1861 with attached companies from the 1st and 7th Regiments of Infantry, Massachusetts Volunteer Militia, and Major Cook's Light Artillery Company. It was mustered into federal service on 1 May 1861 at Washington, D.C., for three months service, and assigned to the 1st Brigade, 3rd Division. It participated in the First Battle of Bull Run before being mustered out on 1 August 1861 at Boston. The unit was again mustered into federal service between 16 September – 8 October 1862 at Wenham for nine months service; during which time it served in the Department of North Carolina and with the XVIII Corps. It was mustered out on 2 July 1863 at Wenham. It was mustered into federal service at Camp Meigs, Readville, Massachusetts, in July 1864 for 100 days service and served with the VIII Corps in the Middle Military Division (Baltimore and vicinity) before being mustered out on 16 November 1864 at Readville and resumed state militia status as the Massachusetts Volunteer Militia.

=== National Guard and overseas service ===
During the 1898 Spanish–American War the 5th Massachusetts was mustered into federal service but did not go overseas. On 15 November 1907, the 5th Massachusetts, as part of the land forces of the Massachusetts Volunteer Militia, was redesignated as a regiment of the Massachusetts National Guard.

The 5th Massachusetts was mustered into federal service on 25 June 1916 at Framingham for duty on the Mexican Border while stationed at El Paso, Texas. The regiment mustered out between 10 and 15 November 1916. It was called into federal service on 25 July 1917 and drafted into federal service on 5 August 1917 for service in World War I. The 5th Massachusetts was redesignated on 11 February 1918 as the 3rd Pioneer Infantry Regiment, and served in the U.S. First Army sector in France.

=== Interwar period ===
The 3rd Pioneer Infantry arrived at the port of New York on 23 July 1919 on the troopship USS Mexican and was demobilized from 25–31 July 1919 at Camp Devens, Massachusetts. It was reorganized as the 5th Infantry, Massachusetts National Guard, on 5 July 1920 with headquarters at Charlestown. Pursuant to the National Defense Act of 1920, the 5th Massachusetts was redesignated on 21 March 1923 as the 182nd Infantry (constituted in the National Guard in 1921 and allotted to Massachusetts). Along with the 181st Infantry, the 182nd Infantry was assigned alongside the 101st and 104th Infantry Regiments to the now all-Massachusetts 26th Division; the 26th's 102nd and 103rd Infantry Regiments that had served with it in World War I were lost to the newly-constituted 43rd Division, which contained units from Connecticut, Maine, Rhode Island, and Vermont. The regimental headquarters was organized on 11 April 1923 and federally recognized at Medford. The entire regiment, or elements thereof, was called up to perform the following state duties: flood relief at Lowell and Haverhill, Massachusetts, in the Merrimac River Valley, 4 April–19 May 1936; hurricane relief duty at Cape Cod, September 1938. Conducted annual summer training most years at Fort Devens, 1921–34; and at the Massachusetts Military Reservation (Camp Edwards) at Falmouth, 1935–39. Inducted into active federal service on 16 January 1941, and moved to Camp Edwards, where it arrived 25 January 1941.

=== World War II ===
The 182nd Infantry was relieved from the 26th Division and assigned to Task Force 6814 on 14 January 1942, which was later sent to Melbourne, Australia. On 6 March 1942 the men of the 182nd broke camp outside Melbourne and boarded troop trains for the docks in Melbourne. With the rest of the Task Force, the 182nd traveled to a classified destination which turned out to be New Caledonia, where they arrived on 12 March 1942. On 27 May 1942, Task Force 6814 was redesignated the Americal Division, one of only two American infantry divisions to be assigned a name instead of a number; “Americal” is a combination of the words “American” and “Caledonia.”

As part of a piecemeal transfer of the Americal Division, the 182nd was deployed to combat in the Battle of Guadalcanal on 12 November 1942, where the regiment's 3rd Battalion participated in an operation to capture the Japanese defensive works atop the Sea Horse, a prominent terrain feature on the island. Maintaining contact with elements of other U.S. Army regiments in the assault, the 3rd Battalion began its ascent, and by 30 December was in action against Japanese forces atop the Sea Horse. The fighting was so intense that some of the Americans could not be removed after being killed, and were buried where they fell. In 2008, the remains of Lt. Raymond S. Woods of the 182nd Infantry Regiment, who was killed in action on 30 December 1942 in fighting atop the Sea Horse Ridge, were located and transferred to JPAC. The 182nd later fought in the Bougainville campaign, the Northern Solomons, and later in the Battle of Leyte.

On 26 March 1945, during Operation Victor II, the 182nd landed at Talisay Beach, four miles (6.5 km) west of Cebu City, taking Cebu City the next day. Moving into the jungled hills of the interior, the 182nd fought the Battle of Go Chan Hill 28–29 March 1945 and then battled to clear the other hills in the area. They were heavily counterattacked by fanatical Japanese defenders on Bolo Ridge. After eliminating Japanese resistance on Cebu, the 182nd rested and reequipped, later boarding ship from Cebu for occupation duty in Japan.

The division returned to the United States on 21 November 1945, and was inactivated on 12 December 1945 at Fort Lewis, Washington State. It was reactivated on 1 December 1954 as the 23rd Infantry Division, retaining the name "Americal" as part of its official designation.

=== Later service ===
The 2nd Battalion was inactivated on 29 November 1945 at Fort Lewis, Washington. The regiment (less the 2nd Battalion which inactivated on 2 December 1945 at Fort Lawton staging area, Washington) was relieved from the Americal Division and assigned to the 182nd Regimental Combat Team on 8 July 1946. It reorganized and was federally recognized on 5 December 1946 with headquarters at Charlestown. Its headquarters relocated to Melrose on 30 September 1955.

The unit was relieved from the 182nd Regimental Combat Team on 1 May 1959 and reorganized as the 182nd Infantry (Mechanized) under the Combat Arms Regimental System. On 1 September 1992, the 182nd Infantry was consolidated with the 101st Infantry Regiment, and the consolidated unit was designated as the 182nd Infantry, with headquarters at Melrose, to consist of the 1st Battalion, an element of the 26th Infantry Division.

In 2004, Charlie Company was attached to Task Force 1-114th and deployed to Egypt with the Multinational Forces Of Observers. Upon their return, 10 volunteers from Charlie (official designated Charlie Company Forward) were attached to 3-103rd AR under 2/28 BCT. They served in Ramadi, Iraq, until 2006. In 2006, the regiment was reorganized and redesignated the 182nd Cavalry Regiment, ending 370 years of history as an infantry regiment. Thus as a reconnaissance, surveillance, and target acquisition force, the 1st Squadron, 182nd Cavalry Regiment served as a fast-moving armored reconnaissance unit.

From August 2006 to November 2007 the 1st Squadron 182nd Cavalry served as Task Force Patriot in Kosovo. They were responsible for a large portion of southern Kosovo in the turbulent year that preceded final status and independence for Kosovo from Serbia.

As of 2007, the squadron had detached elements serving in Iraq and Afghanistan. In 2008, the squadron completed a 15-month tour of active duty in Kosovo supporting the NATO efforts there as part of Task Force Patriot. One notable contribution of the Task Force was the collection of school supplies and textbooks for children in remote areas of the country through its civil affairs program.

=== Back to infantry ===
An online article by the Massachusetts Army National Guard, dated 3 August 2009, stated that the unit would soon revert to an infantry configuration.

Effective 13 December 2010, the 1–182nd Cavalry was yet again redesignated to the 1–182nd Infantry Regiment.

In March 2011, the 1st Battalion 182nd Infantry mobilized for service in Afghanistan in support of Operation Enduring Freedom. In June 2011, the 182nd Infantry relieved the 181st Infantry in Afghanistan.

Delta company 2nd platoon was inserted into Assadabad Afghanistan at FOB WRIGHT in June 2011 and occupied remotely positioned observation post Nevada upon a ridge line 8 kilometers from the Pakistan border over seeing the Sar Kani village and the Kunar valley. They received many distinguished decorations to include the Purple Heart, the ARCOM; they conducted more than 75 combat missions in which they were either a gunner, driver or dismounted personnel, the NATO award was awarded for service in relation to ISAF operations, the overseas service ribbon (OSR), the global war on terrorism service medal (GWOTSM), Afghanistan campaign medal with 1st campaign star, certain members of the platoon were awarded the Combat Infantry Badge for direct participation in ground combat action for having been personally present and under hostile enemy fire in Afghanistan, Pech Valley, Kunar province while leaving Cop Honaker-Miracle the patrol was ambushed with IED explosion dividing the element in half they relied on their training and prevailed with no casualties, on 17 Aug 2011 while serving with PRT Kunar in direct support of operation enduring freedom, the NAVY achievement medal was awarded to the national guard soldiers that were attached with the Navy element At the end of March 2012, having been relieved by the 143rd Infantry, the 182nd Infantry was released from active duty, having completed its tour in Afghanistan.

In July 2015, the 1-182 IN conducted Annual Training with the New York Army National Guard's 27th Infantry Brigade Combat Team (IBCT) as part of the 'aligned for training' initiative. The 1-182 IN was officially assigned to the 27th IBCT on October 1, 2016.

Since its alignment with the 27th IBCT, the 1-182 IN supported numerous domestic operations including COVID 1 and 2, and OPERATION CAPITOL RESPONSE. During COVID 1 and 2, almost 100 Soldiers conducted COVID testing and administered vaccines throughout Massachusetts and Rhode Island.

The 1-182 IN mobilized in January 2021, taking 1,000 National Guard Soldiers and Air Guard Defenders from Massachusetts and Rhode Island to the National Capitol Region, where Task Force Americal secured the House of Representatives through the 59th Presidential Administration.

In May 2022, the 1-182 IN mobilized and deployed to the Arabian Peninsula supporting Operation Spartan Shield. Together, A, B, C, D and HHC secured critical facilities in Jordan, Kuwait, Saudi Arabia, Qatar, and the United Arab Emirates. D Co, stationed in Jordan, also conducted ground convoys into Syria supporting Operation Inherent Resolve. As part of the deployment, two soldiers were commemorated: Specialist Ryan Leger on his way home from drill pre-deployment risked his life to rescue a mother from a burning car and Sergeant Mickey Reeve created a counter-UAS training program from his time working on base of prince sultan airforce base

== See also ==
- Massachusetts Line

== Notes ==
=== Bibliography ===
- United States Department of the Army (1953). The Army Lineage Book. Vol. II: Infantry. Washington: GPO.
