= List of Army National Guard units with campaign credit for the War of 1812 =

Twenty-three current units of the Army National Guard perpetuate the lineages of militia units mustered into federal service during the War of 1812. Militia units from nine states that were part of the Union by the end of the War of 1812 (Delaware, Georgia, Maryland, Massachusetts, New Jersey, New York, Pennsylvania, South Carolina and Virginia), plus the District of Columbia, are the predecessors of eighteen units that currently exist in the Army National Guard. Two of the four units derived from Virginia militias are in the West Virginia National Guard; at the time of the War of 1812, West Virginia was still part of Virginia. Only two current units, the 155th Infantry, a component of the Mississippi National Guard derived from militia units organized in the Mississippi Territory and the 130th Infantry, a component of the Illinois National Guard derived from militia units formed in the Illinois Territory, are from states or territories west of the Appalachians. Unfortunately, no militia units from the states of Kentucky, Louisiana, Ohio or Tennessee, or from the Indiana, Michigan, Missouri or Louisiana Territories, where militia units played a major role in the fighting, have survived as units in the modern Army National Guard. There are also twenty-three active Regular Army battalions with campaign credit for the War of 1812.

== 198th Signal Battalion (ARNG DE) ==
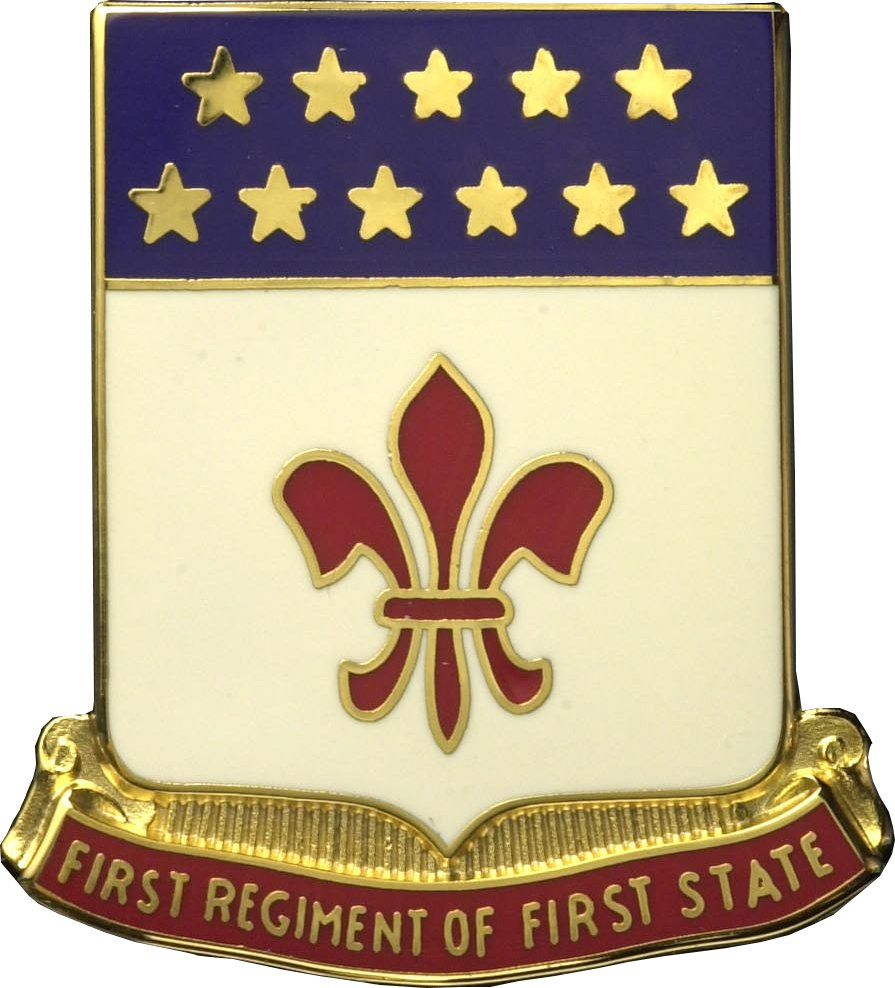
Distinctive Unit Insignia: 198 Sig Bn

Campaigns: Delaware 1812, Delaware 1813, Delaware 1814

The 198th Signal Battalion is derived from the Delaware Regiment, constituted on December 9, 1775, and organized in early 1776 as Colonel John Haslet's Regiment. During the Revolutionary War, the regiment participated in fifteen campaigns.

Three units created from the Delaware Regiment during the last decade of the eighteenth century saw service during the War of 1812: Light Infantry, 1st Infantry, 1st Regiment, 1st Brigade (mustered into federal service May 23, 1813, and mustered out on July 31, 1813, and mustered in again on August 28, 1814, and out between January 3 and March 13, 1815); the Artillery Company, 2nd Brigade (served from May 23, 1814, to September 2, 1814); and the 1st Company, Light Infantry, 8th Regiment, 3rd Brigade (in federal service from March 2, 1813, to May 4, 1813, from May 6, 1813, to July 31, 1813, and from August 6, 1814, to January 11, 1815).

The primary activity of the Delaware militia during the War of 1812 was defending coastal communities from raids by British landing parties during the blockade of the Delaware Bay and Delaware River beginning in early March 1813 and continuing into 1814. The militia units were continually shifted from one location to another in response to movements of the British ships. On March 6, 1813, the town of Lewes was threatened with destruction by the commander of the British flotilla if it failed to provide the British with supplies. The town refused the demand and was subjected to a twenty-two-hour bombardment beginning on April 6. A landing party was repulsed on April 7. The 1st Company, 8th Regiment, 3rd Brigade was present in Lewes from March 19, 1813, through March 24 and from May 3 through May 11, 1813, but not at the time of the British bombardment.; the Artillery Company, 2nd Brigade was deployed to Lewes in early June.

== HHD/372nd Military Police Battalion (ARNG DC) ==
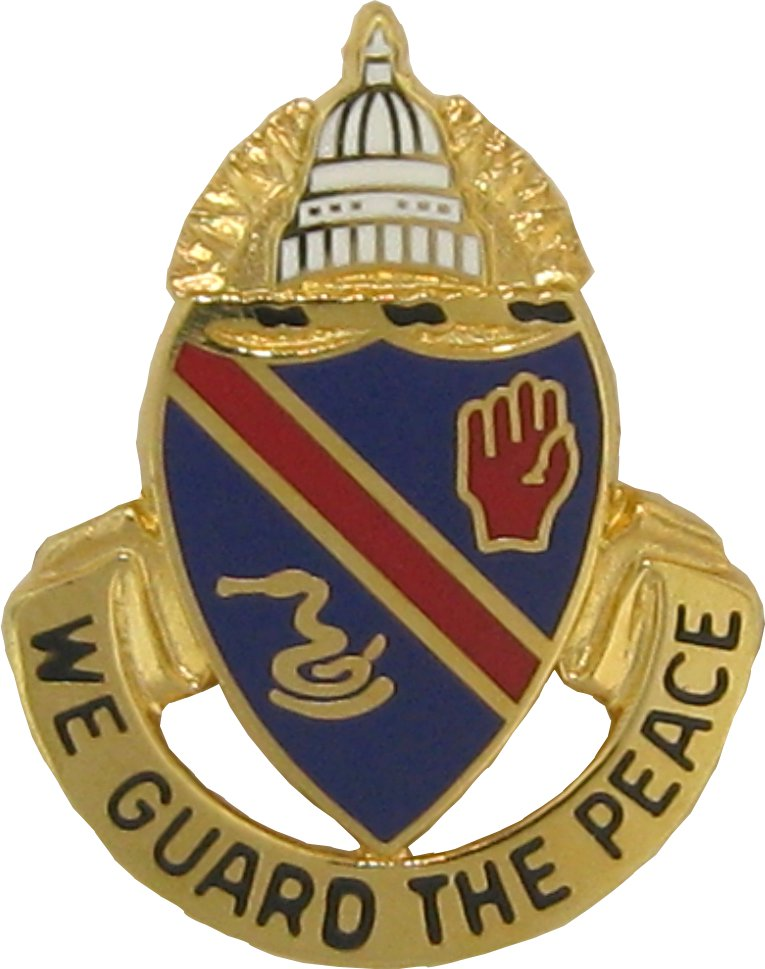
Distinctive Unit Insignia: 372 MP Bn

Campaigns: Fort Washington 1813, Bladensburg

The HHD/372nd Military Police Battalion traces its formation to the First Legion, Columbian Brigade constituted in the District of Columbia on May 3, 1802, and organized during the summer of 1802 from existing volunteer militia companies north of the Potomac River.

The unit was expanded, reorganized and redesignated on April 17, 1813, as the 1st Brigade, Columbian Division, to comprise two regiments. It was mustered into federal service on July 15, 1813, and mustered out on July 31, 1813, then mustered in again on July 19, 1814, and out on October 8, 1814.

During the Battle of Bladensburg, which culminated on August 24, 1814, the Columbian Division occupied the left portion of the second line of defense against the attacking British. When the first line of defense, which had been badly positioned by its commander, Brigadier General Tobias Stansbury, crumbled, the position of the Columbian Division became vulnerable. The division was able to resist the British advance for a while, but was forced to withdraw when its left flank came under attack. In the absence of clear orders from the American commander of the Tenth Military District, Brigadier General William Winder, concerning what to do in the event that a retreat was necessary, the defenders fled the field.

== 118th Field Artillery (ARNG GA) ==
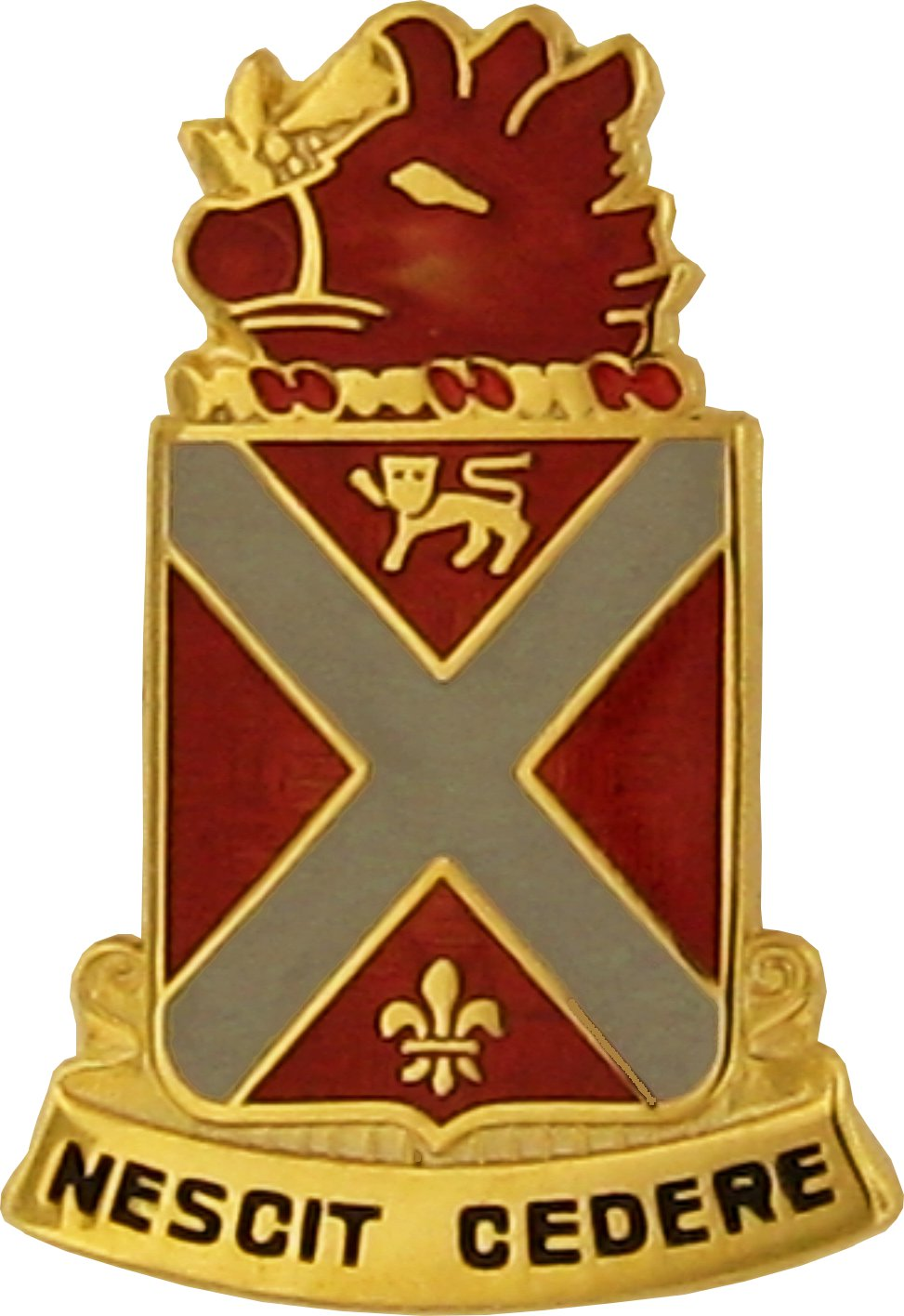
Distinctive Unit Insignia: 118 FA

Campaigns: Streamer without inscription

The 118th Field Artillery traces its lineage back to four independent volunteer companies, three of foot and one of horse, organized in the Georgia Militia in the District to Savannah on April 18, 1751. The Georgia militia units in Savannah and surrounding Chatham County were reorganized in 1782 as the 1st Battalion, 1st Regiment, 1st Brigade, 1st Division.

The main role of the Savannah militia during the War of 1812 was as a local defense force that remained under local control. However, three companies from the 1st Battalion were mustered into federal service during the early stages of the war: the Savannah Volunteer Guards (organized in 1802) and the Republican Blues (organized in 1808), mustered into federal service in east Florida in June 1812 as elements of Colonel Daniel Newman's provisional battalion of Georgia Volunteers and mustered out in October 1812; and the Heavy Artillery Company (organized in 1812), mustered in on October 19, 1812, at Fort James Jackson, Georgia, a fort one mile from Savannah, and mustered out on November 23, 1812.

The City Battalion of Savannah was mustered into service on January 22, 1815, as the 1st Regiment, Georgia Volunteers, and mustered out on February 23, 1815. This service came after the signing on December 24, 1814, of the Treaty of Ghent, the peace treaty that ended the war. However, neither the Americans nor the commander of the British fleet operating off the Georgia coast were aware of this event, and so elements of the Georgia militia were federalized to counter the British Cumberland Island Campaign (January–March 1815), during which the British occupied Cumberland Island at the mouth of the St. Mary's River between Georgia and Florida.

== 130th Infantry (ARNG IL) ==
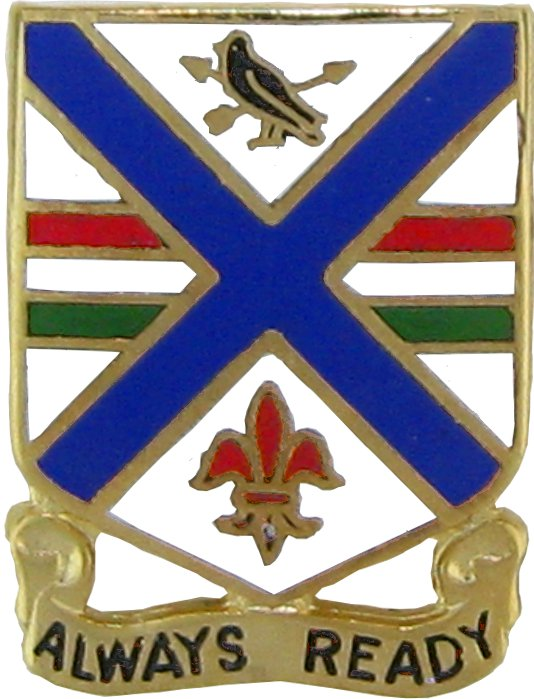
Distinctive Unit Insignia: 130 Inf

Campaigns: Streamer without inscription

The 130th Infantry traces its history back to March 1, 1809, when the Volunteer Militias of the Illinois Territory were constituted and organized as independent companies.

The companies destined to become the 130th Infantry were mustered into federal service on February 18, 1813, as the Regiment of Illinois Territory Militia, and mustered out on June 16, 1813, following which elements reverted to independent status in the Illinois Territory Militia.

The federalization of the Illinois Militia in early 1813 was a response to the massacre of two families on the Cache River near present-day Mound City by Creeks returning from the Battle of Frenchtown on the Raison River in Michigan. The primary function of the Illinois Militia during the War of 1812 was providing security for isolated settlements in areas of the territory inhabited by hostile Native tribes, especially the Potawatomi and the Kickapoo.

The Illinois Militia was also mustered into federal service in 1831 as Duncan's Brigade, which included the 1st and 2nd Regiments of Illinois Mounted Volunteers, Major Bailey's Odd Battalion and Major Buckmaster's Battalion of Spies, all from central and southern Illinois, and again in 1832 for service in the Black Hawk War.

After numerous reorganizations during the nineteenth century, these elements became the 4th Infantry Regiment in 1890, and subsequently the 130th Infantry in 1917.

The black hawk and two red arrows in the Distinctive Unit Insignia commemorate service in the Black Hawk War. The horizontal belt of red, white and green, the saltire from the Confederate flag and the fleur-de-lis represent service in the Mexican War, the Civil War and for service in France during World War I, respectively.

== 175th Infantry (ARNG MD) ==
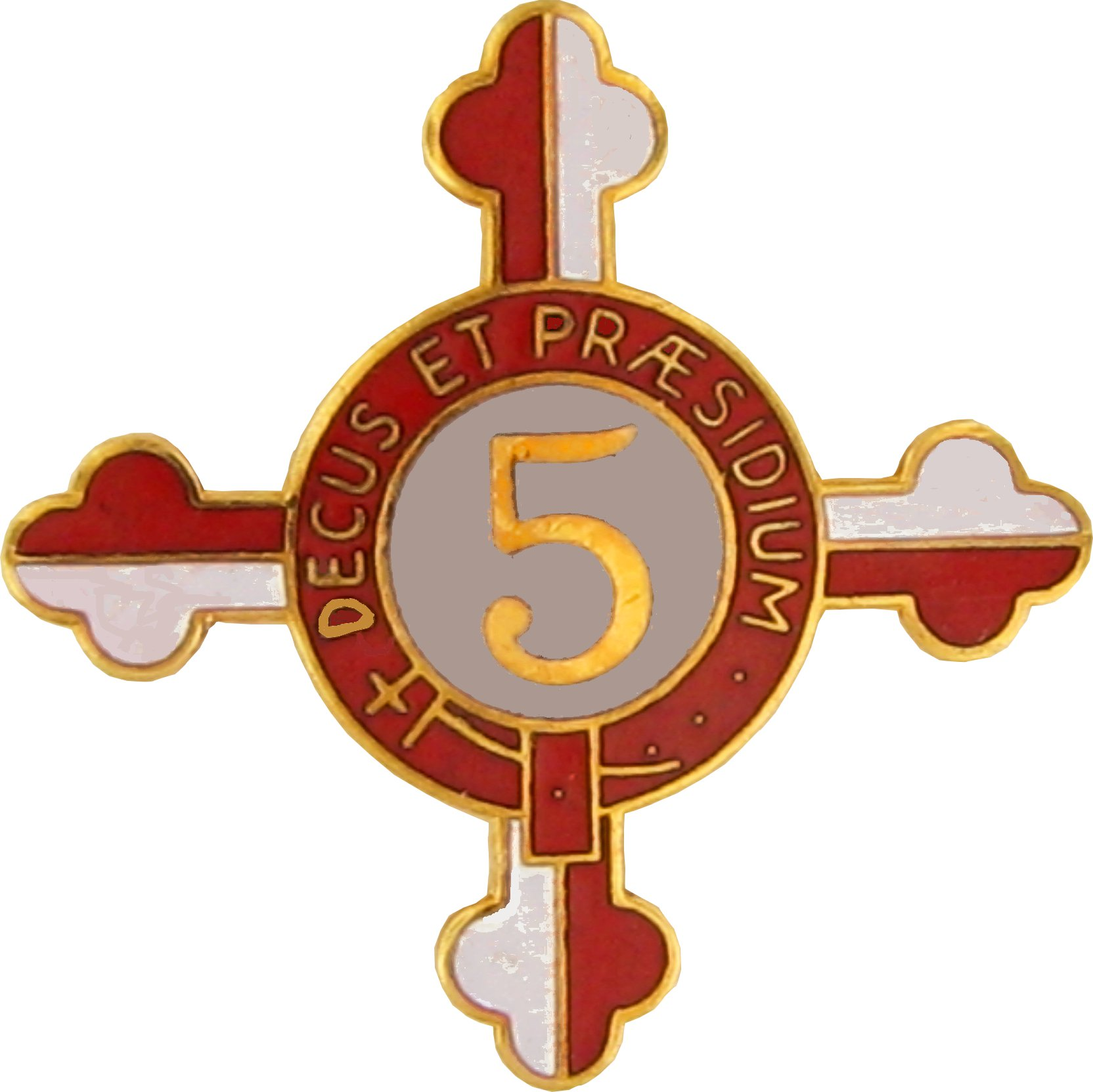
Distinctive Unit Insignia: 175 Inf

Campaigns: Bladensburg, Maryland 1814

The 175th Infantry traces its lineage all the way back to the Baltimore Independent Cadets, a company of sixty "gentlemen of honour, family, and fortune" organized in 1774. In 1776 the Cadets were absorbed into William Smallwood's Maryland Battalion, which was later expanded and reorganized into the 1st through the 7th Maryland Regiments. These seven regiments earned credit for fourteen campaigns during the Revolutionary War. In 1794 the volunteer militia companies of Baltimore were reorganized as elements of the 5th Regiment of Militia.

The 5th Regiment was in federal service from August 19, 1814, through November 18, 1814. During the Battle of Bladensburg, which culminated on August 24, 1814, the "Dandy Fifth," along with other Maryland militia units, provided the first line of defense against the attacking British. As the British advanced, the 5th Maryland counterattacked, but when the 1st and 2nd Regiments on their left broke and fled, the 5th joined the rest of Maryland militia in a disorderly retreat from the field.

The 5th gave a much better account of itself on September 12, 1814, at the Battle of North Point, which was part of the Battle of Baltimore. The 5th Regiment held its position against the attacking British, and then conducted a successful fighting retreat that significantly slowed the British advance on Baltimore.

== 101st Engineer Battalion (ARNG MA) ==
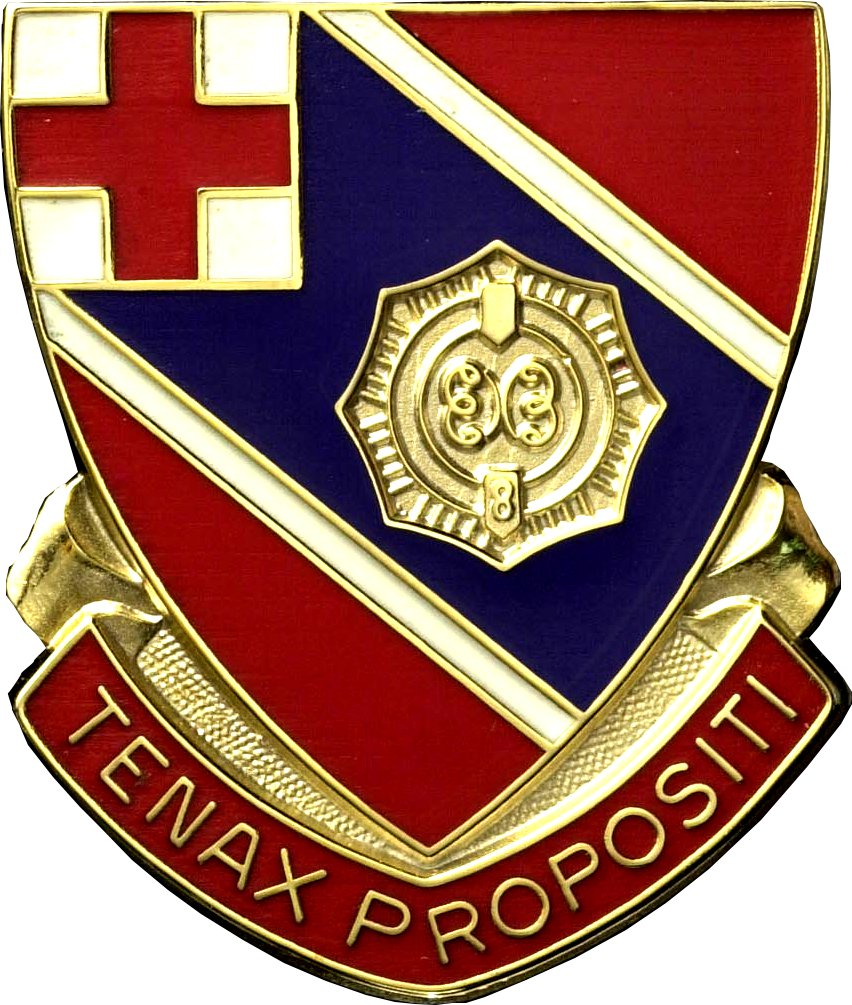
Distinctive Unit Insignia:101 Eng Bn

Campaigns: Massachusetts 1814

The 101st Engineer Battalion is one of the four oldest units in the U.S. Army, the other three being the 101st Field Artillery, the 181st Infantry and the 182nd Infantry, all from Massachusetts and all with credit for participation in the War of 1812 (see below). The 101st Engineer Battalion traces its origins to the East Regiment, organized in the Massachusetts Militia from existing train bands on December 13, 1636. The East Regiment became the Essex Regiment in 1643, and was then expanded in 1680 to form the 1st (South) and 2nd (North) Essex Regiment, and expanded again in 1689 to form the 1st (Lower), 2nd (Upper) and 3rd (Middle) Essex Regiments, and yet again in 1774 to form the 1st-6th Essex Regiments.

During the American Revolution the six Essex Regiments were organized as the Essex County Brigade, to consist of eight regiments. The Essex County Brigade remained in state service during the Revolutionary War, but in addition formed five regiments that served in the Continental Army.

In 1785 the Essex County Brigade was reorganized as the 2nd Division, consisting of the 1st and 2nd Brigades. During the War of 1812, flank companies of the 2nd Division were mustered into federal service as elements of the Elite Brigade during September–October, 1814. This was a time when the British navy was increasingly threatening coastal communities along the northern Atlantic seaboard. The Massachusetts 1814 campaign credit awarded to the 101st Engineer Battalion was earned when Essex County units thwarted British attempts to put forces ashore in Essex County.

The badge in the blue stripe of the Distinctive Unit Insignia was the insignia of the old Essex Brigade.

== 101st Field Artillery (ARNG MA) ==
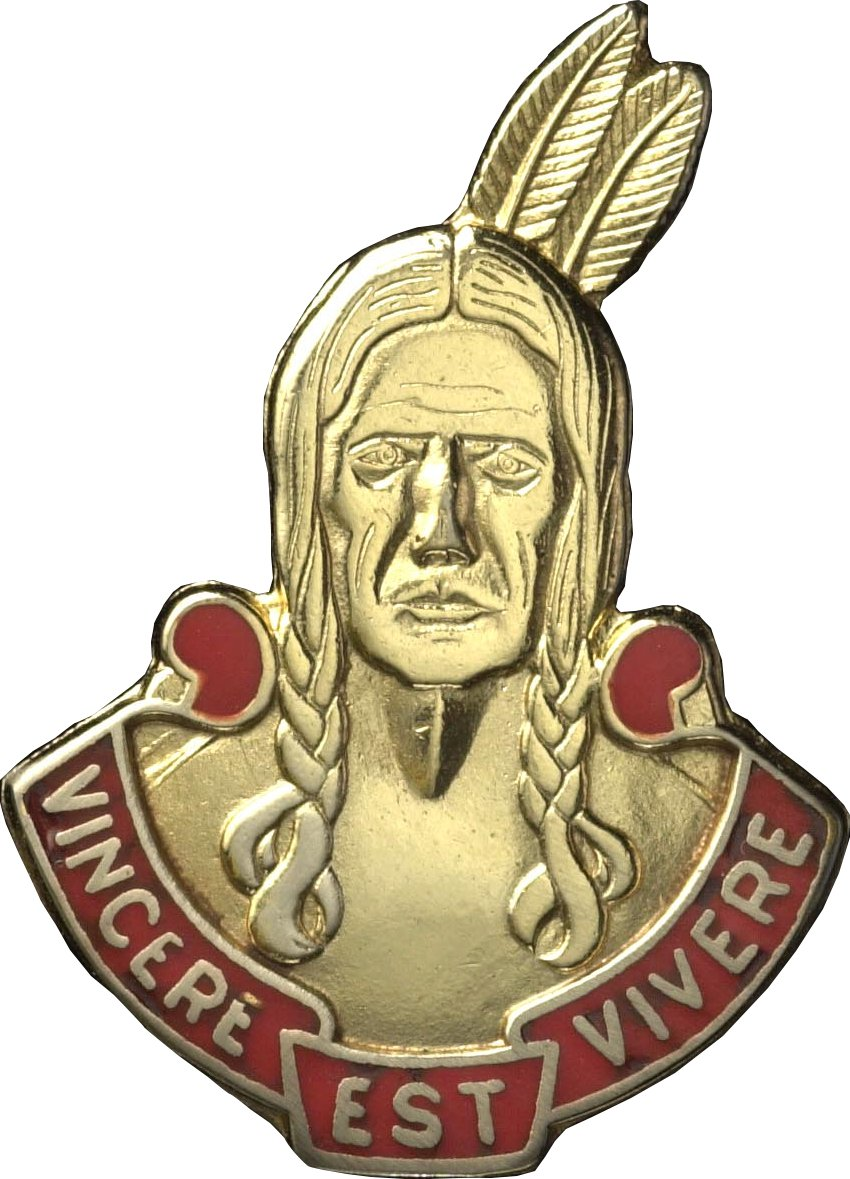
Distinctive Unit Insignia: 101 FA

Campaigns: Streamer without inscription

The 101st Field Artillery traces its lineage back to the South Regiment, organized on December 13, 1636, from new and existing train bands in Boston, Dorchester, Roxbury, Weymouth and Hingham. It was redesignated as the Suffolk Regiment in 1643. The Suffolk Regiment was expanded in 1689 to form the Boston Regiment and the Suffolk Regiment. The 101st Field Artillery is derived from the Boston Regiment. While remaining in state service during the Revolutionary War, the Boston Regiment spawned Henry Jackson's Additional Continental Regiment, later designated as the 16th Massachusetts Regiment, which participated in five campaigns during the American Revolution.

By 1810 the Boston Regiment had become the 3rd Brigade, 1st Division, consisting of the Battalion of Artillery (Volunteer Militia) and the 1st, 2nd and 3rd Regiments (Standing Militia). The Flank (Volunteer Militia) Companies of the 3rd Brigade, 1st Division were mustered into federal service during September and October, 1814, as elements of the Elite Brigade.

The Massachusetts militia was one of the largest, best equipped and best trained of any of the state militias, but support for the war in New England was lukewarm at best. As a consequence, no Massachusetts units were federalized until 1814, although as state units they were active in guarding the state's coastline. Only after Great Britain burned Washington and generally increased its naval pressure on the East Coast did Massachusetts allow its militias to be mustered into federal service.

== 181st Infantry (ARNG MA) ==
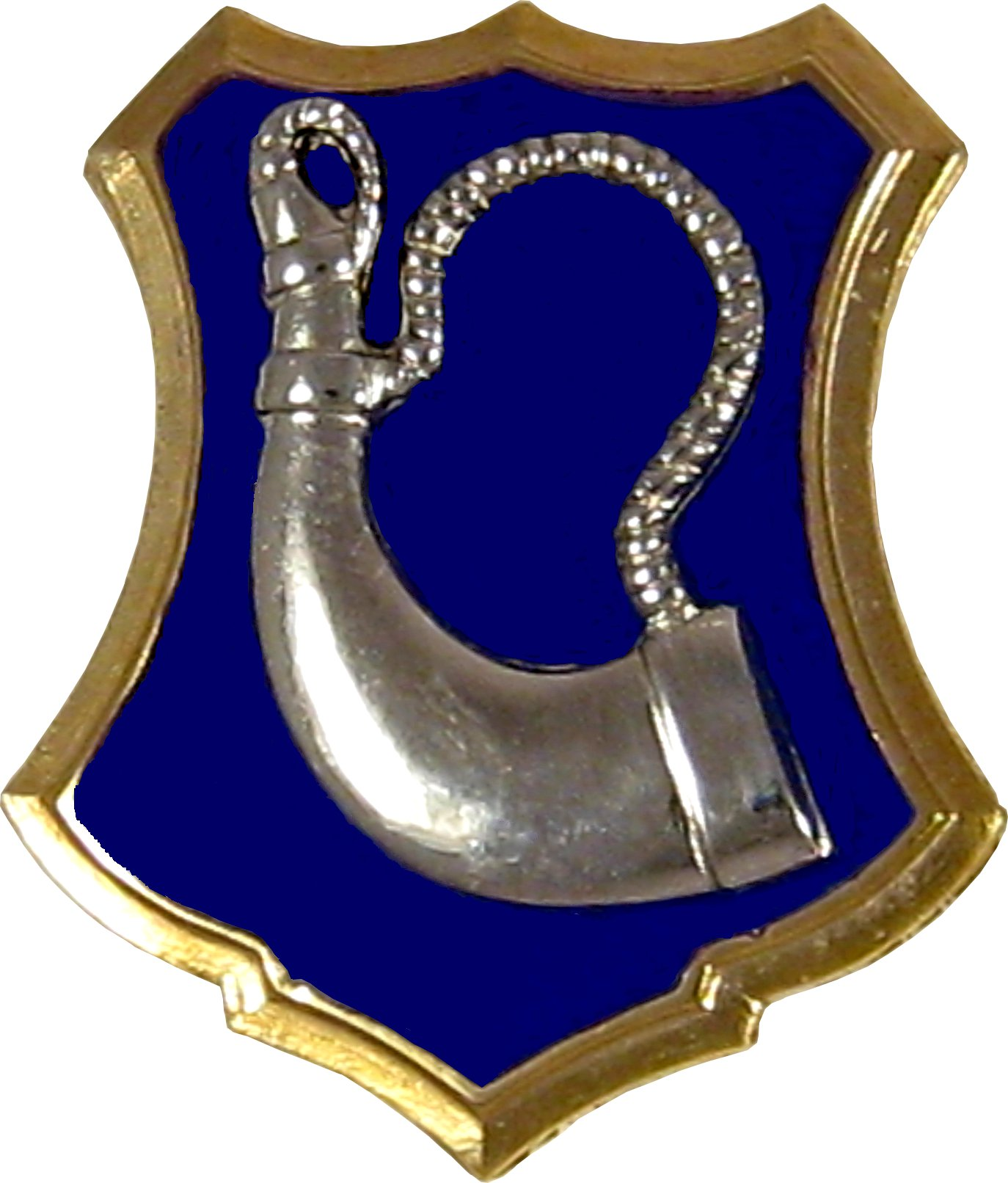
Distinctive Unit Insignia: 181 Inf

Campaigns: Streamer without inscription

The 181st and 182nd Infantry Regiments are two of the oldest units in the U.S. Army, both tracing their origins all the way back to the North Regiment, organized in 1636 from militia units at Cambridge, Charlestown, Watertown, Dedham and Concord, and redesignated as the Middlesex Regiment in 1643. In 1680 additional companies from other towns were added, and the Middlesex Regiment was split into the 2nd (Upper) Middlesex Regiment, which ultimately became the 181st Infantry, and the 1st (Lower) Middlesex Regiment, which ultimately became the 182nd Infantry.

By the time of the War of 1812, the 2nd Middlesex Regiment had become the 2nd Brigade, 3rd Division in the Massachusetts militia. Flank companies of the 2nd Brigade, 3rd Division served as elements of the Elite Brigade, which was mustered into federal service during September and October, 1814, for service in Boston.

The 181st Infantry also perpetuates the lineage of the 104th Infantry, with which it was consolidated in 2006. The 104th Infantry traces its roots to the Hampshire Regiment, constituted in 1662, which later became the Hampshire and Berkshire County Brigades. By the time of the War of 1812 these two brigades had become the 4th and 9th Divisions, respectively. From these two divisions, five regiments were organized for federal service at Boston from September through November 1814.

== 182nd Infantry (ARNG MA) ==
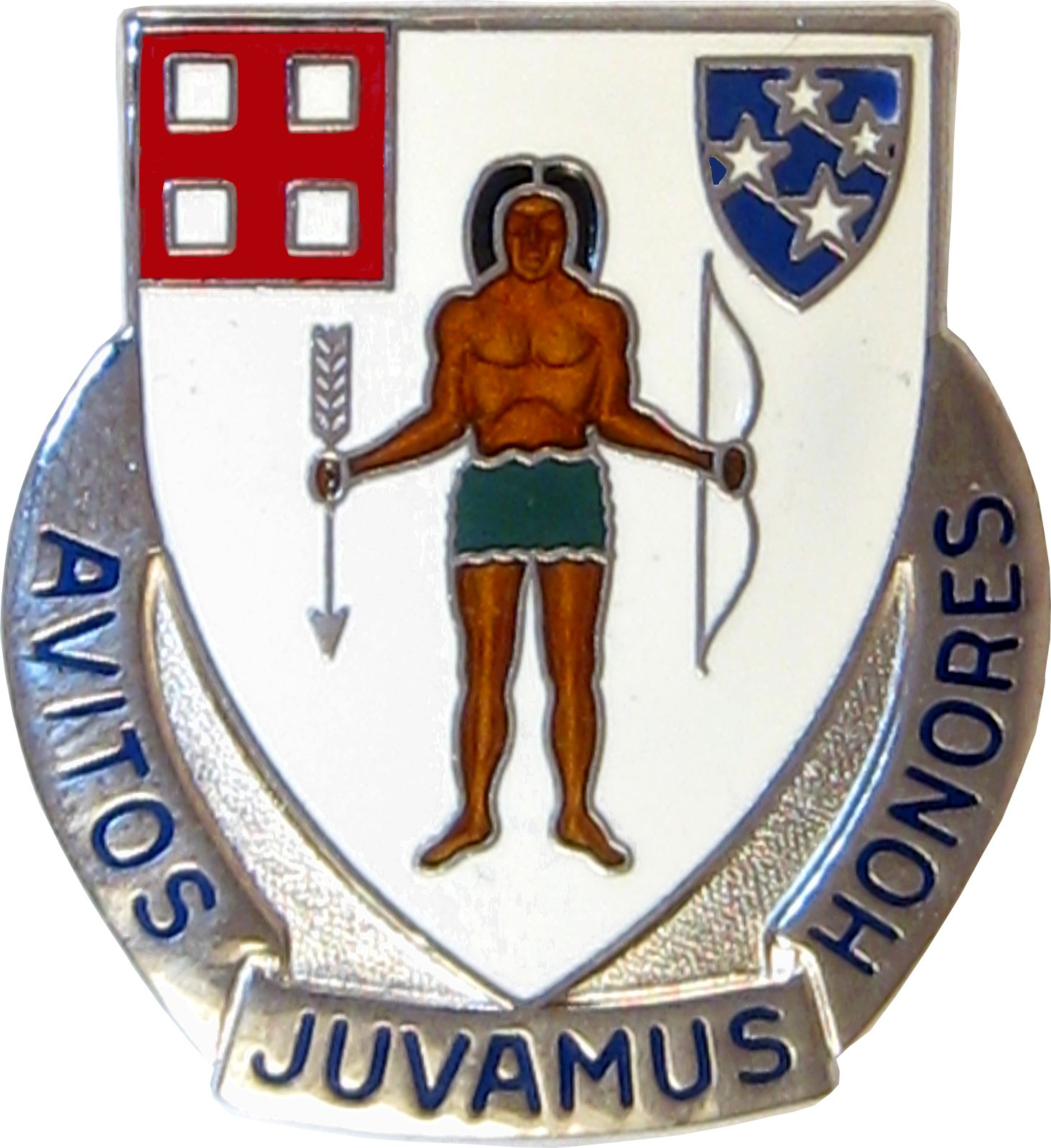
Distinctive Unit Insignia: 182 Inf

Campaigns: Streamer without inscription

The Middlesex Regiment, the origin of which is described above in the section on the 181st Infantry, was split into the 1st (Lower) and 2nd (Upper) Middlesex Regiments in 1680. The 1st Middlesex Regiment ultimately became the 182nd Infantry, while the 2nd Middlesex Regiment became the 181st Infantry. By the time of the War of 1812, the 1st Middlesex Regiment had become the 1st Brigade, 3rd Division in the Massachusetts militia. Flank companies of the 1st Brigade, 3rd Division were mustered into federal service as elements of the Elite Brigade, which served at Boston during September and October 1814.

The 182nd Infantry also perpetuates the lineage of the 101st Infantry, with which it was consolidated in 1992. The 101st Infantry traces its roots to the Columbia Artillery in the Legionary Brigade of Boston, organized in 1798. This unit was also assigned to the Elite Brigade during September and October 1814.

The mobilization of militia units in Boston during the fall of 1814 was a response to increased activity of the British navy along the eastern seaboard beginning in the late summer. The British raid on Washington and the attack on Fort McHenry and the attempted occupation of Baltimore had sparked fears of attacks of other Atlantic ports. However, no attack materialized, and in October the British ended their campaign in the Chesapeake Bay.

== 772nd Military Police Company (ARNG MA) ==
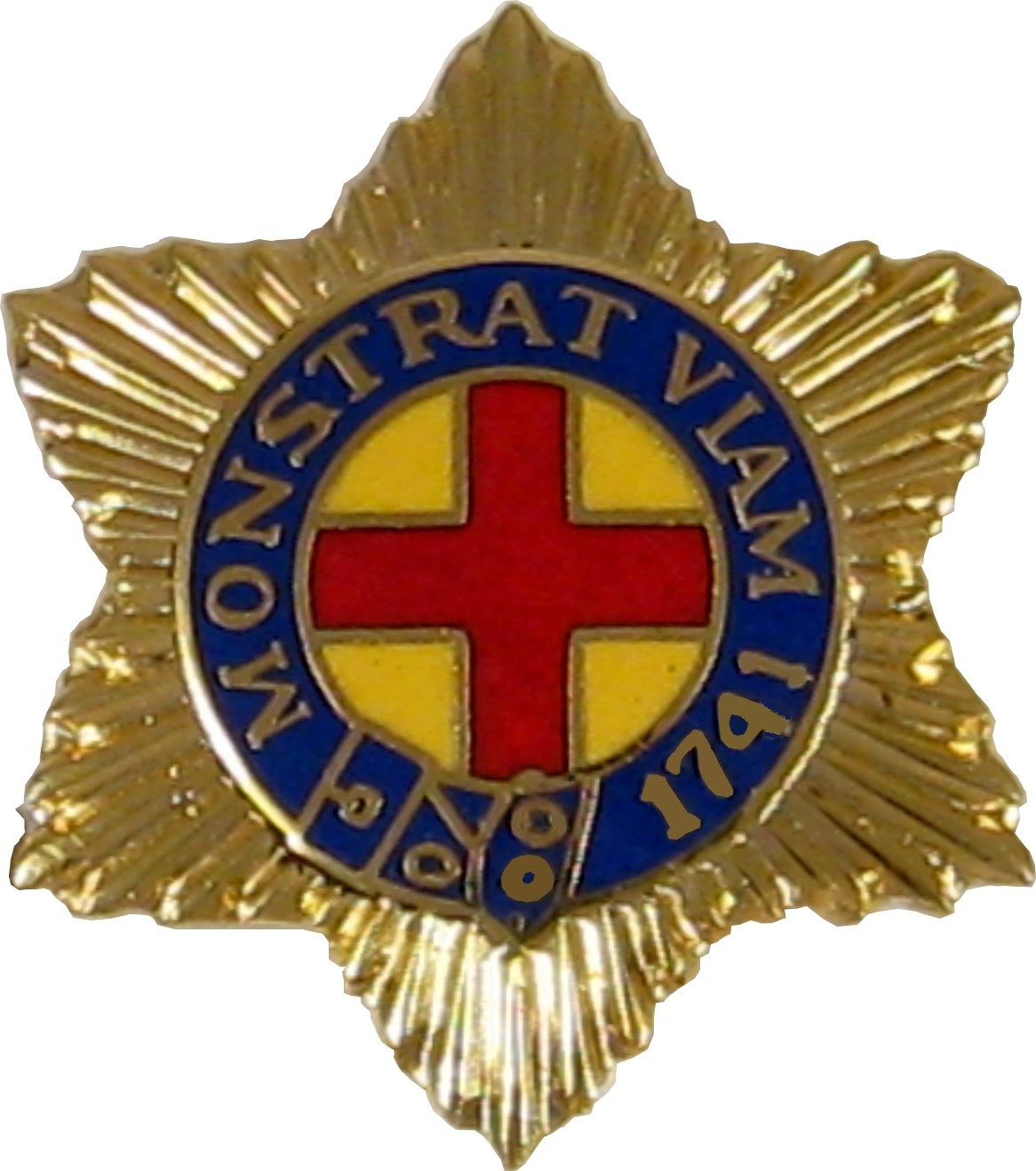
Distinctive Unit Insignia: 211 MP BN

Campaigns: Streamer without inscription

The 772nd Military Police Company traces its origins to the Cohannet Train Band, Plymouth Colony Militia. Organized on March 3, 1638, and redesignated as the Taunton, Massachusetts Train Band in 1639, it is the oldest company-level unit in the United States Army. The unit's first major military action was during King Philip's War (1675–1676), a conflict between the colonists and a confederation of Indian tribes organized by a Wampanoag chief named Metacom, but referred to as King Philip by the colonists, to resist expansion of white settlements in southern New England. By 1703 the Taunton Train Band had assumed the honorific title "First Military Company," and in 1785 it became the 1st Foot Company, 3rd Regiment, 2nd Brigade, 5th Division.

Under the command of Captain Joseph Reed, Jr., the 1st Company was mustered into service on September 6, 1814, at a time when an invasion by the British was feared, and served for thirty days. The company was deployed to New Bedford.

Since companies are not issued Distinctive Unit Insignia, the 772nd Military Police Company wears the Distinctive Unit Insignia of the 211th Military Police Battalion, in which it serves.

== 972nd Military Police Company (ARNG MA) ==
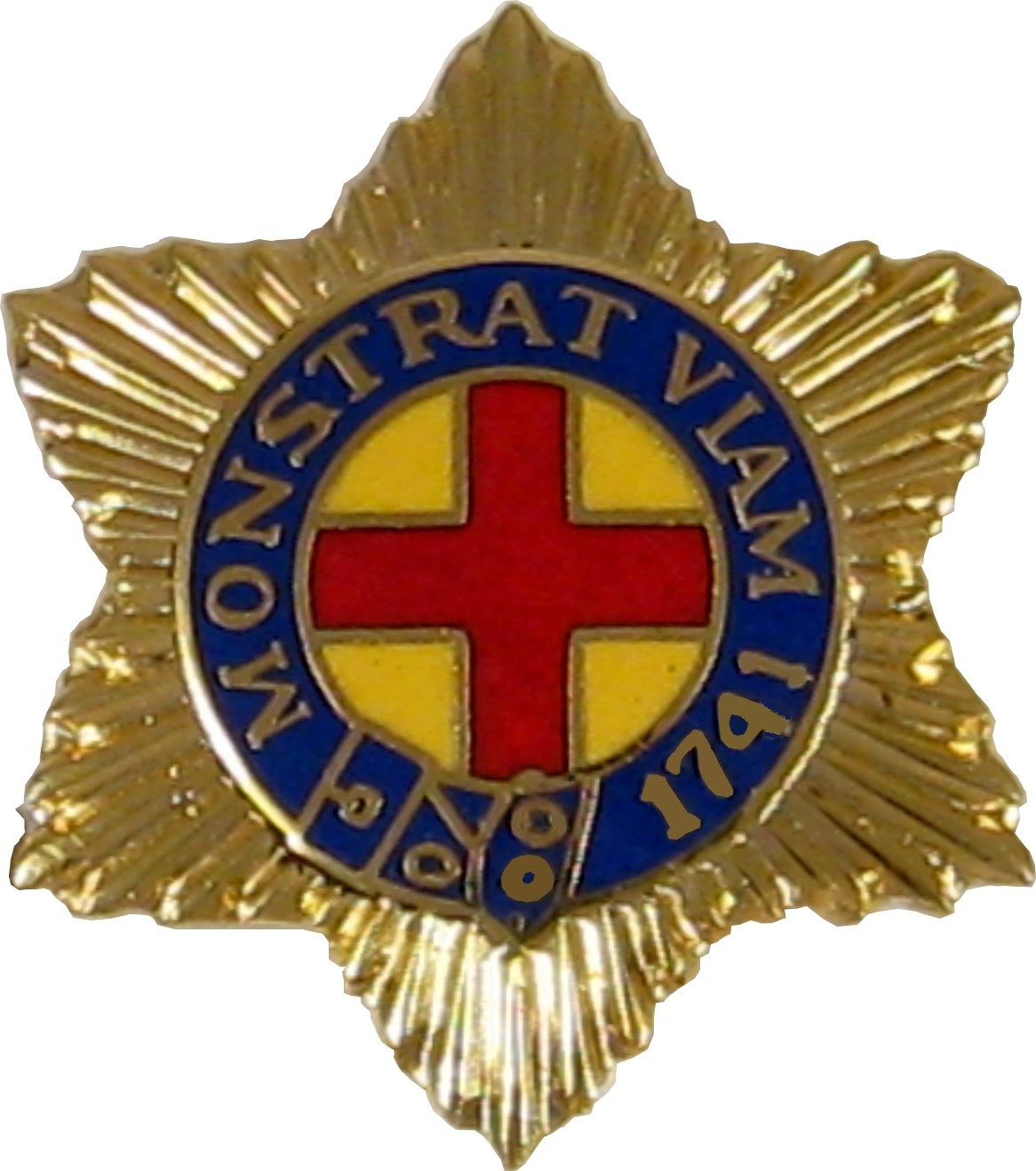
Distinctive Unit Insignia: 211 MP BN

Campaigns: Massachusetts 1814

The 972nd Military Police Company traces its history back to the Gloucester Artillery Battery, Battalion of Artillery, 1st Brigade, 2nd Division organized in 1787 in the Massachusetts Militia at Gloucester.

Under the command of Captain James S. Sayward, the Gloucester Artillery Battery was mustered into federal service on September 9, 1814, for service at Gloucester, and was mustered out on October 29, 1814.

During the late summer and autumn of 1814, following the British attacks on Washington and Baltimore, the British fleet off the east coast of the United States became much more active and were regularly threatening coastal communities with bombardment and invasion. The Gloucester Artillery was awarded credit for the Massachusetts 1814 Campaign for action against British Marines from HMS Leander attempting to land near Gloucester.

As in the case of the 772nd Military Police Company (see above), personnel from the 972nd Military Police Company wear the Distinctive Unit insignia of the 211th Military Police Battalion, the battalion in which it serves.

== 133rd Engineer Battalion (ARNG ME) ==
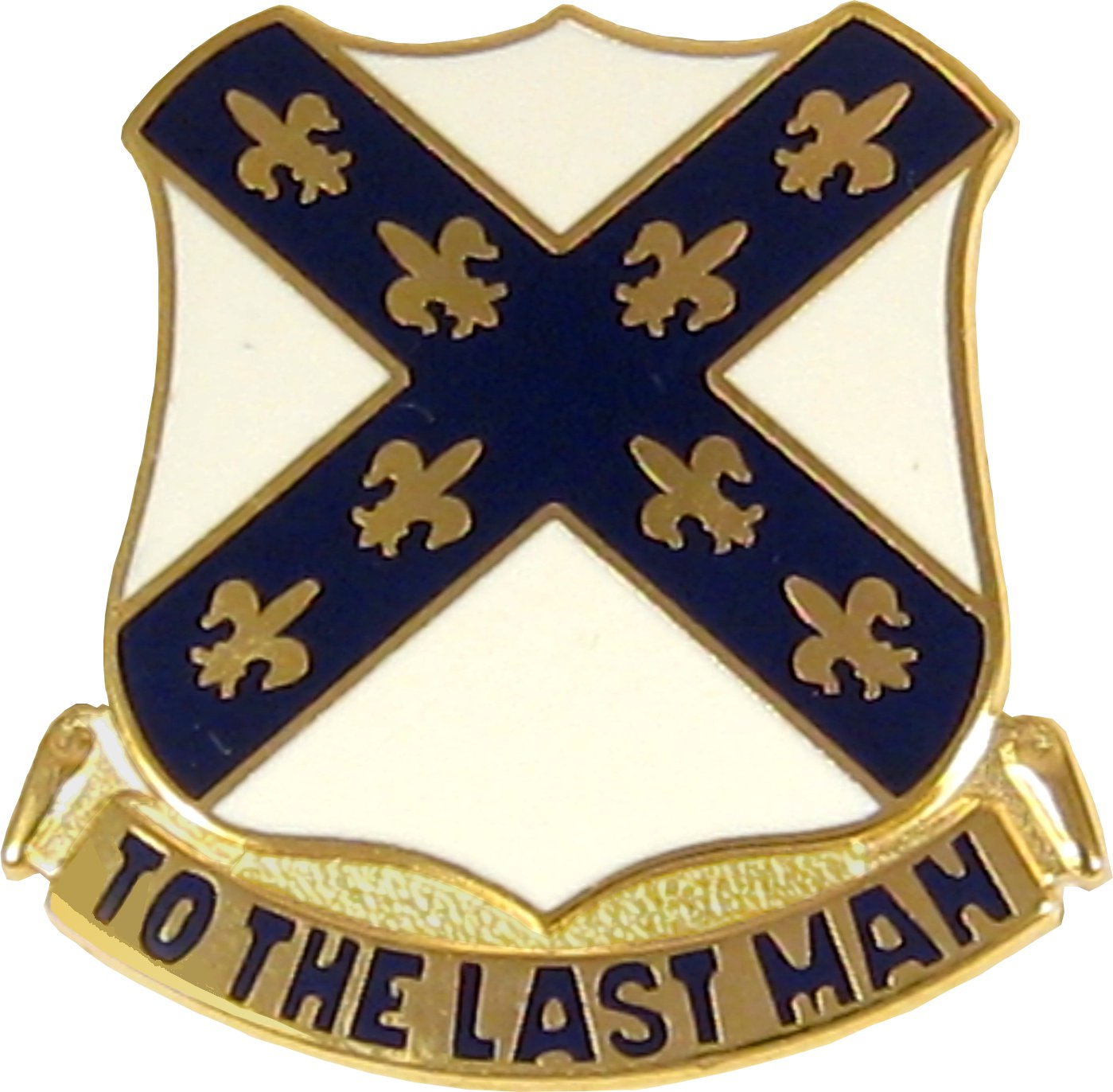
Distinctive Unit Insignia: 133 Eng Bn

Campaigns: Massachusetts 1812, 1813, 1814

Although the 133rd Engineer Battalion has a lineage that goes back only to 1854, the Headquarters Company traces its history to the formation of the Portland Light Infantry in 1803. By the War of 1812 the Portland Light Infantry had become Captain Nathaniel Shaw's Company, 3rd Regiment, 2nd Brigade, 12th Division in the Massachusetts Militia. The 3rd Regiment was mustered into federal service from September 7, 1814, through October 3, 1814, at Portland.

The population of the District of Maine, still a part of Massachusetts in 1812, was not enthusiastic about the War of 1812, and the lower part of the state, which shared the Mainers lack of enthusiasm for the war, was not in a good position to defend Maine against a serious campaign by the British or even to supply its militia. Indeed, much of the Maine coast down to Eastport was occupied by the British. As a consequence the defense of Maine fell to a small, poorly equipped militia.

Nonetheless, during the early autumn of 1814 when the British navy aggressively threatened coastal communities along the entire northeastern seaboard, the District of Maine Militia successfully defended Portland against a British invasion. The three campaign credits for the Headquarters Company/133rd Engineer Battalion were awarded to Captain Shaw's Company for its participation in the defense of Portland, while in both federal and state service, during the years 1812,1813 and 1814.

== 155th Infantry (ARNG MS) ==
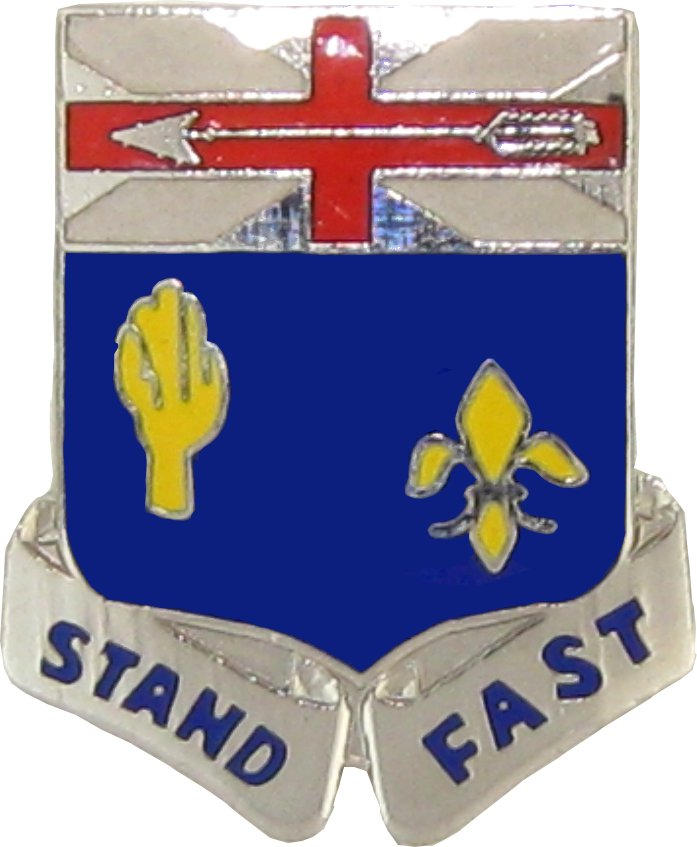
Distinctive Unit Insignia: 155 Inf

Campaigns: Florida 1814, New Orleans

The 155th Infantry traces its lineage back to the Legions of Militia, Upper and Lower Districts, Mississippi Territory, constituted on September 8, 1798. On October 25, 1798, the Legion of Militia of the Lower (or Southern) District was organized as the Militia of Adams County, which was reorganized and redesignated as the 1st Regiment, Mississippi Territorial Militia in 1802.

By the late summer of 1812, the 1st Regiment, Mississippi Territorial Militia had become the 1st Regiment, Mississippi Territorial Volunteers. Between early 1813 and mid–1814 the 1st Regiment underwent a number of reorganizations and redesignations, and spent a period of time in federal service between September 1812 and April 1814. But this service did not result in the award of any campaign credits for the War of 1812. The War of 1812 campaign credits awarded to the 155th Infantry were earned by six Mississippi militia units mustered into federal service from September 1814 through January 1815 for service in Major General Andrew Jackson's Coast Campaign: Lieutenant Colonel J. Carson's Regiment of Volunteer Mounted Gunmen, Lieutenant Colonel D. Neilson's Infantry Detachment, Lieutenant Colonel T. Hinds' Squadron of Light Dragoons, Captain J. C. Wilkins' Natchez Volunteer Rifle Corps, Captain Boyle's Company of Volunteer Mounted Spies, and Major J. P. Kennedy's Company of Choctaw Indians.

Of the six Mississippi militia units in the lineage of the 155th Infantry, Hinds' Dragoons was the one most involved in the Battle of New Orleans. During the night attack on December 23 the Dragoons provided valuable reconnaissance that located the British encampment on LaCoste's Plantation, and during the major battle on January 8 they were in reserve just one mile behind the breastworks that comprised Jackson's front line. The Dragoons also participated in the last land fighting of the battle during a skirmish with the British rear guard near the mouth of Bayou Bienvenue on January 25.

The cross in the chief (the upper third) of Distinctive Unit Insignia symbolizes service in the War of 1812.

== 113th Infantry (ARNG NJ) ==
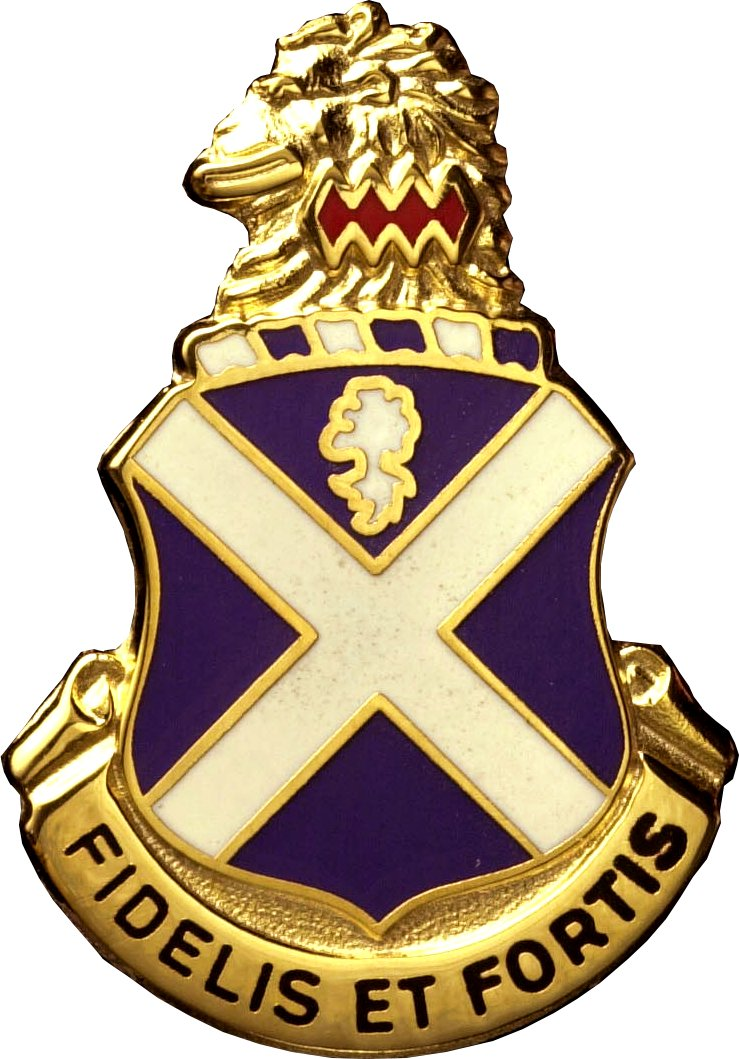
Distinctive Unit Insignia: 113 Inf

Campaigns: Streamer without inscription

The 113th Infantry traces its history back to the 1st New Jersey Regiment, which was organized in the Continental Army in part from existing militia companies from Essex County between October 26 and December 15, 1775. The regiment was assigned to the New Jersey Brigade for service in the American Revolution, during which it participated in ten campaigns. The regiment was reorganized and redesignated as the New Jersey Regiment on March 1, 1783, furloughed on June 6, 1783, and disbanded on November 15, 1783. In 1793 it was reorganized again in the New Jersey militia and expanded to form the Essex Brigade. Elements of the Essex Brigade were mustered into federal service during 1814.

Essex County is in northeastern New Jersey. Because of the proximity of this part of New Jersey to New York City, the New Jersey militia was an integral part of the force that defended New York Harbor against invasion by British warships. In addition to serving at strategically located fortifications along the New Jersey shore, such as Sandy Hook, Paulus Hook and the Highlands of Navesink, some New Jersey militia units were also posted to forts in New York, and a few were deployed on Delaware Bay. When not mustered into United States service, elements of the New Jersey militia were often deployed as independent militia by the governor to locations on the New Jersey coast.

== 53rd Army Digital Liaison Team (ARNG NY) ==
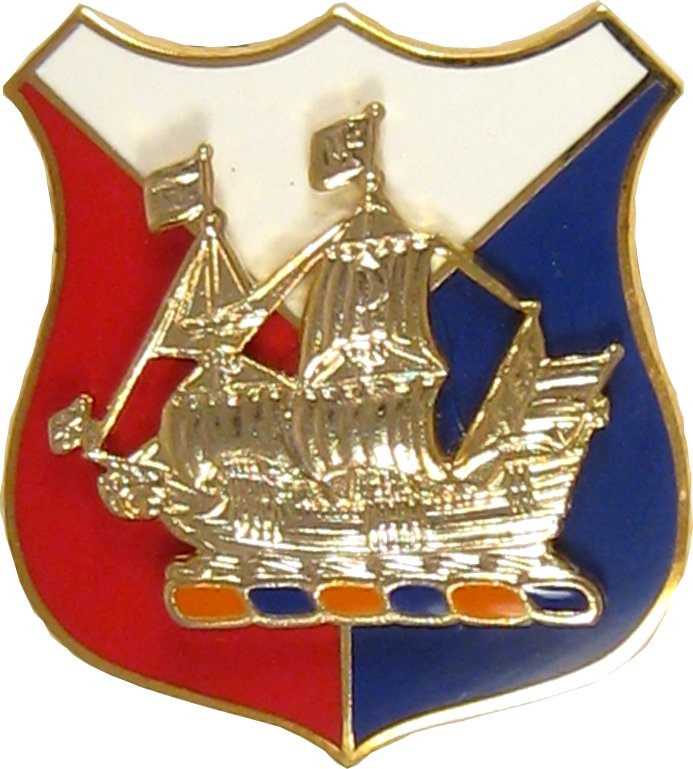
Distinctive Unit Insignia: 53 ADLT

Campaigns: Streamer without inscription

The 53rd Army Digital Liaison Team traces its origin to four companies of artillery, commanded by Captains Henry Morgan, James Hewitt, John Fleming and John Forbes, organized during May and June 1806 in New York City. The formation of these four companies was an impassioned reaction by the residents of New York City to the arrival in April off Sandy Hook of three British warships, which proceeded to board and search all American vessels entering New York Harbor. On April 25 over twenty American vessels entered the harbor, whereupon the British fired over a hundred shots at the Americans before boarding and searching as many as they could. The shelling caused the death of one sailor.

On July 26, 1806, these four artillery companies were assigned to the Battalion of Artillery, 1st Artillery Brigade, which was expanded and redesignated on April 5, 1807, as the 3rd Regiment of Artillery. The four aforementioned companies were reorganized and redesignated on August 25, 1808, as the 2nd Battalion, 3rd Regiment of Artillery, which was reorganized and redesignated as the 2nd Battalion, 11th Regiment of Artillery on June 13, 1812. This regiment was mustered into federal service twice during the War of 1812: September 15, 1812, through December 15, 1812, and September 2, 1814, through December 2, 1814.

During its first period of federal service, the 2nd Battalion, 11th Regiment was stationed on Ellis Island and Bedloe Island (later renamed Liberty Island); during its second stint, at the North Battery, a fort in New York City. The mobilization during the fall of 1814 was a response to increased activity of the British fleet along the eastern seaboard during the summer, followed by the raid on Washington and the attacks on Fort McHenry and Baltimore. These actions by the British stoked fears of attacks or invasions at other important ports on the East Coast. Following their decisive defeat at Baltimore, however, the British cut back on their activities in the Chesapeake Bay, with much of the fleet withdrawing to Jamaica and refitting for action along the Gulf Coast.

The 7th Regiment was the designation of the 53rd Army Digital Liaison Team from 1847 through 1917, at which time it was redesignated as the 107th Infantry. The 7th Regiment is one of the National Guard's most storied regiments. Indeed, it was the first militia unit to refer to itself as the "National Guard." This occurred in August 1825 when the 2nd Battalion, 2nd Regiment of Artillery, to honor the Marquis de Lafayette on the day of his departure from New York, adopted the name "National Guards" in honor of the Garde Nationale de Paris, which was at one time commanded by Lafayette. The "s" was soon dropped. In 1847 the unit was redesignated the 7th Regiment, and in 1862 the term "National Guard" was appropriated by the state for the uniformed militia.

Personnel of the 53rd Army Digital Liaison Team wear the Distinctive Unit Insignia of the New York Army National Guard Headquarters.

== 258th Field Artillery, (ARNG NY) ==
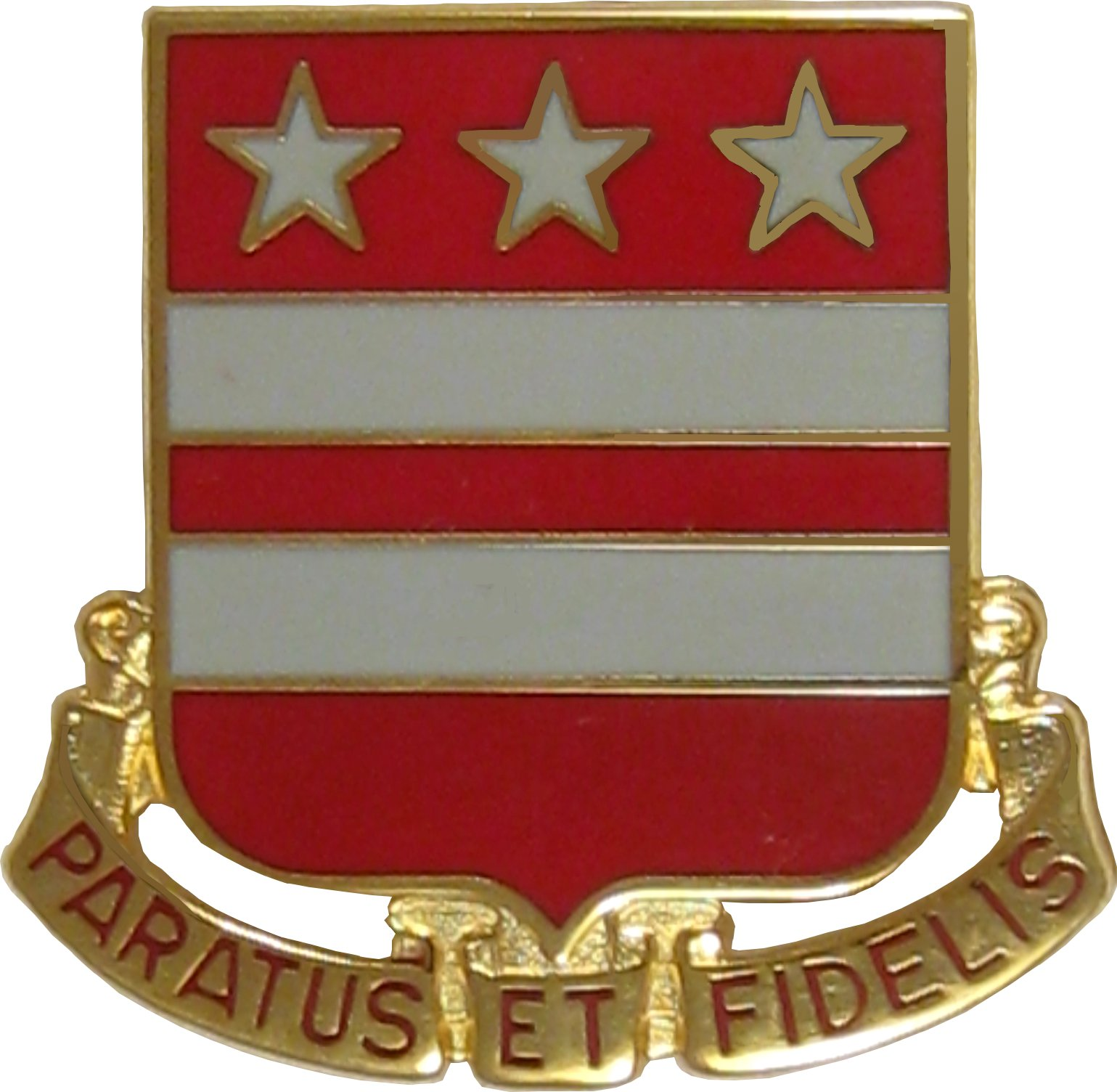
Distinctive Unit Insignia: 258 FA

Campaigns: Streamer without inscription

The 258th Field Artillery traces its lineage back to the 4th Regiment of Artillery, which was organized in the New York militia from existing units in New York City on October 9, 1809. On June 13, 1812, the 4th Regiment of Artillery was redesignated as the 3rd Regiment of Artillery. The 3rd Regiment of Artillery was mustered into federal service between September 15, 1812, and December 15, 1812, and again between September 2, 1814, and December 3, 1814.

The primary mission of the New York City militia units was to prevent the British from entering New York Harbor and possibly occupying the city. The defense of New York Harbor was organized around a series of forts constructed on islands in the harbor, including Bedloe Island and Governors Island, and a number of forts in the city. In addition, the defense of New York Harbor was augmented by several fortification constructed at strategic locations on the New Jersey shore. The batteries of the 3rd Regiment of Artillery were assigned to several of the New York forts during the course of the war.

== HHT/2-104th Cavalry (ARNG PA) ==
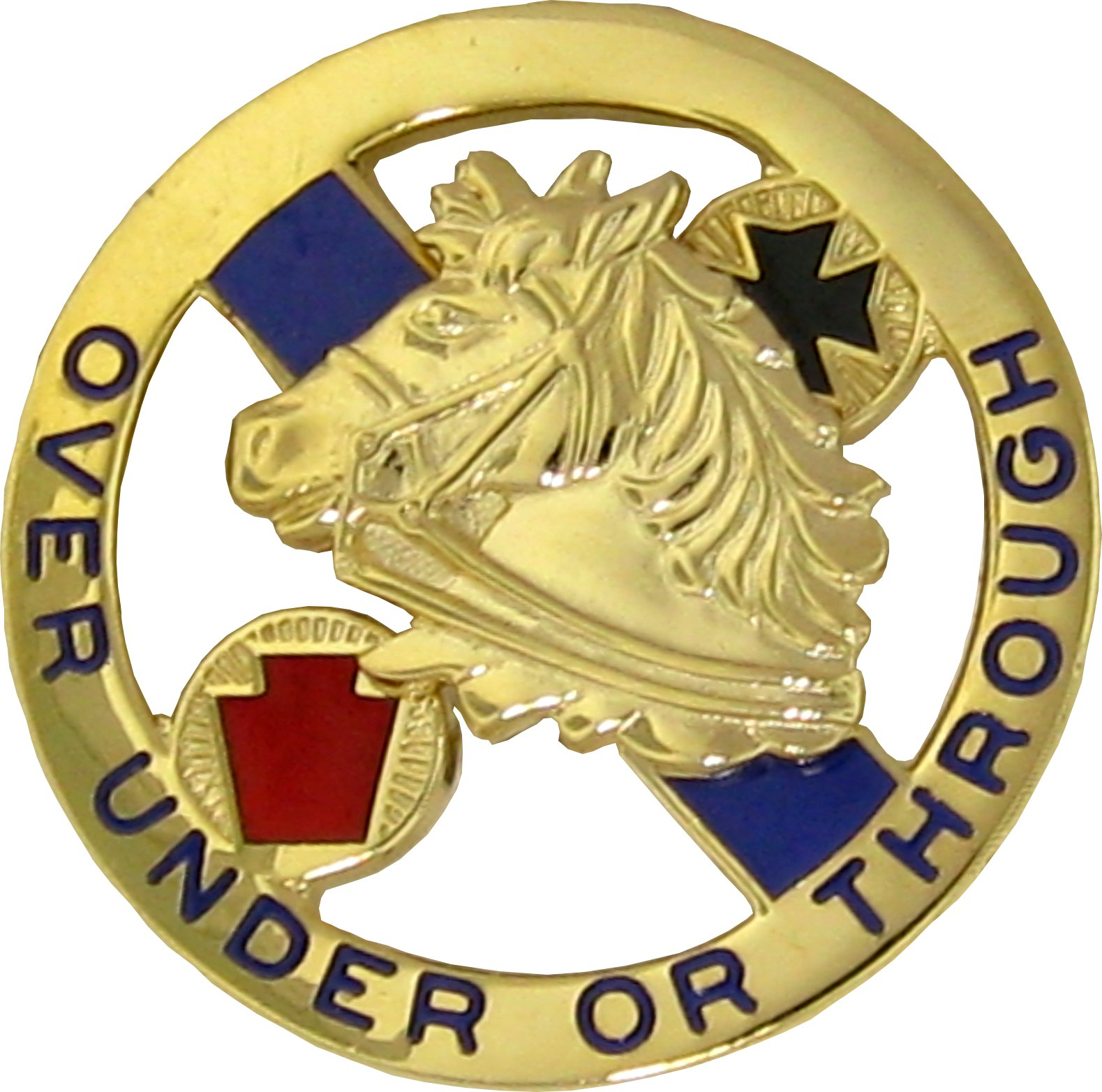
Distinctive Unit Insignia: 104 Cav

Campaigns: Streamer without inscription

The 104th Cavalry traces its beginnings to June 30, 1874, when it was constituted as the 8th Infantry Regiment, and organized in August of that same year in south-central Pennsylvania. However, the Headquarters and Headquarters Troop of the 2nd Squadron has a much earlier origin. The HHT/2-104th Cavalry traces its lineage back to the Reading Union Volunteers, organized on March 23, 1794. The Reading Union Volunteer served in the Whiskey Rebellion. During the War of 1812 the Reading Union Volunteers were mustered into federal service on September 12, 1814, as the Reading Washington (Guards) Blues, in response to the British attack on Fort McHenry and Baltimore, and mustered out on February 8, 1815.

The last four months of 1814 was a period of time when the British navy was very active all along the Atlantic coast, especially in the Chesapeake Bay, and the Americans feared attacks on its coastal cities. The Guards were initially ordered to Philadelphia to defend the city against a possible attack by the British that never materialized, after which they were attached to the Advance Light Brigade, 1st Regiment of Pennsylvania Volunteer Infantry and deployed along the Delaware River.

== 111th Infantry (ARNG PA) ==
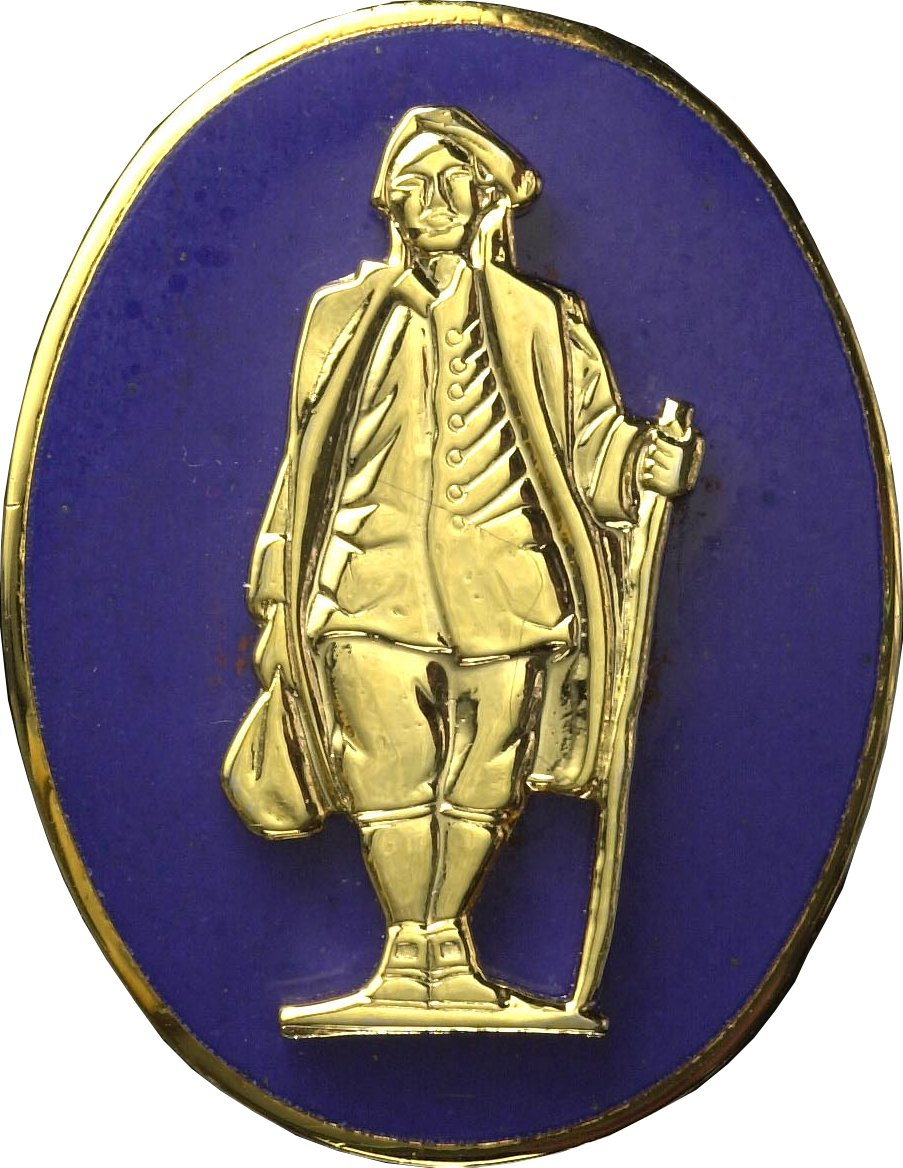
Distinctive Unit Insignia: 111 Inf

Campaigns: Streamer without inscription

The 111th Infantry traces its origins to the Associators, founded in 1747 in Philadelphia by Benjamin Franklin. The Associators were created as a volunteer militia unit to defend Philadelphia against French privateers operating on the Delaware River. In 1747 the Associators were reorganized, minus the artillery companies (which became the Train of Artillery of Philadelphia and ultimately the 103rd Engineer Battalion - see above), as the Associated Regiment of Foot of Philadelphia. In 1775 the Associated Regiment of Foot became the Associators of the City and Liberties of Philadelphia; and in 1777, the Philadelphia Brigade of Militia, which participated in four campaigns during the American Revolution. On April 11, 1793, the Philadelphia Brigade was reorganized as the 1st Brigade, 1st Division, which was mustered into federal service as the 1st Regiment on August 24, 1814, at Philadelphia and mustered out on January 4, 1815.

The period from mid-August 1814 until the end of the war was a time when the British naval forces on the Chesapeake Bay and Delaware Bay were very active, conducting the successful raid on Washington and the unsuccessful attack on Baltimore. The Pennsylvania militia units from the Philadelphia area that were federalized at this time were used to augment the defense of Baltimore and the Delaware River, but did not see action.

== 263rd Army Air and Missile Defense Command (ARNG SC) ==
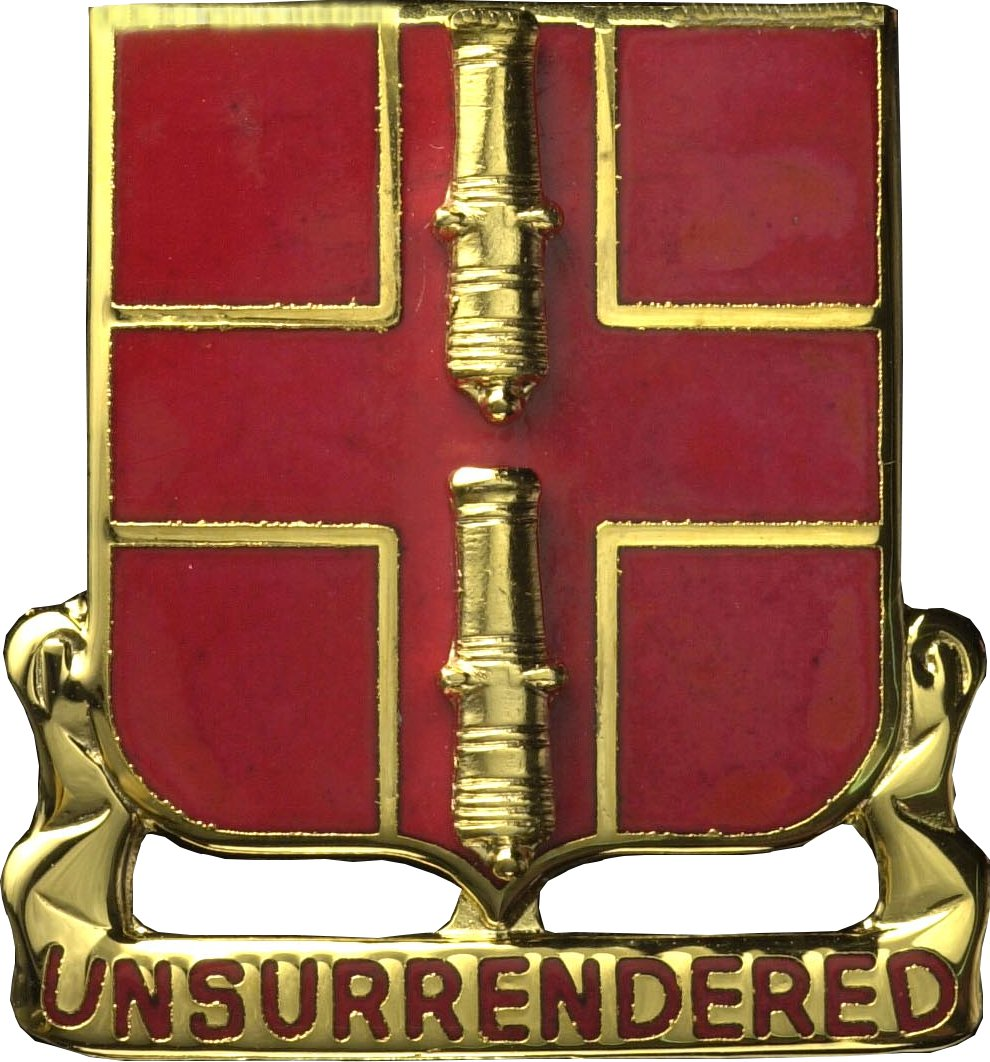
Distinctive Unit Insignia: 263 ADA

Campaigns: Streamer without inscription

The 263rd Army Air and Missile Defense Command traces its roots to the Artillery Company of Charles Town, organized in 1756 and chartered by the colony of South Carolina on July 31, 1760. In 1775 the Artillery Company was expanded, reorganized and redesignated as the Charles Town Battalion of Artillery, which served in the American Revolution until Charleston was surrendered to British forces on May 12, 1780. It was reconstituted in 1783 as the Charleston Battalion of Artillery. In 1794 the Charleston Battalion of Artillery became the 1st Regiment of Artillery. During the War of 1812 the Provisional Battalion, 1st Regiment of Artillery was mustered into federal service at Charleston on November 6, 1814, and mustered out on March 3, 1815, by which time the war had ended.

The mission of the Charleston militia was to defend the important port of Charleston from attack by British ships. At the time when the Provisional Battalion, 1st Regiment of Artillery was mustered into federal service late in 1814, there had been an increase in activity of the British fleet along the eastern seaboard, and a possible invasion was feared. However, Charleston was not attacked, and the Provisional Battery did not participate in any combat.

== HHT/2-183rd Cavalry (ARNG VA) ==
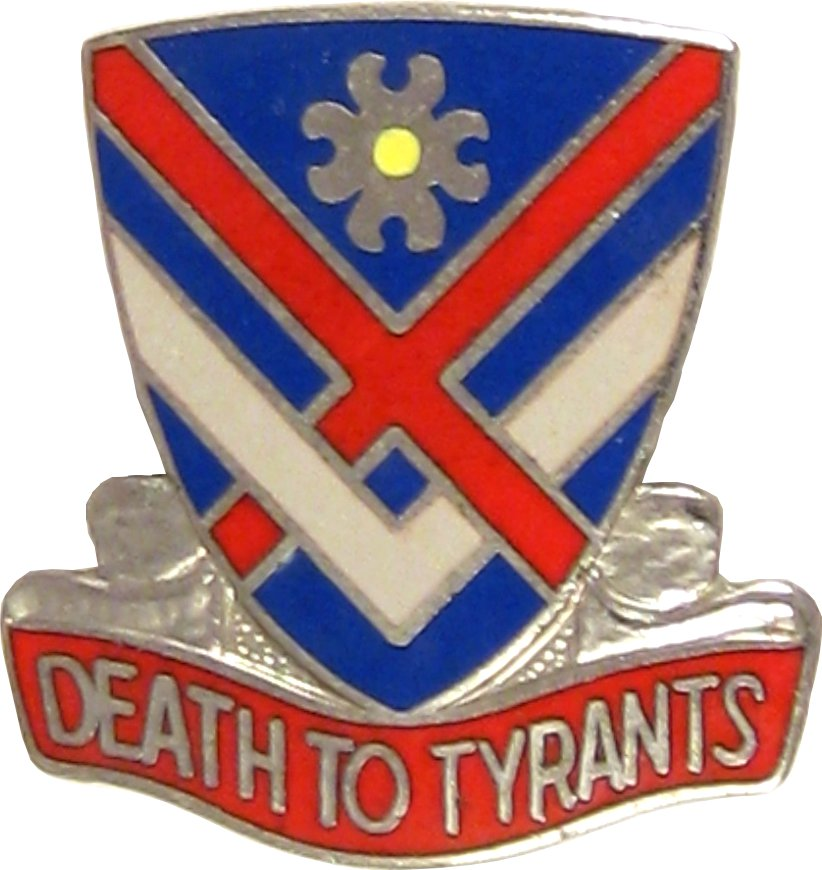
Distinctive Unit Insignia: 183 Cav

Campaigns: Virginia 1813

The 183rd Cavalry dates back only to 2005, when it was organized from former elements of the 111th Air Defense Artillery. However, the Headquarters and Headquarters Troop/2-183rd Cavalry is much older, having been derived from the Headquarters and Headquarters Battery/3-111th Air Defense Artillery, which has a lineage that goes back to 1792, when the Portsmouth Rifles was organized in Norfolk County as a company in the 7th Regiment, Virginia Militia.

Militia companies in the Norfolk area, including companies from the 7th Regiment, were mobilized in February and June 1813 for local defense, and again between August 1814 and February 1815 in anticipation of a British attempt to occupy Norfolk. In an action preliminary to the invasion of Norfolk, the British attempted a landing on Craney Island, a low-lying point of land near the mouth of the Elizabeth River, on June 22, 1813, where they were soundly defeated. Following their repulse at Craney Island, the British abandoned their plans to attack Norfolk and turned their attention to Portsmouth instead. When not mobilized, the Norfolk County units continued to serve as local defense units under county regimental authority.

== 276th Engineer Battalion (ARNG VA) ==
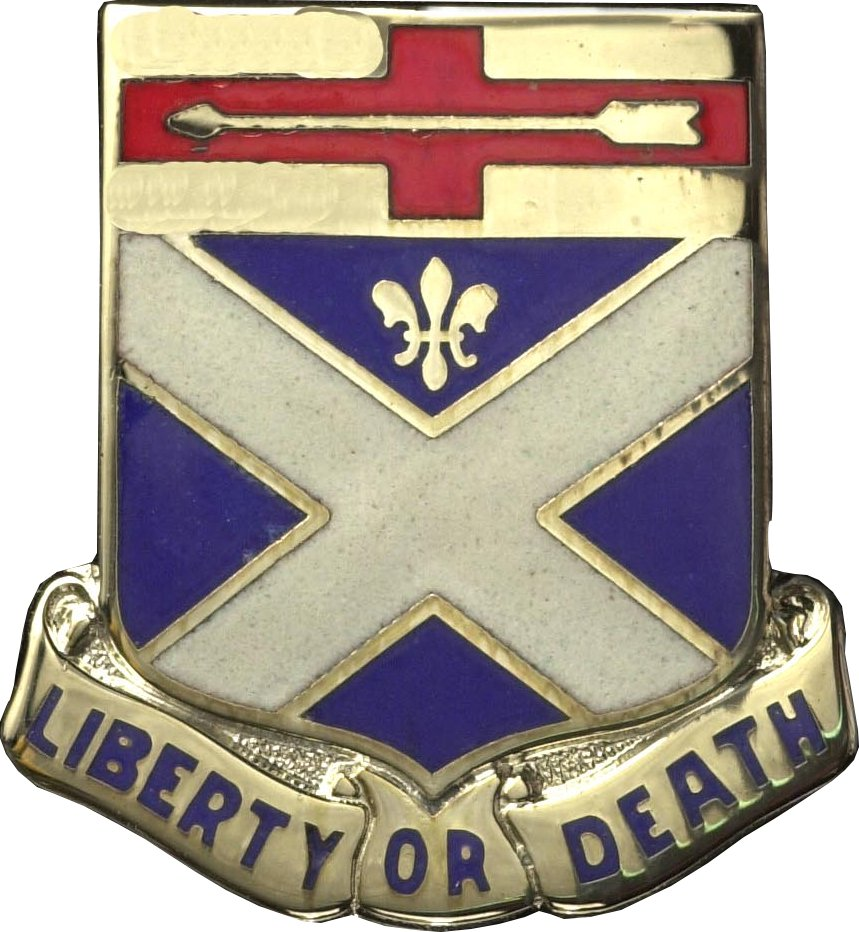
Distinctive Unit Insignia: 276 Eng Bn

Campaigns: Virginia 1813

The 276th Engineers trace their origin to the Richmond City Regiment organized in May 1791 from existing elements of the Virginia Militia. The Richmond City Regiment was reorganized and redesignated as the 19th Regiment on December 31, 1791. While remaining in state service, the 19th Regiment formed the First Corps d'Elite Brigade of Virginia Militia (Colonel Thomas Mann Randolph commanding), which was mustered into federal service in 1813 and mustered out in 1814. The First Corps d'Elite Brigade consisted of the Richmond Volunteers, the Flying Artillery (Captain William Wirt commanding), the Rifle Company (Captain William H. Richardson commanding) and the Richmond Light Infantry Blues.

The First Corps d'Elite Brigade, along with other Virginia militia units from Chesterfield and Henrico Counties, was federalized in March and June 1813, at a time when the British seemed to be preparing an invasion of Virginia along the James River and possibly even attacking Richmond. The invasion along the James never materialized, but the British did threaten Norfolk and Portsmouth. The threat to Norfolk ended when the British attempt to occupy Craney Island in June was soundly defeated (see HHT/2-183 Cavalry above). Some elements of the Richmond militia were mobilized again during the summer of 1814 and sent to Richmond and Norfolk, at a time when increased activity of the British fleet along the eastern seaboard had stoked invasion fears in coastal cities.

== 150th Cavalry (ARNG WV) ==
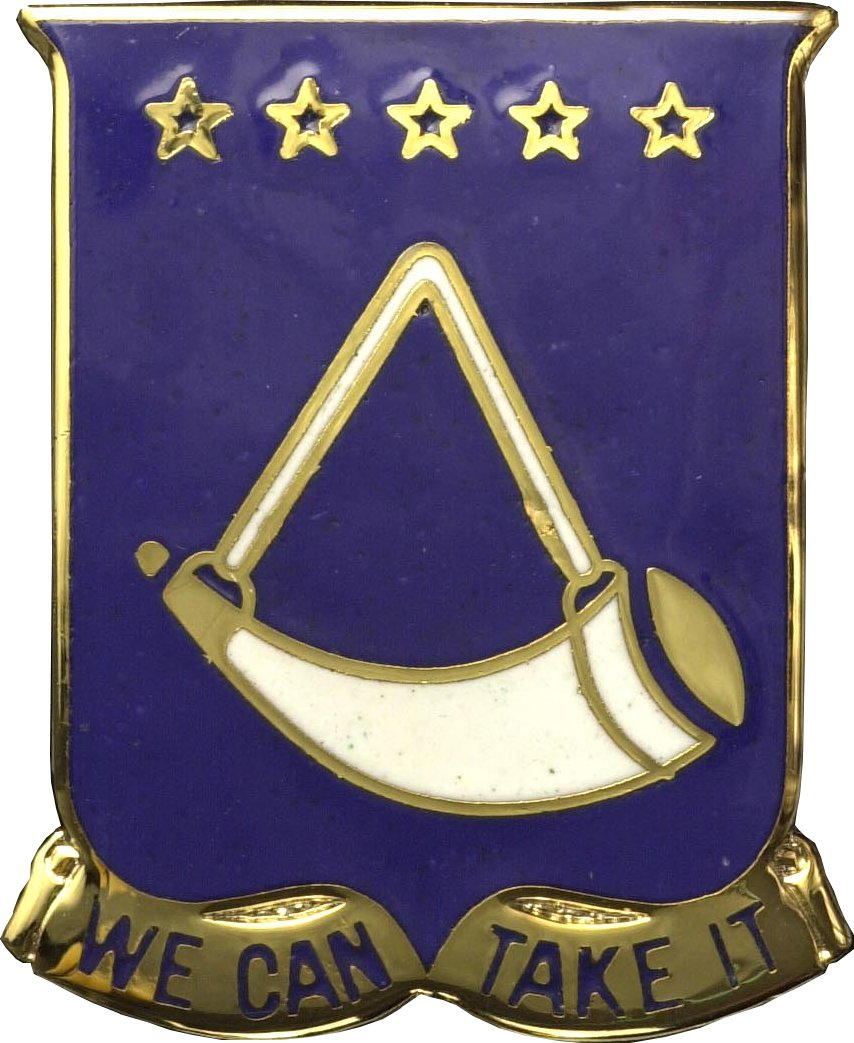
Distinctive Unit Insignia: 150 Cav

Campaigns: Indiana Territory 1812-1813

The 150th Cavalry traces its formation back to the Militia of Greenbrier County, Virginia, constituted in 1778 from Minutemen companies organized for frontier defense in 1777. Drafts from these companies provided Virginia regiments for the Continental Line during the period 1777 through 1782. In 1792 Greenbrier and Kanawha County militia units were reorganized as volunteer companies in the 13th Brigade, Virginia Militia.

In September 1812 five companies from the 13th Brigade from the part of Virginia that would later become Cabell, Greenbrier, Kanawha and Mason Counties in present-day southern West Virginia were consolidated with seven companies from the area that is currently northern West Virginia to form the 2nd Regiment, Virginia Volunteer Militia. These companies were separated again in 1863 when the new state of West Virginia reorganized its forces, and units from the southern counties (Cabell, Greenbrier, Kanawha and Mason Counties) became part of the 2nd Division (150th Cavalry lineage), while those from the northern part of the state (Hampshire, Harrison, Monongalia and Randolph Counties) were assigned to the 1st Division (201st Field Artillery lineage - see below).

During the War of 1812, companies from the 2nd Regiment served at Richmond and Norfolk and in Ohio and the Indiana Territory with the Army of the Northwest. Virginia companies aided in the construction of Fort Meigs near the Maumee Rapids, but were not present when the fort was attacked by Indians and the British in the spring of 1813. War of 1812 campaign credit for the 150th Cavalry was awarded for service in the Indiana Territory.

One of the five stars in the Distinctive Unit Insignia commemorates service during the War of 1812.

== 201st Field Artillery (ARNG WV) ==
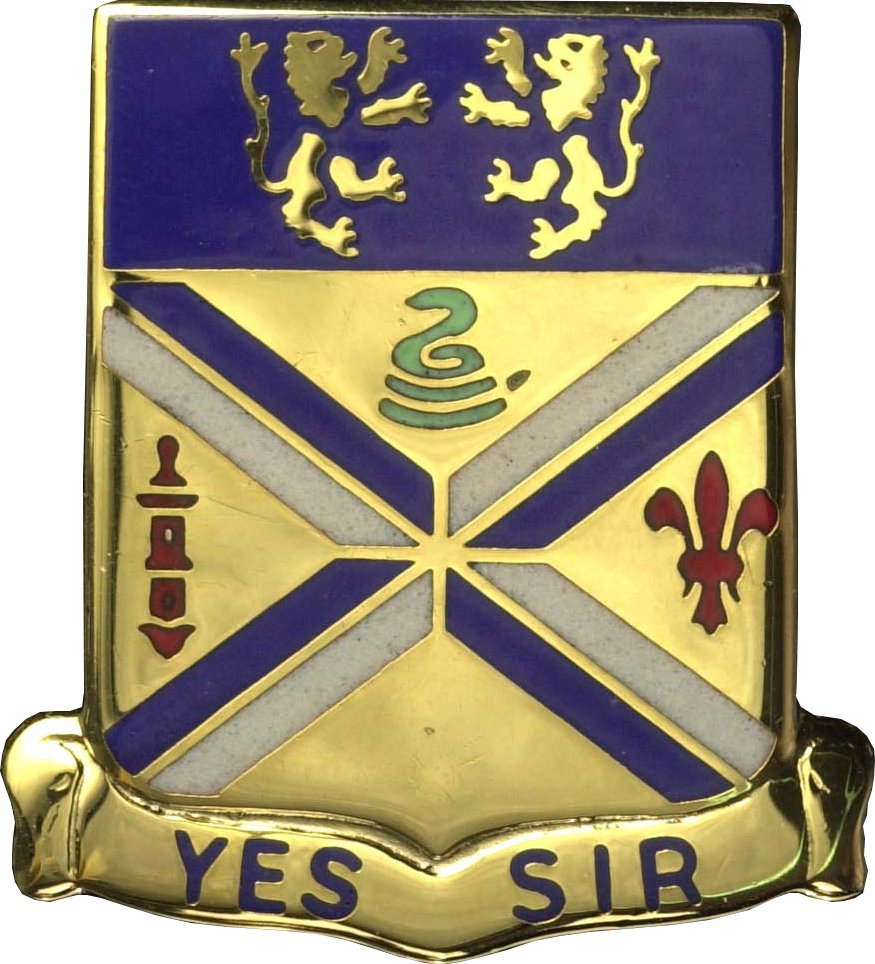
Distinctive Unit Insignia: 201 FA

Campaigns: Indiana Territory 1812-1813

The 201st Field Artillery traces its origin to militia companies formed in the northern and western part of the Virginia Colony, the earliest of which was Captain Morgan Morgan's Company of Volunteer Militia of Orange Country, Virginia, organized on February 17, 1735. During the Revolutionary War several militia companies from this part of Virginia were organized for frontier defense and for service in Virginia regiments of the Continental Line. One such company, Capt. Hugh Stephenson's Company of Virginia Riflemen, which was organized in 1775, became a part of the 1st Virginia Regiment, American Continental Troops and earned credit for participation in the Boston and New York (1776) campaigns. In 1792 the militia companies from this part of Virginia were reorganized as companies in the 1oth and 16th Brigades, Virginia Militia, which served in the Whiskey Rebellion in 1794.

In September 1812 seven companies from the 10th and 16th Brigades, from counties in northern Virginia that would later become Hampshire, Harrison, Monongalia and Randolph Counties in West Virginia, were combined with five from what is now southern West Virginia (see 150th Armor above) to form the 2nd Regiment, Virginia Volunteer Militia, thereby combining the lineages of the 150th Cavalry and 201st Field Artillery. The lineages of the 150th Cavalry and 201st Field Artillery were separated again in 1863 when companies from the northern part of the new state of West Virginia were reorganized as companies in the 1st Division, West Virginia Militia (201st Field Artillery lineage), while those from the southern part of the state were assigned to the 2nd Division (150th Cavalry lineage).

During the War of 1812 most of the troops from companies in the lineages of the 201st Field Artillery served in the Army of the Northwest in 1812 and 1813, but some also served at Richmond and Norfolk.

The two lions in the Distinctive Unit Insignia represent service in the American Revolution and the War of 1812.

== See also ==
- List of Regular Army units with campaign credit for the War of 1812
- List of United States Army units with colonial roots

== Notes ==
Date of origin, organizational history, dates of federal service during the War of 1812 and, in some cases, locations of service were obtained from the Lineage and Honors Certificate issued for each unit by the United States Army Center of Military History, Department of the Army, located at Fort Lesley J. McNair, Washington, DC.
