= 25th Continental Regiment =

Gardner's Regiment Bond's Regiment 25th Continental Regiment
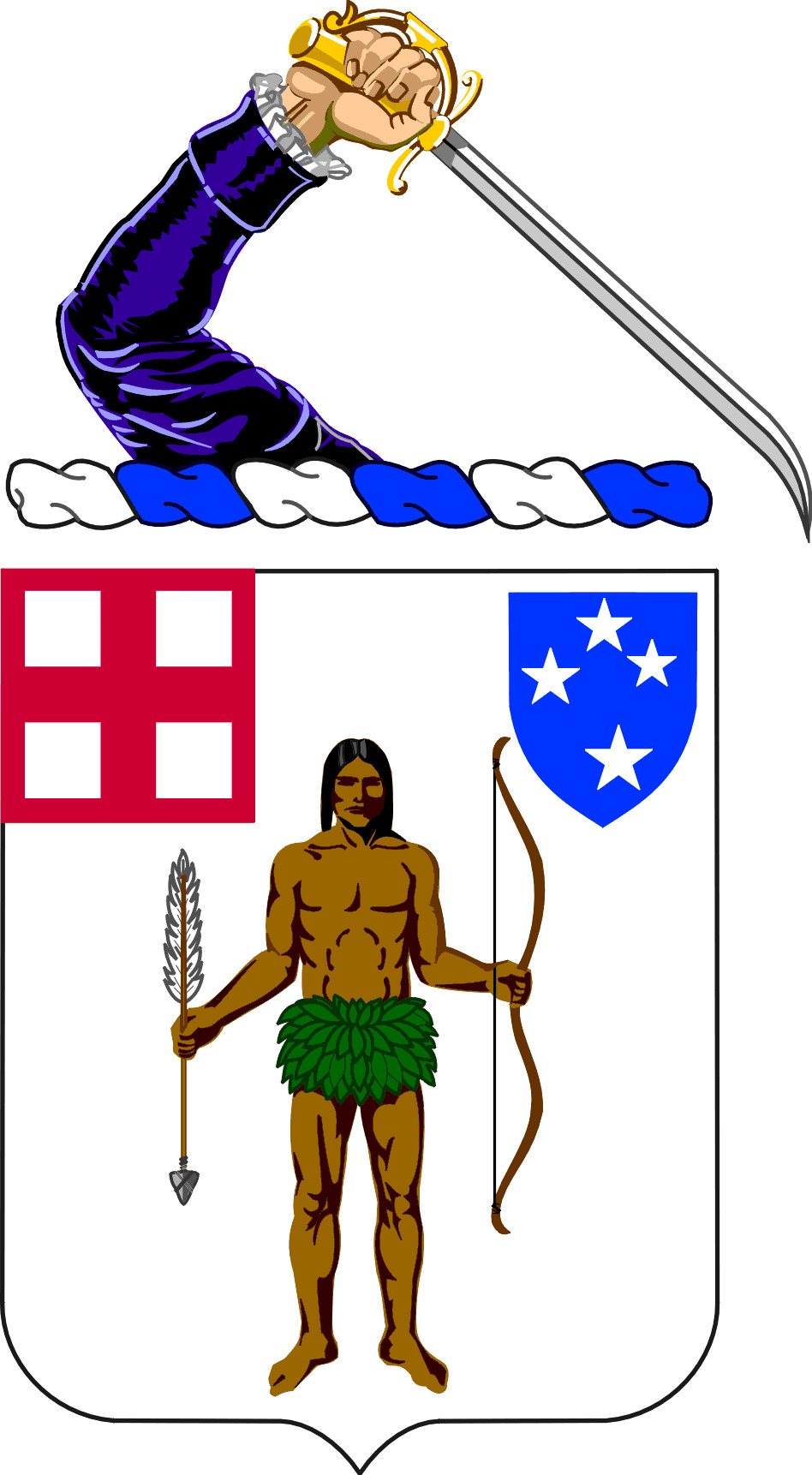
- 182nd Cavalry Coat of Arms
- Active: 1775-1777
- Allegiance: Continental Congress of the United States
- Type: Infantry
- Part of: Massachusetts Line
- Motto(s): "Avitos Juvamus Honores" (We Uphold Our Ancient Honors)
- Engagements: Battle of Bunker Hill; Siege of Boston, Invasion of Canada, Battle of Valcour Island.

Commanders
- Notable commanders: Colonel Thomas Gardner; Colonel William Bond

The 25th Continental Regiment, also known as Gardner's and Bond's Regiment, was raised April 23, 1775, as a Massachusetts militia Regiment at Cambridge, Massachusetts, under Colonel Thomas Gardner. Colonel Gardner was mortally wounded at the Battle of Bunker Hill, in June 1775, and command was transferred to Lieutenant Colonel William Bond, who was promoted to Colonel. The regiment would join the Continental Army in June 1775. The regiment saw action during the Siege of Boston, Invasion of Canada and the Battle of Valcour Island. The regiment was put into the 3rd Massachusetts brigade. It fought at the Battles of Saratoga on the extreme right of the American right flank, close to the river fortifications next to the hudson river. The regiment was disbanded on January 1, 1777, at Morristown, New Jersey.

The regiment traces its beginning to 1636 "North Regiment"; the 25th Continental Regiment is now the 182nd Infantry Regiment (United States).
