= Thomas Gardner (politician) =

American political figure and soldier (1724–1775)

Personal details
- Born: 1724 Cambridge, Province of Massachusetts Bay
- Died: July 3, 1775 (aged 50) Massachusetts, Province of Massachusetts Bay

Military service
- Branch/service: Continental Army
- Rank: Colonel
- Commands: Gardner's Massachusetts Regiment
- Battles/wars: American Revolutionary War: Battle of Bunker Hill

Thomas Gardner (1724 – July 3, 1775) was an American politician and soldier.

== Early and personal life ==
Gardner was born in Cambridge, Massachusetts. He was a descendant of Thomas Gardner of Roxbury. In 1755, he married Joanna Sparhawk, a member of one of Brighton's founding families.

== Career ==
Gardner, a political figure in Massachusetts on the eve of the American Revolution, was in the forefront of those urging resistance to the King's dissolution of the General Court in 1774, following the Boston Tea Party. He was chosen to represent Cambridge in the Middlesex County Convention, called to consider measures for public safety, as well as in the First and Second provincial Congresses. In May 1775 he was elected to the Revolutionary Council of Safety.

During the spring of 1775, he was commissioned a Colonel of a regiment he had organized largely at his own expense. Gardner's rapid rise to prominence ended when he was mortally wounded at the Battle of Bunker Hill, in June 1775.

== Death ==
On the date of his death, July 3, 1775, Gardner was the second-highest ranking American officer killed at Bunker Hill. His funeral services were attended by General George Washington.

Gardner is the namesake of Gardner Street in Boston, Massachusetts, the Gardner Pilot Academy school, and the city of Gardner, Massachusetts, in 1785.
