= Vermont =

U.S. state

- State
- Flag Seal
- Nickname: The Green Mountain State
- Motto(s): Freedom and Unity and Stella quarta decima fulgeat (May the fourteenth star shine bright)
- Anthem: These Green Mountains
- Location of Vermont within the United States
- Country: United States
- Before statehood: Vermont Republic
- Admitted to the Union: March 4, 1791; 235 years ago (14th)
- Capital: Montpelier
- Largest city: Burlington
- Largest county or equivalent: Chittenden
- Largest metro and urban areas: Burlington

Government
  - Governor: Phil Scott (R)
  - Lieutenant Governor: John S. Rodgers (R)
- Legislature: General Assembly
  - Upper house: Senate
  - Lower house: House of Representatives
- Judiciary: Vermont Supreme Court
- U.S. senators: Bernie Sanders (I) (Note: While Sanders is a registered independent, he has caucused with Democrats since 1995.); Peter Welch (D)
- U.S. House delegation: Becca Balint (D) (list)

Area
  - Total: 9,623 sq mi (24,923 km^{2})
  - Land: 9,217 sq mi (23,871 km^{2})
  - Water: 400 sq mi (1,035 km^{2}) 4.2%
  - Rank: 45th

Dimensions
  - Length: 160 mi (260 km)
  - Width: 81 mi (130 km)
- Elevation: 980 ft (300 m)
- Highest elevation (Mount Mansfield (Note: Elevation adjusted to North American Vertical Datum of 1988)): 4,400 ft (1,340 m)
- Lowest elevation (Lake Champlain): 95 ft (29 m)

Population (2025)
  - Total: ▼644,663
  - Rank: 49th
  - Density: 70/sq mi (27/km^{2})
  - Rank: 31st
  - Median household income: $81,200 (2023)
  - Income rank: 17th
- Demonym: Vermonter

Language
  - Official language: None
  - Spoken language: English: 94.4%; French: 2%; Other: 3.6%
- Time zone: UTC−05:00 (Eastern)
  - Summer (DST): UTC−04:00 (EDT)
- USPS abbreviation: VT
- ISO 3166 code: US-VT
- Traditional abbreviation: Vt.
- Latitude: 42°44′ N to 45°1′ N
- Longitude: 71°28′ W to 73°26′ W
- Website: vermont.gov

State symbols of Vermont
List of state symbols
- Coat of arms of Vermont

Living insignia
- Amphibian: Northern leopard frog Rana pipiens
- Bird: Hermit thrush Catharus guttatus
- Fish: Brook trout Salvelinus fontinalis Walleye; Sander vitreous vitreous
- Flower: Red clover Trifolium pratense
- Insect: Western honey bee Apis mellifera
- Mammal: Morgan horse
- Mushroom: Bear's head tooth mushroom Hericium americanum
- Reptile: Painted turtle
- Tree: Sugar maple Acer saccharum

Inanimate insignia
- Beverage: Milk
- Food: Apple pie
- Fossil: Woolly mammoth, beluga whale
- Gemstone: Grossular garnet
- Mineral: Talc
- Rock: Granite, marble, slate
- Soil: Tunbridge

State route marker

State quarter
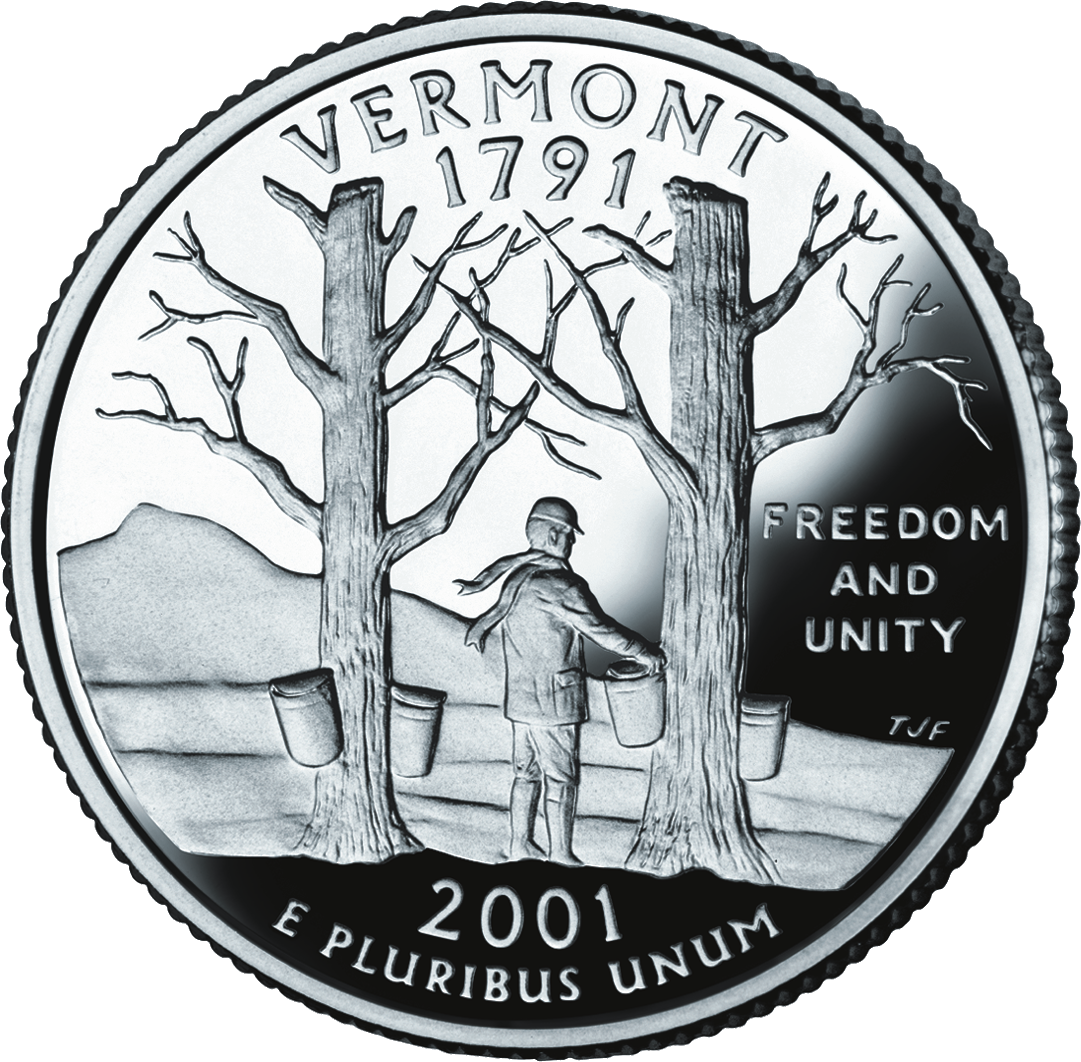
- Released in 2001

Vermont (/vərˈmɒnt/) is a landlocked state in the New England region of the Northeastern United States. It borders Massachusetts to the south, New Hampshire to the east, New York to the west, and the Canadian province of Quebec to the north. According to the most recent U.S. census estimates, the state has an estimated population of 644,663, making it the second-least populated of all U.S. states. It is the nation's sixth-smallest state by total area. The state's capital, Montpelier, is the least populous U.S. state capital. No other U.S. state has a most populous city with fewer residents than Vermont's most populous city, Burlington.

Native Americans have inhabited the area for about 12,000 years. The competitive tribes of the Algonquian-speaking Abenaki and Iroquoian-speaking Mohawk were active in the area at the time of European encounter. During the 17th century, French colonists claimed the territory as part of New France. Conflict arose when the Kingdom of Great Britain began to settle colonies to the south along the Atlantic coast; France was defeated in 1763 in the Seven Years' War, ceding its territory east of the Mississippi River to Britain. Thereafter, the nearby British Thirteen Colonies disputed the extent of the area called the New Hampshire Grants to the west of the Connecticut River, encompassing present-day Vermont. The provincial government of New York sold land grants to settlers in the region, which conflicted with earlier grants from the government of New Hampshire. The Green Mountain Boys militia protected the interests of the established New Hampshire land grant settlers. Ultimately, a group of settlers with New Hampshire land grant titles established the Vermont Republic in 1777 as an independent state during the American Revolutionary War. The Vermont Republic abolished slavery before any other U.S. state. It was admitted to the Union in 1791 as the 14th state.

The geography of the state is marked by the Green Mountains, which run north–south up the middle of the state, separating Lake Champlain and other valley terrain on the west from the Connecticut River Valley that defines much of its eastern border. A majority of its terrain is forested with hardwoods and conifers. The state has warm, humid summers and cold, snowy winters.

Vermont's economic activity of $40.6 billion in 2022 is ranked last on the list of U.S. states and territories by GDP, but 21st in GDP per capita. Known for its progressivism, the state was one of the first in the U.S. to recognize same-sex civil unions and marriage, has the highest proportion of renewable electricity generation at 99.9%, and is one of the least religious and least racially/ethnically diverse states. Dairy, forestry, maple syrup, and wine are important sectors in Vermont's agricultural economy. Vermont produces approximately 50% of the nation's maple syrup.

== Toponymy ==
The 17th-century French explorer Samuel de Champlain is sometimes credited with coining the name Vermont, but it did not in fact appear until 1777, when, at the suggestion of Thomas Young, it was adopted as the name of the Vermont Republic (replacing New Connecticut, the name the republic had borne for the first six months of its existence). It represents a French translation of Green Mountain(s), the name of the mountain range that bisects the state. The latter name first appeared in 1772 in the context of the Green Mountain Boys.

== History ==
=== Pre-colonial ===
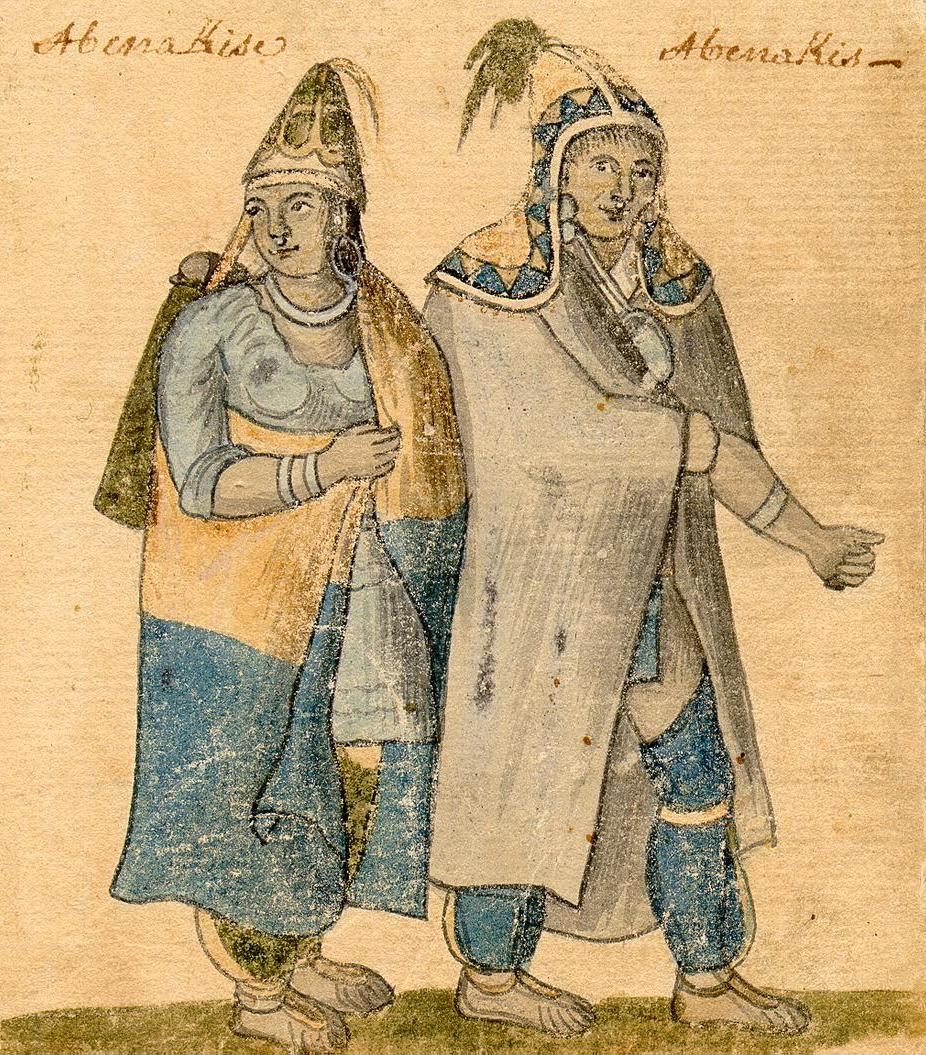
Watercolor of Abenaki couple, 1700s

The first humans to inhabit what is now Vermont arrived about 11,000 years ago, as the glaciers of the last ice age receded. Small groups of hunter-gatherers followed herds of caribou, elk, and mastodon through the grasslands of the Champlain Valley. At that time much of the region was mixed tundra. The oldest human artifacts are 11,000 year old projectile points found along the eastern shore of the saltwater Champlain Sea. This time is known as the Paleo-Indian period.

By about 8,000 years ago, the Champlain Sea had become the freshwater Lake Champlain and the climate was more temperate, bringing increased diversity of flora and fauna. This was the beginning of the Archaic period. By about 4,300 years ago, the forests were as they are today. Large mammals underwent extinction or migrated north, and the human population became reliant on smaller game and plants. People developed fishing equipment and stone cookware, and practiced woodworking and food storage. They had time for travel, leisure, and performed elaborate ceremonies. Most of the state's territory was occupied by the Abenaki, south-western parts were inhabited by the Mohicans and south-eastern borderlands by the Pocumtuc and the Pennacook.

Over 3,000 years ago, the Woodland period began. Food was increasingly sourced from domesticated plants, including maize, beans, and squash. Agriculture meant a change from dispersed hunter-gatherering towards the establishment of larger settlements. Pottery was made from local clay, and tools were made from chert found along the Winooski River. Canoes were used for fishing and travel.

The arrival of European explorers in the 1600s marked the end of the Woodland period and the beginning of the Abenaki. At that time, there were about 10,000 Indigenous people in what is now Vermont, of whom an estimated 75–90% were killed by European diseases like smallpox. Survivors moved north to New France or assimilated with European settlers. Today, there are no Indian reservations in Vermont. In 2021, 0.2% of live births in Vermont were to American Indian people.

Nearly all information about the Pre-Columbian era of Vermont is from found artifacts. About 750 prehistoric sites are known in Vermont, but few have been excavated by archaeologists, and those on private property benefit from no legal protection.

Several native toponyms survive in the state, including Lake Bomoseen, Lake Memphremagog, Missisquoi River, Monadnock Mountain, and Winooski.

=== Colonial ===
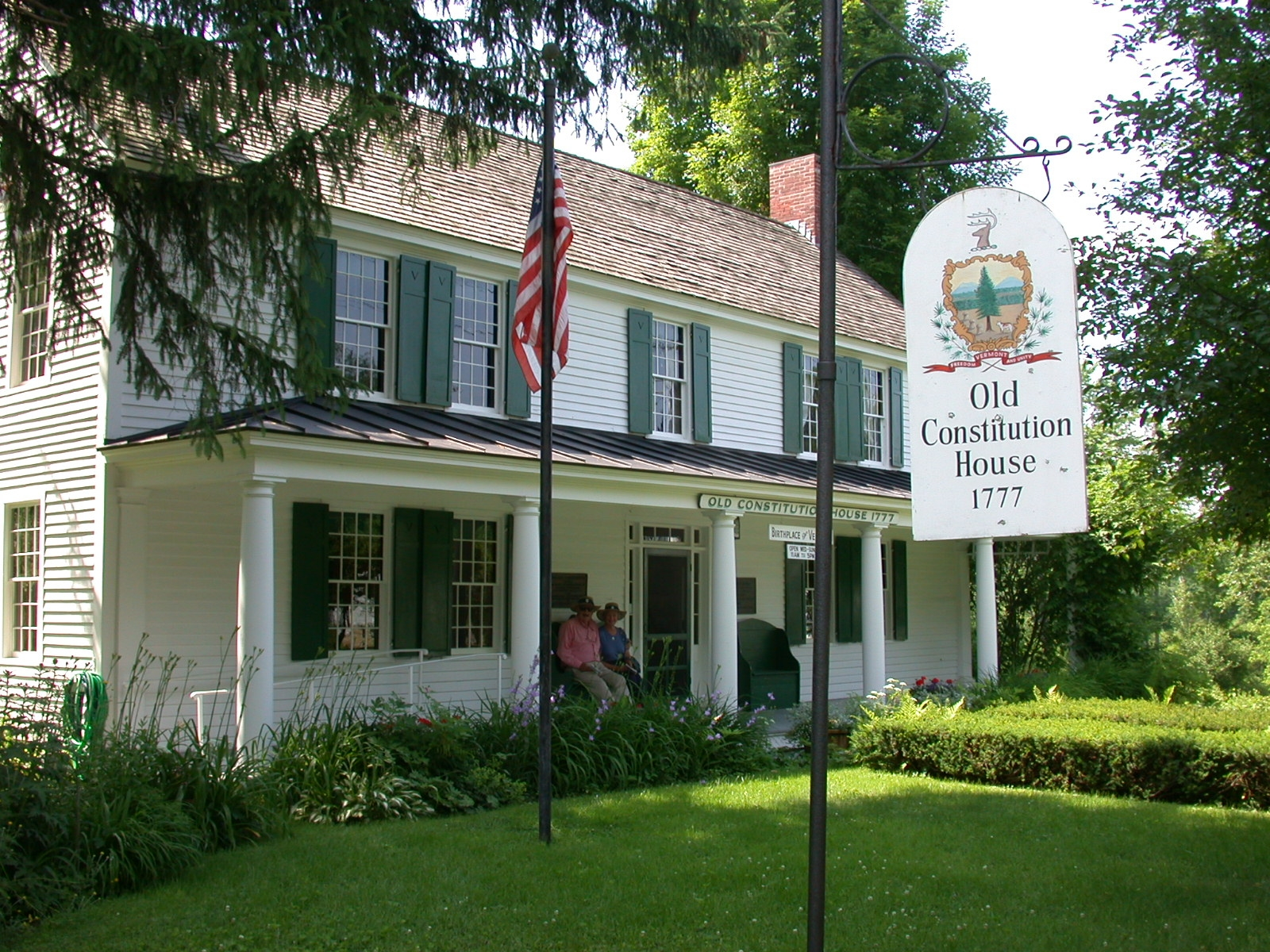
The Old Constitution House at Windsor, where the Constitution of Vermont was adopted on July 8, 1777

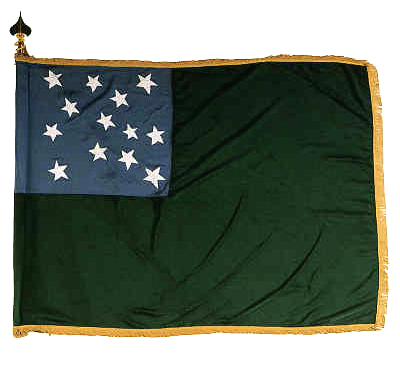
A c.1775 flag used by the Green Mountain Boys

In 1609, Samuel de Champlain led the first European expedition to Lake Champlain. He named the lake after himself and made the first known map of the area. Portions of the land that is now Vermont remained part of New France until 1763.

The French had a military presence around Lake Champlain, since it was an important waterway, but they did very little colonization. In 1666, they built Fort Sainte Anne on Isle La Motte to defend Canada from the Haudenosaunee. It was abandoned by 1670. A short-lived settlement existed at Pointe à l'Algonquin, now Windmill Point, Alburgh. A village with a church, saw mill and fifty huts existed at the present site of Swanton. Much of the eastern shore of Lake Champlain was mapped out with seigniories, but settlers were unwilling to populate the area, possibly because of continual warfare and raiding there.

The English also made unsuccessful attempts to colonize the area in the 1600s. In 1724, they built Fort Dummer near what is now Brattleboro, but it remained a small and isolated outpost, often under attack by the Abenaki.

With the 1763 Treaty of Paris, France ceded its claims east of the Mississippi River to the Kingdom of Great Britain, making the area more attractive to European settlement. At the same time, New England was overcrowded; new land was needed for settlement. The territory west of the Connecticut River was the last unsettled part of New England, and both the Province of New Hampshire and the Province of New York laid claim to it.

In 1749, New Hampshire governor Benning Wentworth began to auction land in an uncolonized area between Lake Champlain and the Connecticut River. This area became known as the New Hampshire Grants. This westward expansion aimed to expand New Hampshire's tax base and secure rights to local timber resources, specifically White Pine.

There were eventually 135 New Hampshire Grants. The first of Benning Wentworth's grants included a town named after himself: Bennington. A typical town, it was 6 square miles (16 km^{2}), contained 48 lots, with land set aside for a school, a church, and a town center. Five hundred acres of the best land was kept by Wentworth for later resale.

Settlers came from across New England, and were obliged to "Plant and Cultivate Five Acres of Land" within five years. Some settlers kept to the agreement and started farms. Others, like Ethan Allen, did not. They wanted to sell the land for profit. Those who purchased New Hampshire Grants ran into disagreements with New York, which began selling off the same land as land patents.

In 1764, King George III proclaimed the territory to be under the jurisdiction of New York, which meant that the New Hampshire Grant landowners did not have legal title. Meanwhile, New York continued selling large tracts of land, many of which overlapped with those already inhabited. The dispute led to Ethan Allen forming the Green Mountain Boys, an illicit militia that attacked New York settlers and speculators through arson and mob violence. They eventually repelled the New Yorkers, and went on, with Benedict Arnold, to fight in the American Revolutionary War, where they captured Fort Ticonderoga from the British.

=== Sovereignty ===
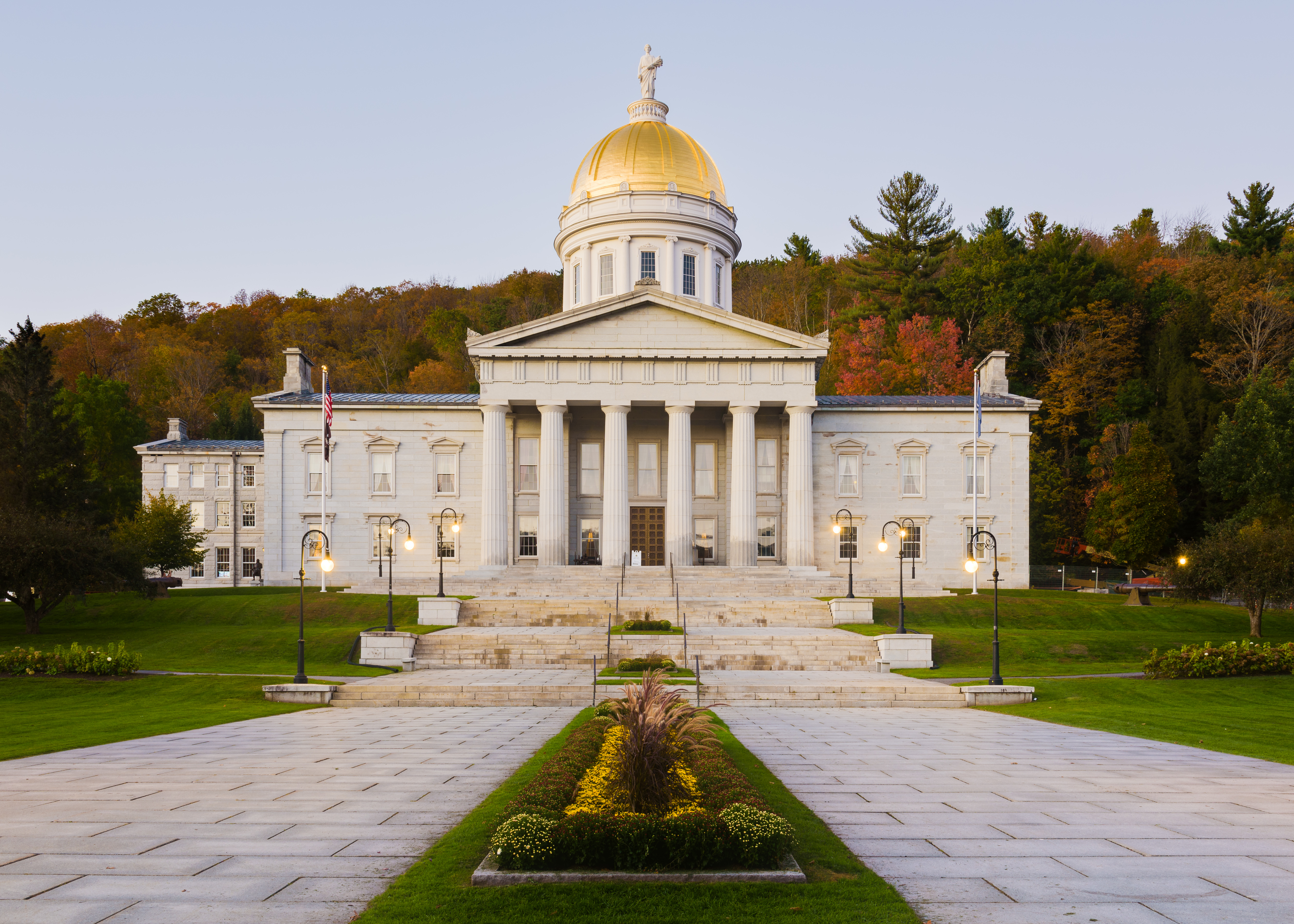
The gold leaf dome of the neoclassical Vermont State House (Capitol) in Montpelier

On January 15, 1777, representatives of the New Hampshire Grants declared the independence of the Vermont Republic. For the first six months of its existence, it was called the Republic of New Connecticut.

On June 2, 1777, a second convention of 72 delegates met and adopted the name "Vermont". This was on the advice of Thomas Young, a mentor of Ethan Allen. He advised them on how to achieve admission into the newly independent United States of America as the 14th state. On July 4, they completed the drafting of the first Constitution of Vermont (in effect from 1777 to 1786) at the Windsor Tavern, and adopted it on July 8. This was the first written constitution in North America to ban adult slavery, stating that male slaves become free at the age of 21 and females at 18. It provided for universal adult male suffrage and established a public school system.

=== Revolutionary War ===
The Battle of Bennington was fought on August 16, 1777. A combined American force under General John Stark, attacked the Hessian column at Hoosick, New York, just across the border from Bennington. It killed or captured virtually the entire Hessian detachment. General John Burgoyne never recovered from this loss and eventually surrendered the remainder of the 6,000-man force at Saratoga, New York, on October 17 of that year.

The battles of Bennington and Saratoga together are recognized as the turning point in the Revolutionary War, because they were the first major defeat of a British army. The anniversary of the battle is celebrated in Vermont as a legal holiday.

The Battle of Hubbardton (July 7, 1777) was the only Revolutionary battle within the present boundaries of Vermont. Although the Continental forces suffered defeat, the British forces were damaged to the point that they did not pursue the Americans (retreating from Fort Ticonderoga) any further.

=== Admission to the Union ===
1791 Act of Congress admitting Vermont into the Union

Vermont continued to govern itself as a sovereign entity based in the eastern town of Windsor for 14 years. The independent state of Vermont issued its own coinage from 1785 to 1788 and operated a national postal service. Thomas Chittenden was the Governor in 1778–1789 and in 1790–1791.

Because the state of New York continued to assert that Vermont was a part of New York, Vermont could not be admitted to the Union under Article IV, Section 3 of the Constitution until the legislature of New York consented. On March 6, 1790, the legislature made its consent contingent upon a negotiated agreement on the precise boundary between the two states. When commissioners from New York and Vermont met to decide on the boundary, Vermont's negotiators insisted on also settling the property ownership disputes with New Yorkers, rather than leaving that decision to a federal court. The negotiations were successfully concluded in October 1790 with an agreement that Vermont would pay $30,000 to New York to be distributed among New Yorkers who claimed land in Vermont under New York land patents. In January 1791, a convention in Vermont voted 105–4 to petition Congress to become a state in the federal union. Congress acted on February 18, 1791, to admit Vermont to the Union as the 14th state as of March 4, 1791; two weeks earlier on February 4, 1791, Congress had decided to admit Kentucky as the 15th state as of June 1, 1792. Vermont became the first state to enter the Union after the original 13 states. The revised constitution of 1786, which established a greater separation of powers, continued in effect until 1793, two years after Vermont's admission to the Union.

Under the Act "To Secure Freedom to All Persons Within This State," slavery was officially outlawed by state law on November 25, 1858, less than three years before the American Civil War. Vermonters provided refuge at several sites for escaped slaves fleeing to Canada, as part of the Underground Railroad.

=== Civil War ===
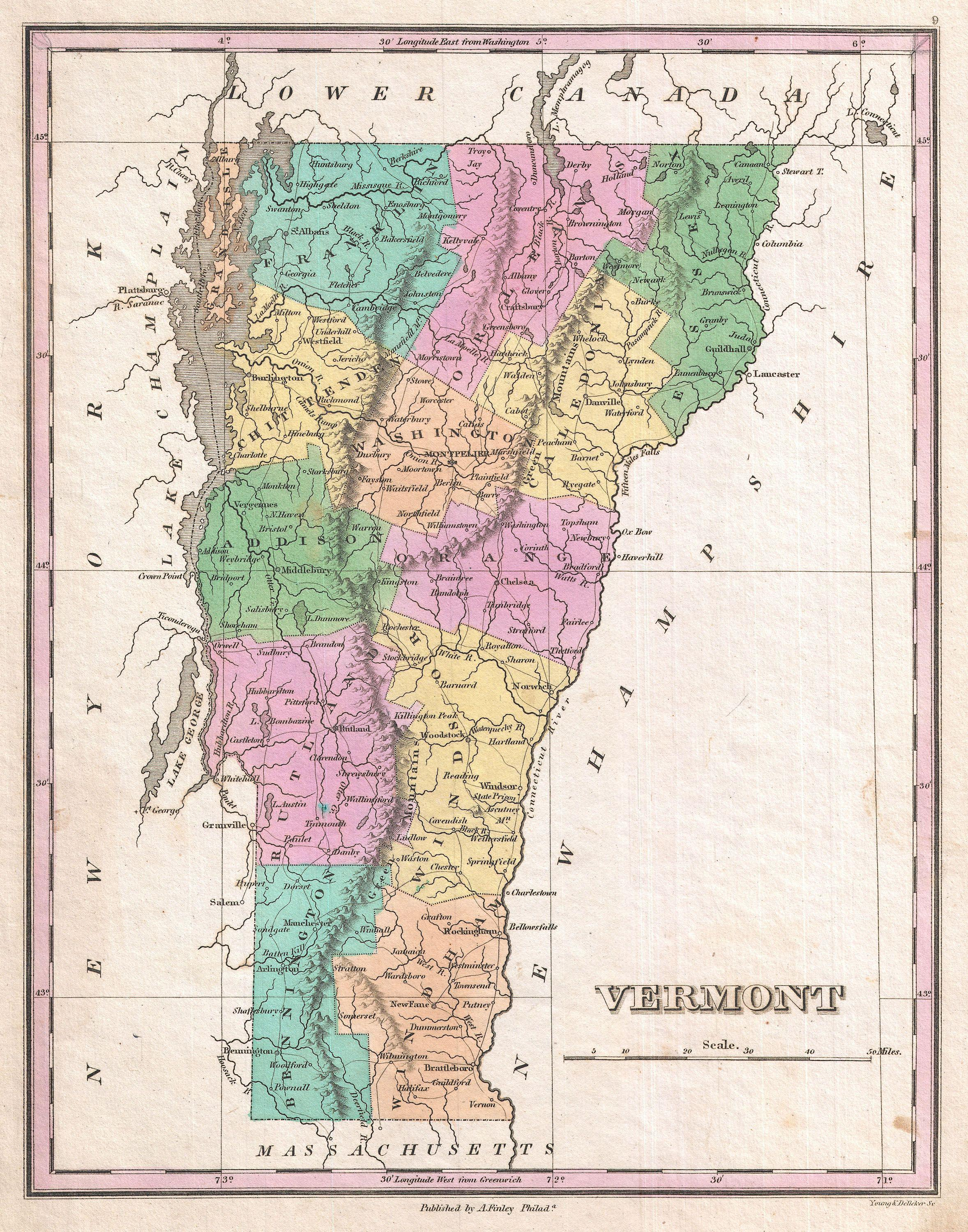
Vermont in 1827. The county boundaries have since changed.

From the mid-1850s on, some Vermonters became abolitionists, which they had previously worked to contain in the South. Abolitionist Thaddeus Stevens was born in Vermont and later represented a district in Pennsylvania in Congress. He developed as a national leader and later promoted Radical Republican goals after the American Civil War. As the Whig Party declined and the Republican Party grew, Vermont supported Republican candidates. In 1860, it voted for Abraham Lincoln, giving him the largest margin of victory of any state.

During the American Civil War, Vermont sent 33,288 troops into United States service, of which 5,224 (more than 15 percent) died.

The northernmost land action of the war was the St. Albans Raid—the robbery of three St. Albans banks, perpetrated in October 1864 by Confederate agents. A posse pursued the Confederate raiders into Canada and captured several, before having to turn them over to Canadian officials. Canada reimbursed the banks, released, and later re-arrested some of the perpetrators.

=== Post–Civil War to the present ===
==== Demographic changes ====
Beginning in the mid-19th century, Vermont industries attracted numerous Irish, Scottish, and Italian immigrants, adding to its residents of mostly English and some French Canadian ancestry. Many of the immigrants migrated to Barre, where many worked as stonecutters of granite, for which there was a national market. Vermont granite was used in major public buildings throughout the United States.

In this period, many Italian and Scottish women operated boarding houses to support their families. Such facilities helped absorb new residents and taught them the new culture; European immigrants peaked in number between 1890 and 1900. Typically immigrants boarded with people of their own language and ethnicity, but sometimes they boarded with others.

Gradually, the new immigrants assimilated into the state. Times of tension aroused divisions. In the early 20th century, some Vermonters were alarmed about the decline of rural areas; people left farming to move to cities and others seemed unable to fit within society. In addition, there was a wave of immigration by French Canadians, and Protestant Anglo-Americans feared being overtaken by the new immigrants, who added to the Catholic population of Irish and Italians. Based on the colonial past, some Yankee residents considered the French Canadians to have intermarried too frequently with Native Americans.

In 1970, the population of Vermont stood at 444,732. By 1980, it had increased by over 65,000 to 511,456. That change, an increase of 15 percent, was the largest increase in Vermont's population since the days of the Revolutionary War.

In 2002, the State of Vermont incorrectly reported that the Abenaki people had migrated north to Quebec by the end of the 17th century; however, in 2011, the State of Vermont designated the Elnu Abenaki Tribe and the Nulhegan Band of the Coosuk Abenaki Nation as state-recognized tribes; in 2012 it recognized the Abenaki Nation of Missisquoi and the Koasek Traditional Band of the Koos Abenaki Nation. In 2016, the state governor proclaimed Columbus Day as Indigenous Peoples Day. Vermont has no federally recognized tribes.

==== Political changes ====
Vermont approved women's suffrage decades before it became part of the national constitution. Women were first allowed to vote in the elections of December 18, 1880, when they were granted limited suffrage. They were first allowed to vote in town elections, and later in state legislative races.

In 1931, Vermont was the 29th state to pass a eugenics law. Vermont, like other states, sterilized some patients in institutions and persons it had identified through surveys as degenerate or unfit. It nominally had permission from the patients or their guardians, but abuses were documented. Two-thirds of the sterilizations were done on women, and poor, unwed mothers were targeted, among others. There is disagreement about how many sterilizations were performed; most were completed between 1931 and 1941, but such procedures were recorded as late as 1970.

In 1964, the U.S. Supreme Court decision in Reynolds v. Sims required "one man, one vote" redistricting in all states. It had found that many state legislatures had not redistricted and were dominated by rural interests, years after the development of densely populated and industrial urban areas. In addition, it found that many states had an upper house based on geographical jurisdictions, such as counties. This gave disproportionate power to rural and lightly populated counties. The court ruled there was no basis for such a structure. Major changes in political apportionment took place in Vermont and other affected states.

In the 21st century, Vermont increasingly became defined by its progressivism. It was the first state to introduce civil unions in 2000 and the first state to legalize same-sex marriage in 2009, unforced by court challenge or ruling. On January 22, 2018, Vermont became the first state to legalize cannabis for recreational use by legislative action, and the ninth state in the United States to legalize marijuana for medical purposes. This law was signed by Republican Governor Phil Scott.

== Geography ==
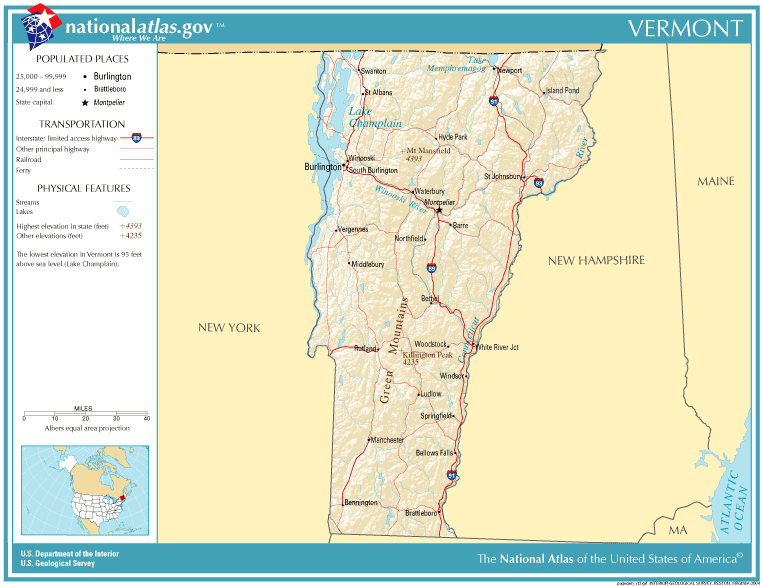
Map of Vermont showing cities, roads, and rivers

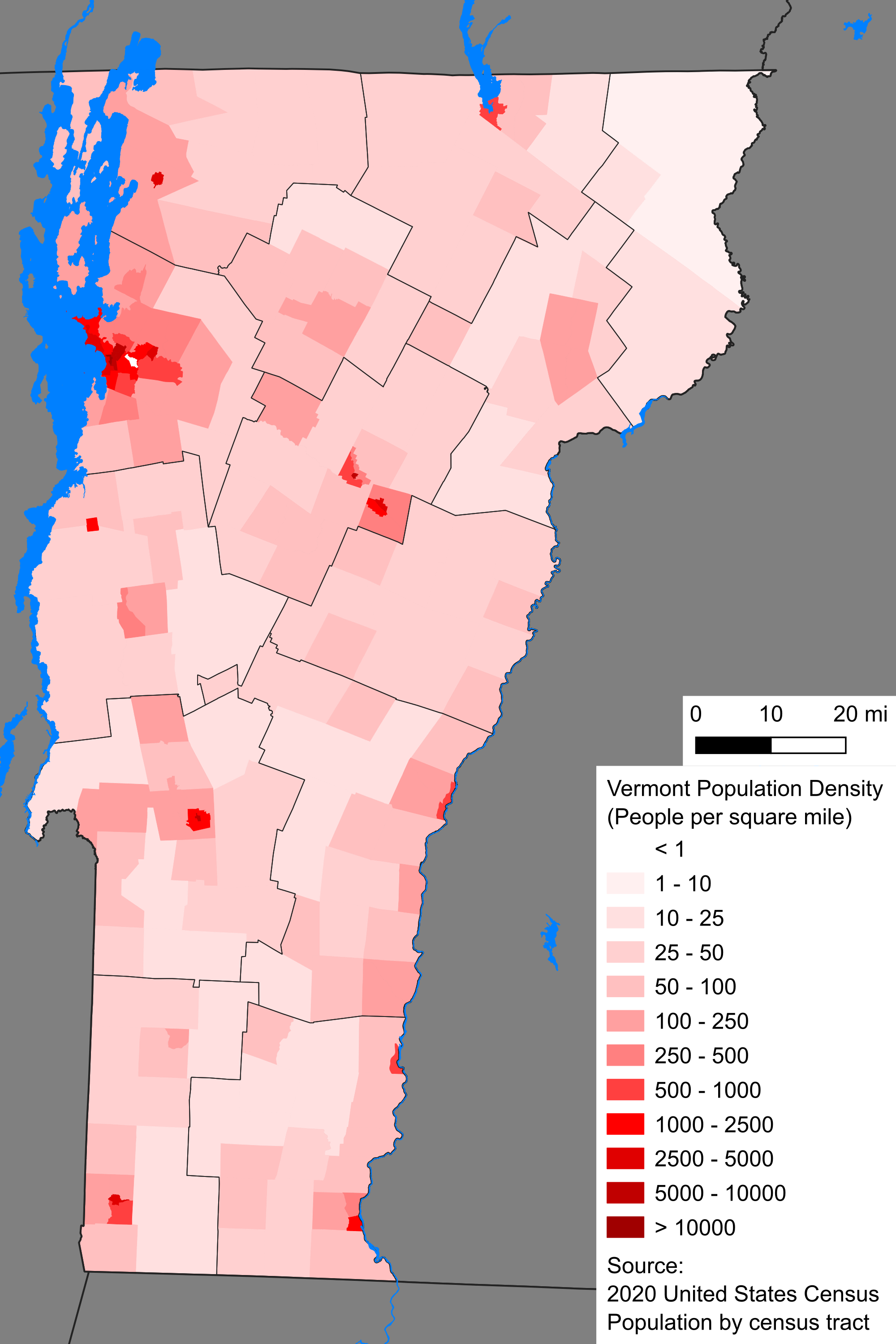
Population density of Vermont

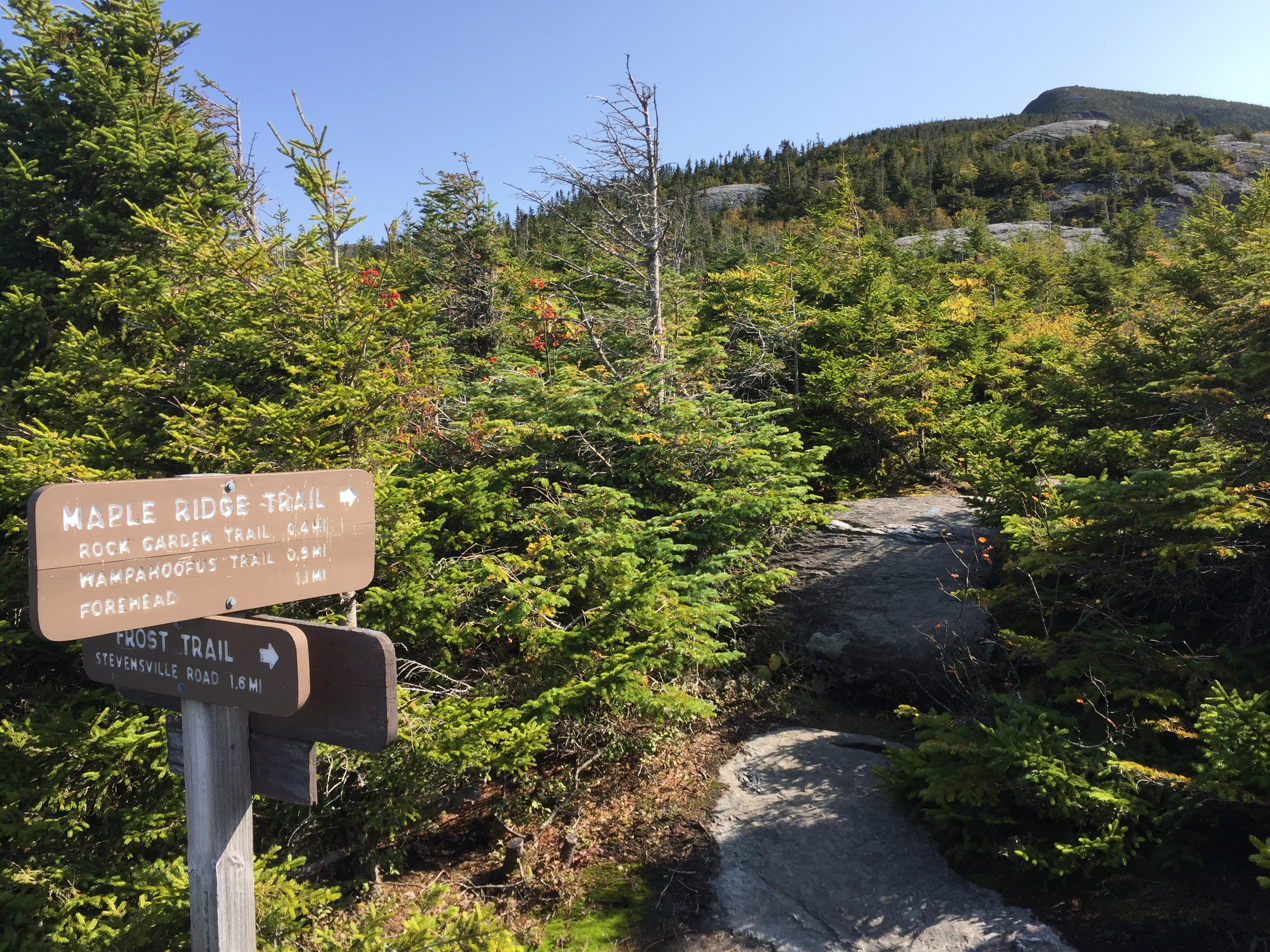
Mount Mansfield

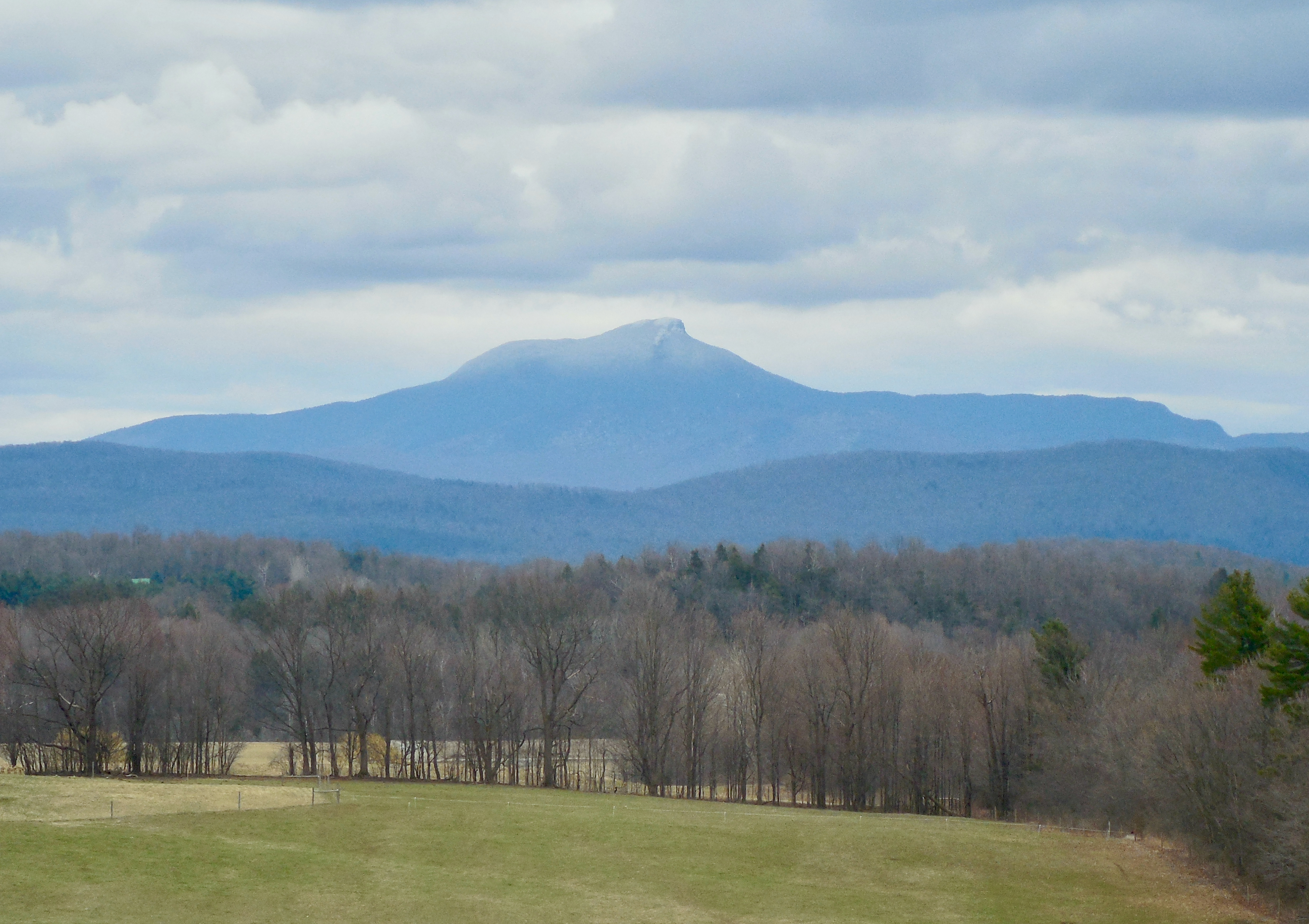
Western face of Camel's Hump Mountain (elevation 4,079 feet; 1,243 m)

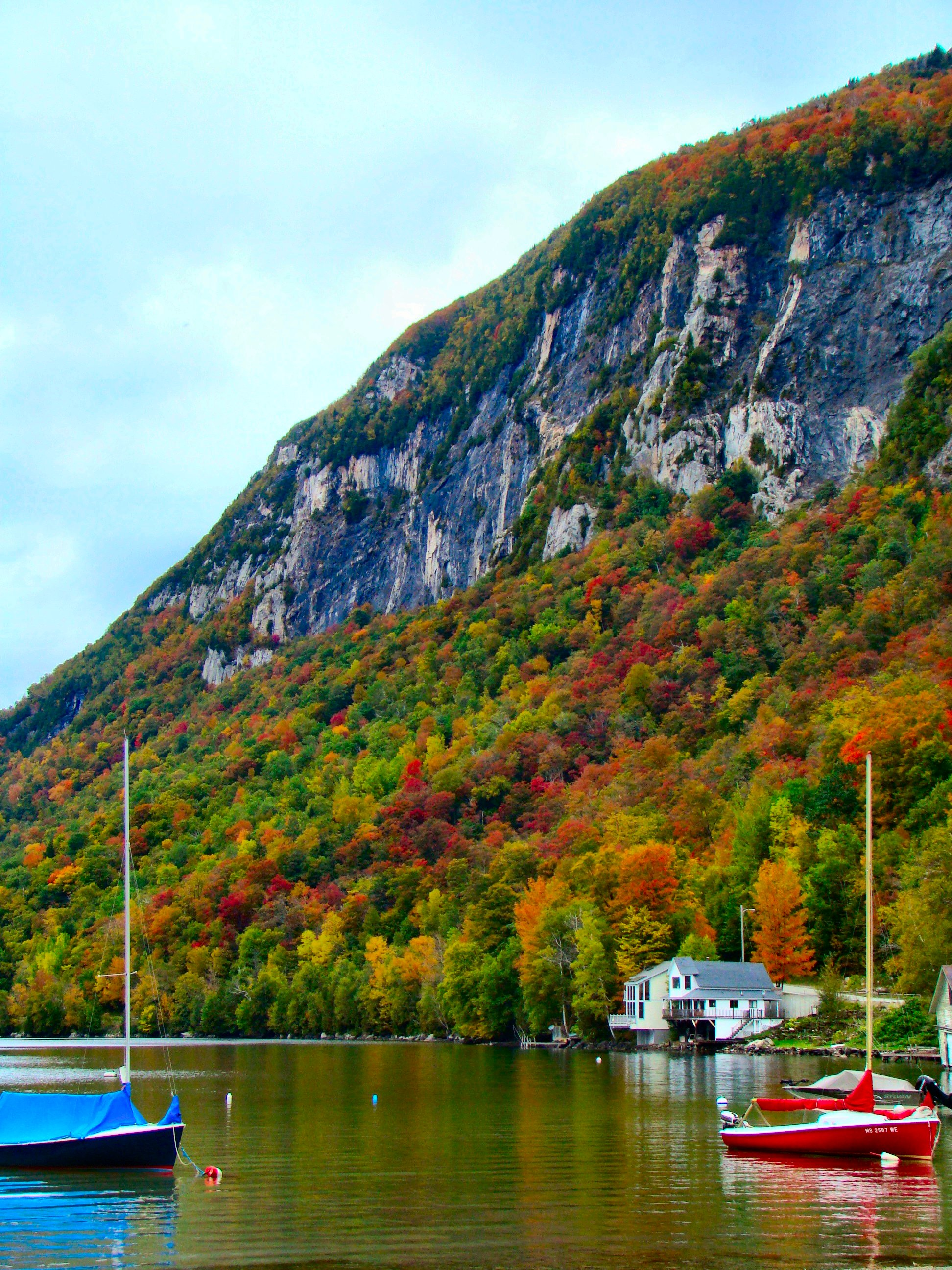
Fall foliage at Lake Willoughby

Vermont is located in the New England region of the northeastern United States and comprises 9,614 square miles (24,900 km^{2}), making it the 45th-largest state. It is the only state that does not have any buildings taller than 124 feet (38 m). Land comprises 9,250 square miles (24,000 km^{2}) and water comprises 365 square miles (950 km^{2}), making it the 43rd-largest in land area and the 47th in water area. In total area, it is larger than El Salvador and smaller than Haiti. It is the only landlocked state in New England, and it is the easternmost and smallest in area of all US landlocked states.

The Green Mountains in Vermont form a north–south spine running most of the length of the state, slightly west of its center. In the southwest portion of the state are located the Taconic Mountains. In the northwest, near Lake Champlain, is the fertile Champlain Valley. In the south of the valley is Lake Bomoseen.

The west bank of the Connecticut River marks the state's eastern border with New Hampshire, though much of the river flows within New Hampshire. 41% of Vermont's land area is part of the Connecticut River's watershed.

Lake Champlain, the sixth-largest body of fresh water in the United States, separates Vermont from New York in the northwest portion of the state.

From north to south, Vermont is 159 miles (256 km) long. Its greatest width, from east to west, is 89 miles (143 km) at the Canada–U.S. border; the narrowest width is 37 miles (60 km) near the Massachusetts border. The width averages 60.5 miles (97.4 km). The state's geographic center is approximately three miles (4.8 km) east of Roxbury, in Washington County. There are fifteen U.S. federal border crossings between Vermont and Canada.

Several mountains have timberlines with delicate year-round alpine ecosystems, including Mount Mansfield, the highest mountain in the state; Killington Peak, the second-highest; Camel's Hump, the state's third-highest; and Mount Abraham, the fifth-highest peak. Areas in Vermont administered by the National Park Service include the Marsh-Billings-Rockefeller National Historical Park (in Woodstock) and the Appalachian National Scenic Trail.

The topography and climate make sections of Vermont subject to large-scale flooding. Incidents include the Great Vermont Flood of 1927, which killed 84 and damaged much of the state's infrastructure, the flood of 1973, which covered many of the state's roads in the southeast, and Tropical Storm Irene in 2011, which caused substantial damage throughout the state. In response to the 1927 flood, the federal government funded construction of six flood control dams in the state, run by the Army Corps of Engineers. These extreme rain and flooding events are expected to intensify with climate change.

=== Cities ===
Vermont has ten incorporated cities. The most populous city in Vermont is Burlington. Its metropolitan area is also the most populous in the state, with an estimate of 225,562 as of 2020.

City populations (2020 census)
City	Population
Burlington	44,743
South Burlington	20,292
Rutland	15,807
Essex Junction	10,761
Barre	8,491
Montpelier	8,074
Winooski	7,997
St. Albans	6,877
Newport	4,455
Vergennes	2,553

=== Largest towns ===
Although these towns are large enough to be considered cities, they are not incorporated as such.

Large town populations (2020 census)
Town	Population
Essex	22,094
Colchester	17,524
Bennington	15,333
Brattleboro	12,184
Milton	10,723
Hartford	10,686
Williston	10,103
Middlebury	9,152
Springfield	9,062
Barre	7,923
Shelburne	7,717
St. Johnsbury	7,364

=== Climate ===
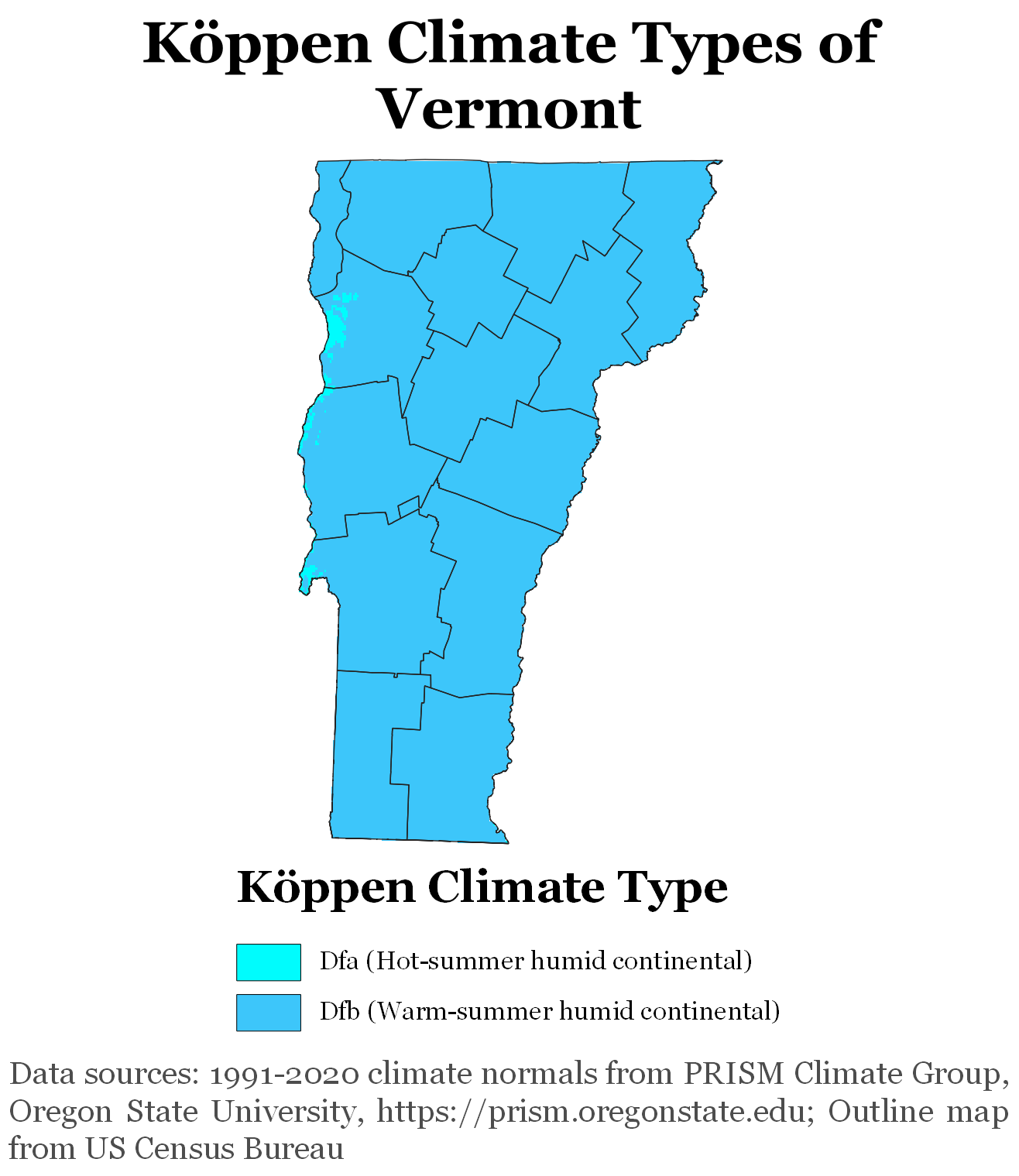
Köppen climate types of Vermont, using 1991–2020 climate normals

The annual mean temperature for the state is 43 °F (6 °C). Vermont has a humid continental climate, with muddy springs, in general a mild early summer, hot Augusts; it has colorful autumns: Vermont's hills reveal red, orange, and (on sugar maples) gold foliage as cold weather approaches. Winters are colder at higher elevations. It has a Köppen climate classification of Dfb, a temperate continental climate.

The rural northeastern section known as the "Northeast Kingdom" often averages 10 °F (5.6 °C) colder than the southern areas of the state during winter. The annual snowfall averages between 60 and 100 inches (1,500 and 2,500 mm) depending on elevation. Vermont is the seventh coldest state in the country.

The highest recorded temperature was 105 °F (41 °C), at Vernon, on July 4, 1911. The lowest recorded temperature was −50 °F (−46 °C), at Bloomfield, on December 30, 1933; this is the lowest temperature recorded in New England alongside Big Black River, which recorded a verified −50 °F (−46 °C) in 2009. The agricultural growing season ranges from 120 to 180 days.

The United States Department of Agriculture plant hardiness zones for the state range between zone 3b, no colder than −35 °F (−37 °C), in the Northeast Kingdom and northern part of the state and zone 5b, no colder than −15 °F (−26 °C), in the southern part of the state.

The state receives between 2,200 and 2,400 hours of sunshine annually. New England as a whole receives a range of less than 2,000 hours of sunshine in part of New Hampshire to as much as 2,600 hours of sunshine per year in Connecticut and Rhode Island.

==== Climate change ====
Climate change in Vermont encompasses the effects of climate change, attributed to anthropogenic increases in atmospheric carbon dioxide.

The state is already seeing effects of climate change that affect its ecosystems, economy and public health. According to the state government, rainfall has significantly increased in the last 50 years, storms and flooding have increased, and winters have become warmer and shorter. These changes have affected the winter tourism industry, and caused a decline in critical agricultural and woodland industries like maple sugaring.

The state openly acknowledges and is developing programs that respond to global warming. Vermont was one of the first states in the United States to adopt greenhouse gas emissions goals, in 2006.

=== Geology ===
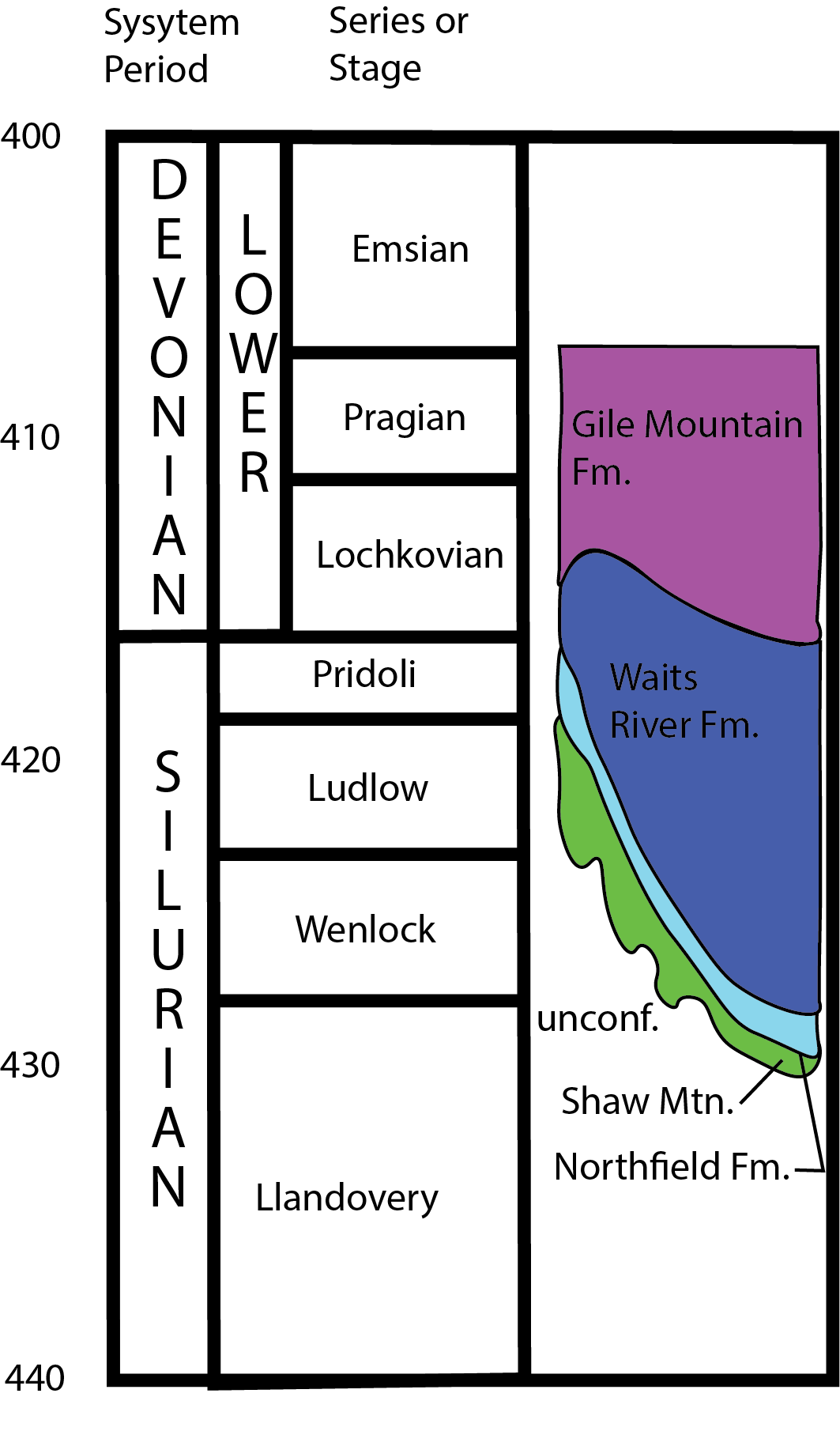
Silurian and Devonian stratigraphy of Vermont

There are five distinct physiographic regions of Vermont. Categorized by geological and physical attributes, they are the Northeastern Highlands, the Green Mountains, the Taconic Mountains, the Champlain Lowlands, and the Vermont Piedmont.

About 500 million years ago, Vermont was part of Laurentia and located in the tropics. The central and southern Green Mountain range include the oldest rocks in Vermont, formed about one billion years ago during the first mountain building period (or orogeny). Subsequently, about 400 million years ago, the second mountain building period created Green Mountain peaks that were 15,000–20,000 feet (4,600–6,100 m) tall, three to four times their current height and comparable to the Himalayas. The geological pressures that created those peaks remain evident as the Champlain Thrust, running north–south to the west of the mountains (now the eastern shore of Lake Champlain). It is an example of geological fault thrusting where bedrock is pushed over the newer rock formation.

As a result of tectonic formation, Vermont east of the Green Mountains tends to be formed from rocks produced in the Silurian and Devonian periods, and western Vermont mainly from the older Pre-Cambrian and Cambrian material. Several large deposits within the state contain granite. The remains of the Chazy Formation can be observed in Isle La Motte which was one of the first tropical reefs. It is the site of the limestone Fisk Quarry, which contains a collection of ancient marine fossils, such as stromatoporoids, that date to 200 million years ago. At one point, Vermont is believed to have been connected to Africa (Pangaea); the fossils found and the rock formations found on the coasts in both Africa and America are evidence affirming the Pangaea theory.

In the past four centuries, Vermont has experienced a few earthquakes, rarely centered under the state. The highest ranked, in 1952, had a Richter magnitude scale 6.0 and was based in Canada.

=== Fauna ===
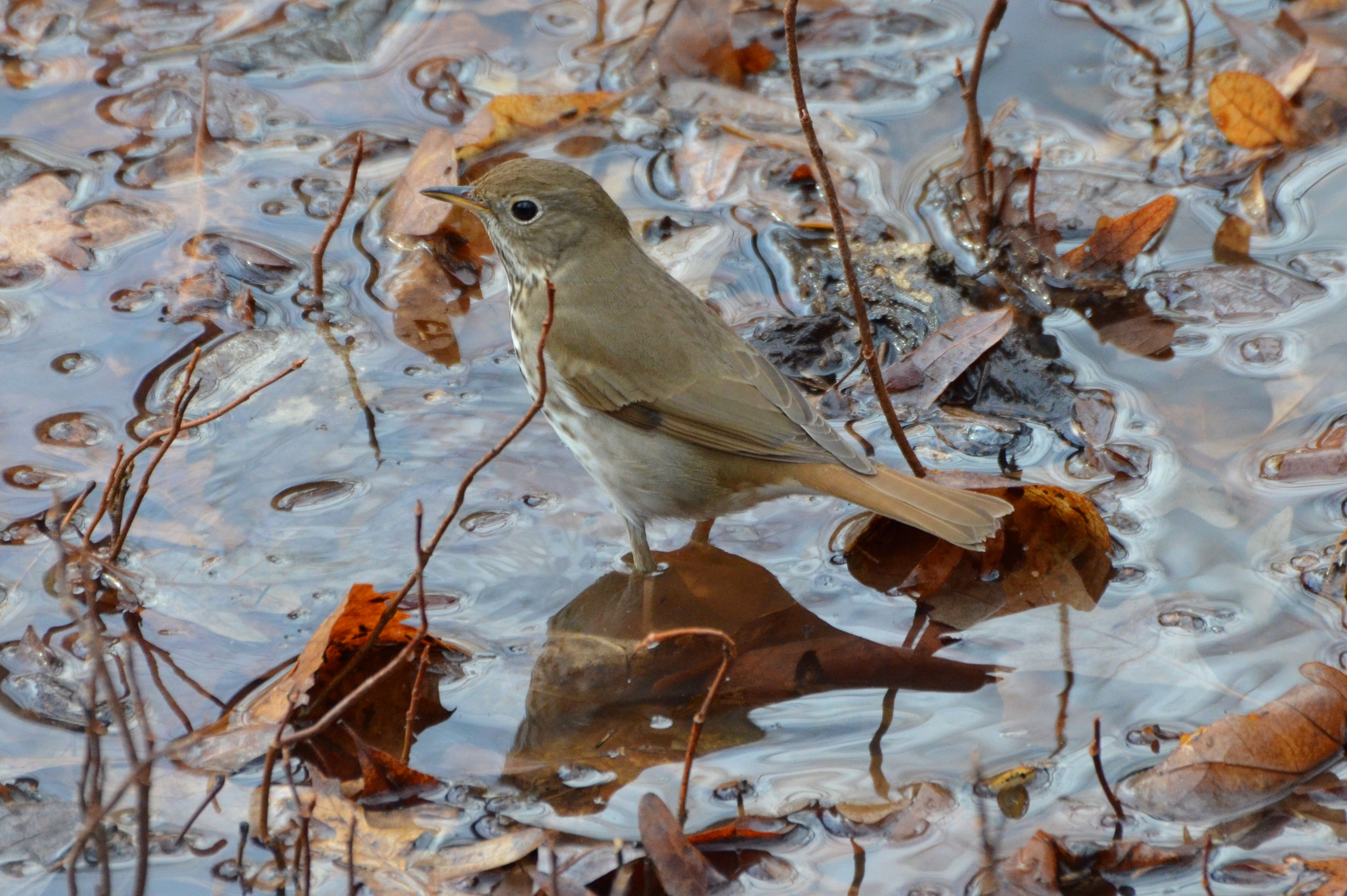
The hermit thrush, the state bird of Vermont

The state contains 41 species of reptiles and amphibians (including the spring peeper), 89 species of fish, of which 12 are nonnative; 193 species of breeding birds, 58 species of mammals (including black bears, eastern chipmunks, coyotes, fishers, red and gray foxes, porcupines, and woodchucks), more than 15,000 insect species (including luna moths), and 2,000 higher plant species, plus fungi, algae, and 75 different types of natural communities. Vermont contains one species of venomous snake, the timber rattlesnake, which is confined to a few acres in western Rutland County.

Wildlife has suffered because of human development in the state. By the mid-19th century, wild turkeys were eradicated in the state through hunting and habitat destruction. Sixteen were reintroduced in 1969, and had grown to a flock estimated to number 45,000 in 2009. In 2013, hunters killed 6,968 of these. Since 1970, reduction of farmland has resulted in reduced environment for, and resulted in a decline in, numbers of various shrubland birds, including the American woodcock, brown thrasher, eastern towhee, willow flycatcher, golden-winged warbler, blue-winged warbler, field sparrow, and Baltimore oriole. Ospreys, whose eggs were previously damaged by DDT, began to reappear in 1998 and by 2010, were no longer endangered in the state.

Several species have declined or disappeared from the state, including bats, many of which have been killed by white-nose syndrome, the New England cottontail, outcompeted by the eastern cottontail rabbit, and the yellow-banded bumblebee, gone as one of 19 species of bee in decline.

Invasive species and organisms include the Asian spotted wing drosophila, a destroyer of crops, and eastern equine encephalitis virus whose antibodies were found in moose or deer in each of Vermont's counties.

=== Flora ===
Vermont is in the temperate broadleaf and mixed forests biome. Much of the state, in particular the Green Mountains, is covered by the conifers and northern hardwoods of the New England-Acadian forests. The western border with New York and the area around Lake Champlain lies within the Eastern Great Lakes lowland forests. The southwest corner of the state and parts of the Connecticut River are covered by northeastern coastal forests of mixed oak.

Invasive wild honeysuckle has been deemed a threat to the state's forests, native species of plants, and wildlife. Many of Vermont's rivers, including the Winooski River, have been subjected to artificial barriers to prevent flooding.

Historical population
Census	Pop.	Note	%±
1790	85,425		—
1800	154,465		80.8%
1810	217,895		41.1%
1820	235,981		8.3%
1830	280,652		18.9%
1840	291,948		4.0%
1850	314,120		7.6%
1860	315,098		0.3%
1870	330,551		4.9%
1880	332,286		0.5%
1890	332,422		0.0%
1900	343,641		3.4%
1910	355,956		3.6%
1920	352,428		−1.0%
1930	359,611		2.0%
1940	359,231		−0.1%
1950	377,747		5.2%
1960	389,881		3.2%
1970	444,330		14.0%
1980	511,456		15.1%
1990	562,758		10.0%
2000	608,827		8.2%
2010	625,741		2.8%
2020	643,085		2.8%
2025 (est.)	644,663		0.2%
Source: 1910–2020

Climate change appears to be affecting the maple sugar industry. Sugar maples have been subject to stress by acid rain, asian long-horned beetles, and pear thrips. In 2011, the deer herd had grown too large for the habitat, and many resorted to eating bark to survive the winter, destroying trees in the process. In addition, the sugar maples need a certain period of cold to produce sap for maple syrup. The time to tap these trees has shrunk to one week in recent years. The tree may be replaced by the more aggressive Norway maples, in effect forcing the sugar maples to "migrate" north to Canada.

== Demographics ==
=== Population ===
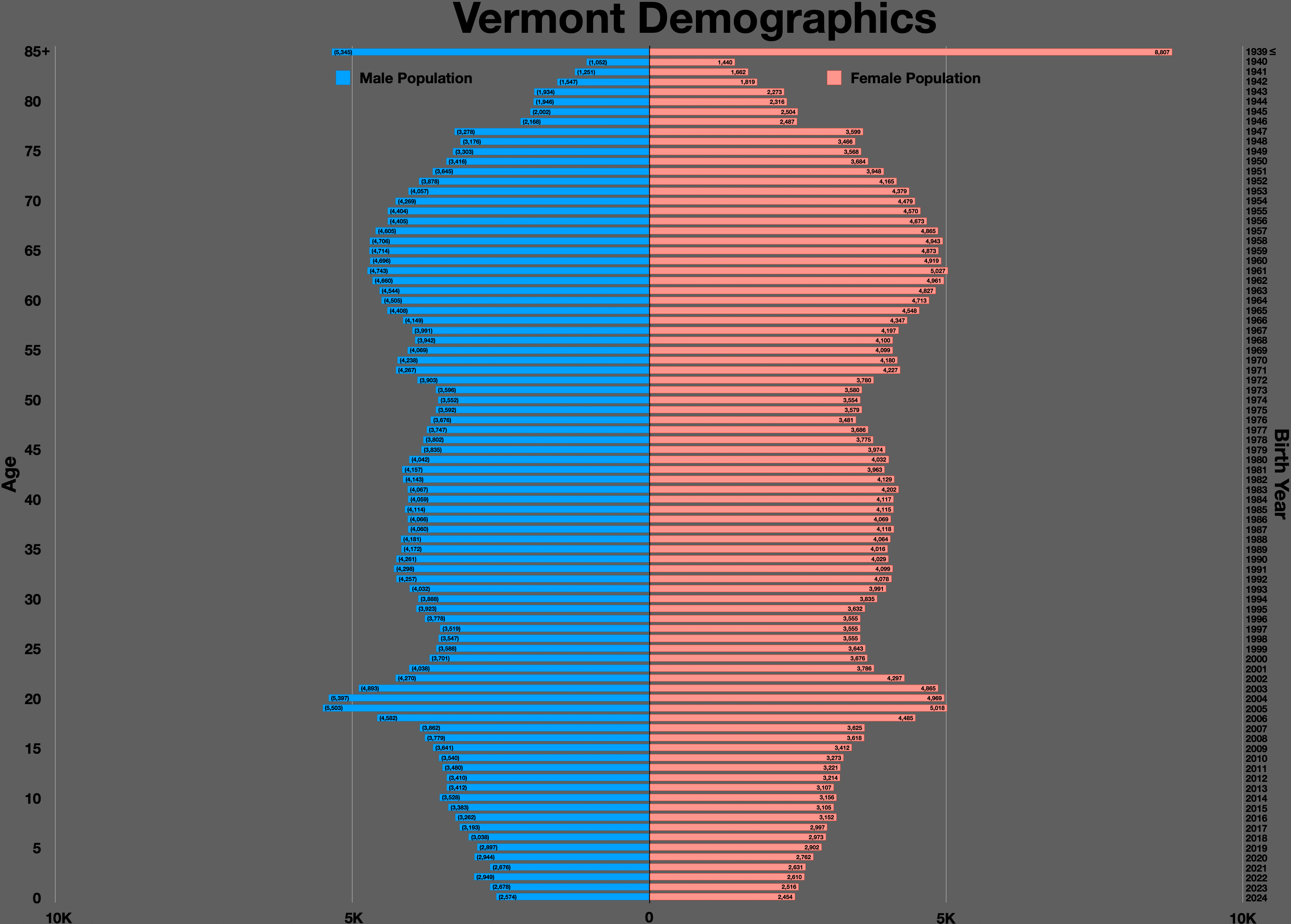
Vermont population pyramid

According to the U.S. Census Bureau, the state of Vermont had a population of 643,085 in the 2020 U.S. census. Vermont was one of two states with fewer people than the District of Columbia; Wyoming was the other. The center of population of Vermont is located in Washington County, in the town of Warren.

The influx of domestic migrants in the 1960s to 1980s brought outlooks different from those of the native-born population. As one example, since 1988, Vermont has consistently voted for Democrats in national elections, despite having been the most Republican state in the nation for more than 100 years after the party's founding in the 1850s.

Inward migration to Vermont began to wane during the 2000s, and became emigration during the 2010s. This trend reversed in the 2020s, with about 4,500 new residents domestically migrating to the state between 2020 and 2021. Chittenden County has seen the most rapid population growth, experiencing a 7.5% increase between 2010 and 2020. In 2018, the top countries of origin for immigrants in Vermont were Canada, Nepal, Jamaica, the Philippines and Bosnia and Herzegovina.

==== Race and ethnicity ====
As of 2022, 94% of Vermont's residents identify as racially White, and 92.2% of all residents are White people without Hispanic origin, making it one of the least diverse states in the U.S., along with Maine. When including French Canadians, the French made up the largest ancestral and ethnic group, with 20% of Vermont's population identify as such, with Irish and English also making up large portions of the populace.

Race and ethnicity in Vermont (2021)
1. White (non-Hispanic) (92.2%)
2. Hispanic or Latino (2.20%)
3. Asian (non-Hispanic) (2.00%)
4. Mixed race (1.90%)
5. Black (non-Hispanic) (1.30%)
6. American Indian (non-Hispanic) (0.30%)

The population of Vermont by race: 2000–2021
Race	2000	2005	2010	2015	2021
White (non-Hispanic)	587,155 (96.3%)	591,941 (95.3%)	590,817 (94.4%)	584,157 (93.3%)	595,151 (92.2%)
Hispanic or Latino	5,556 (0.9%)	7,754 (1.2%)	9,291 (1.5%)	11,214 (1.8%)	14,384 (2.2%)
Asian (non-Hispanic)	5,521 (0.9%)	6,885 (1.1%)	8,004 (1.3%)	10,477 (1.7%)	12,765 (2.0%)
Mixed race	5,972 (1%)	7,686 (1.2%)	9,543 (1.5%)	10,567 (1.7%)	12,316 (1.9%)
Black (non-Hispanic)	3,040 (0.5%)	4,590 (0.7%)	6,056 (1%)	7,230 (1.2%)	8,685 (1.3%)
American Indian (non-Hispanic)	2,374 (0.4%)	2,215 (0.4%)	2,030 (0.3%)	1,993 (0.3%)	2,082 (0.3%)
Total	609,618	621,215	625,886	625,810	645,570

==== Vital statistics ====
A total of 5,384 babies were born in 2021, a 4.89% increase from 2020. Of those births, 90.3% were non-Hispanic white. The fertility rate was 1.371, a slight increase from 2020.

Live births by race/ethnicity of mother, and birth rate: 2017-2024 (Note: Births in table do not total 100% because Hispanics are counted by both ethnicity and race, giving a higher overall number.)
Race (Note: Since 2016, data for births of White Hispanic origin are not collected, but included in one Hispanic group; persons of Hispanic origin may be of any race.)	2017	2018	2019	2020	2021	2022	2023	2024
White	5,134 (90.8%)	4,934 (90.8%)	4,856 (90.6%)	4,646 (90.5%)	4,863 (90.3%)	4,754 (89.4%)	4,526 (89.3%)	4,460 (88.8%)
Black	115 (2.0%)	118 (2.2%)	133 (2.5%)	108 (2.1%)	137 (2.5%)	116 (2.2%)	123 (2.4%)	140 (2.7%)
Asian	159 (2.8%)	152 (2.8%)	122 (2.3%)	137 (2.7%)	122 (2.3%)	145 (2.7%)	143 (2.8%)	108 (2.1%)
American Indian	16 (0.3%)	12 (0.2%)	11 (0.2%)	15 (0.3%)	13 (0.2%)	13 (0.2%)	12 (0.2%)	10 (0.2%)
Hispanic (any race)	123 (2.2%)	121 (2.2%)	124 (2.3%)	132 (2.6%)	147 (2.7%)	163 (3.1%)	152 (3.0%)	203 (4.0%)
Total births	5,655 (100%)	5,432 (100%)	5,361 (100%)	5,133 (100%)	5,384 (100%)	5,316 (100%)	5,065 (100%)	5,023 (100%)
Total Fertility rate	1.542	1.519	1.443	1.432	1.359	1.371	1.352	1.273
Birth rate	9.2	9.1	8.7	8.6	8.2	8.3	8.2	7.7

=== Dialect ===
Linguists have identified speech patterns found among Vermonters as belonging to Western New England English, a dialect of New England English, which features full pronunciation of all r sounds, pronouncing horse and hoarse the same, and pronouncing vowels in father and bother the same, none of which are features traditionally shared in neighboring Eastern New England English. Some rural speakers realize the t as a glottal stop (mitten sounds like "mi'in" and Vermont like "Vermon' " (Note: Often pronounced [vəɹˈmɑ̃ʔ] in rural areas of the state)). A dwindling segment of the Vermont population, generally both rural and male, pronounces certain vowels in a distinctive manner (e.g. cows with a raised vowel as [kʰɛʊz] and ride with a backed, somewhat rounded vowel as [ɹɒɪd]).

Eastern New England English—also found in New Hampshire, Maine and eastern Massachusetts—was common in eastern Vermont in the mid-twentieth century and before, but has become rare. This accent drops the r sound in words ending in r (farmer sounds like "farm-uh") and adds an r sound to some words ending in a vowel (idea sounds like "idee-er") was common. Those characteristics in eastern Vermont appear to have been inherited from West Country and Scots-Irish ancestors.

Vermont is one of three states (along with Maine and New Hampshire) where French is the second-most spoken language at home, which is largely due to the state's proximity to the province of Quebec. New England French, a unique dialect spoken in many of Vermont's Francophone homes, is derived from Quebec French, in contrast to the Brayon French which predominates in the Francophone regions of northern Maine which were settled primarily by Acadians.

=== Religion ===
Religion, per Public Religion Research Institute's 2022 American Values Survey (Note: Note: there is a glitch surrounding the display of Vermont's religious tradition data on Public Religion Research Institute. Click the "list" option if results show "N/A". Do not remove pie chart.)
1. Unaffiliated (48.0%)
2. Catholicism (21.0%)
3. Protestantism (19.0%)
4. Jehovah's Witness (4.00%)
5. Unitarian/Universalist (2.00%)
6. Mormonism (1.00%)
7. Hinduism (4.00%)
8. Jewish (1.00%)

According to the Pew Research Center in 2014, 37% reported no religion, the highest rate of irreligion of all U.S. states. The Pew Research Center also determined the largest religion was Christianity; Catholics made up 22% of the population and Protestants were 30%. In contrast with Southern U.S. trends, the majority of Protestants are mainline Protestant, dominated by Methodism. The United Methodist Church was the largest mainline Protestant denomination in Vermont, followed by the American Baptist Churches USA and United Church of Christ. Evangelical Protestants were dominated by independent Baptist churches. Major non-Christian religions were Judaism, Islam, Buddhism, Hinduism, and other faiths. The largest non-Christian religious group outside of irreligion were Unitarians. An estimated 3.1% of the irreligious were atheist.

With the publication of a study by the Public Religion Research Institute in 2020, Christianity spread among Protestantism, Catholicism, and non-mainstream Christians including Mormonism and the Jehovah's Witnesses were approximately 64% of the adult population. The religiously unaffiliated were determined to be an estimated 30% of the total adult population according to the Public Religion Research Institute. As of 2022 per the Public Religion Research Institute, Vermont became plurality irreligious, and consistently ranks as one of the most secular states in the United States. The 2022 study estimated 48% of the population were religiously unaffiliated, while 45% were Christian altogether (Catholic, Protestant, Mormon, and Jehovah's Witness).

The Association of Religion Data Archives reported that in 2020, the religiously affiliated population were primarily Christian. The single largest Christian denominations were the following: the Catholic Church (124,208); United Church of Christ (11,882); and the United Methodist Church (9,652). Non-denominational Protestants numbered 29,830. Among the largest Christian denominations at this study, Catholics had an adherence rate of 208.70 per 1,000 people; the United Church of Christ 18.48 per 1,000 people; and United Methodists 15.01 per 1,000 people. ARDA's 2020 membership tabulations reflected the Pew Research Center's 2014 study where 21% of the population attended religious services weekly, 32% once or twice a month, and 47% seldom/never. In a 2018 research article by the National Christian Foundation, non-churchgoing Christians nationwide did not attend religious services often through practicing the faith in other ways, not finding a house of worship they liked, disliking sermons and feeling unwelcomed, and logistics.

== Economy ==
According to the U.S. Bureau of Economic Analysis, in 2025, Vermont's gross domestic product was $48.3 billion, the lowest among all U.S. states.

In 2021, Vermont had a total employment of 239,758, and the total employer establishments were 20,696. As of 2019, Canada was Vermont's largest foreign trade partner, followed by Taiwan. Quebec received 75% of the state's exports to Canada. In 2022, 7,457 new businesses were registered in Vermont. Retail sales reached $10.8 billion in 2017, according to U.S. Census Bureau data.

=== Personal income ===
According to the U.S. Bureau of Economic Analysis, in 2025, Vermont's per capita personal income was $74,580. In 2021, the state had a median household income of $67,674, with approximately 10.3% of the population at or below the poverty line. The median wage in the state was $22.75 hourly or $47,320 annually in 2022. In 2007, about 80% of the 68,000 Vermonters who qualify for food stamps received them. 40% of seniors 75 years or older live on annual incomes of $21,660 or less. In 2011, 15.2% of Vermonters received food stamps. This compares to 14.8% nationally.

In 2011, 91,000 seniors received an annual average of $14,000 from Social Security. This was 59% of the average senior's income. This contributed $1.7 billion to the state's economy.

=== Agriculture ===
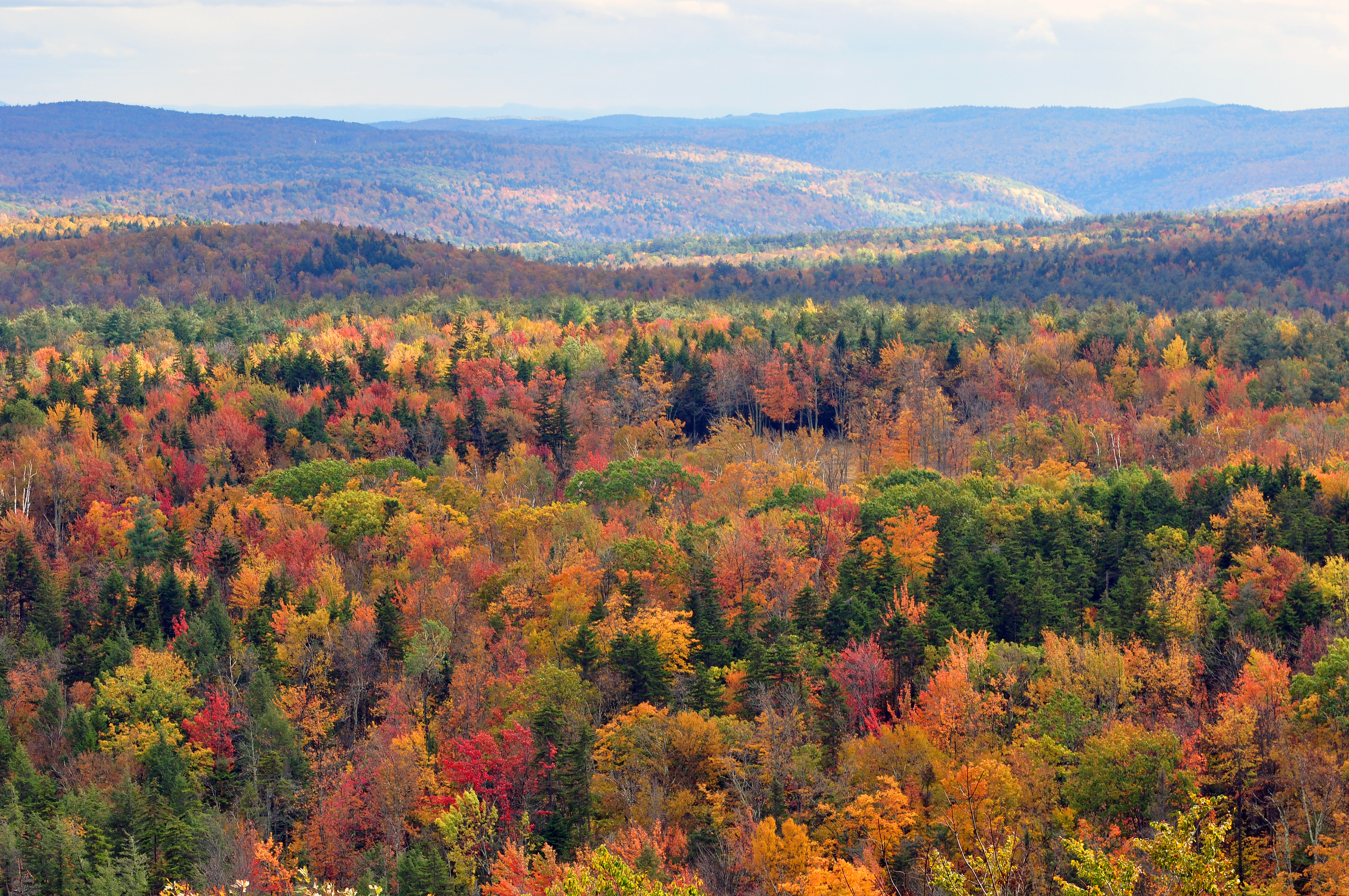
Fall foliage seen from Hogback Mountain, Wilmington

As of 2022, agriculture, along with forestry and other animal industry, contributed 0.45% of the state's gross domestic product. As of May 2022, about 0.16% of the state's working population was engaged in agriculture jobs.

==== Dairy farming ====
Dairy farming remains a primary source of agricultural income. In the second half of the 20th century, developers had plans to build condos and houses on what was relatively inexpensive, open land. Vermont's government responded with a series of laws controlling development to prevent the decline of Vermont's dairy industry. This proved ineffective, as the number of Vermont dairy farms has declined nearly 95% from the 11,206 dairy farms operating in 1947. As of December 2021, the state had 568 dairy farms, a decline from 658 in 2019, 1,138 in 2006, and fewer than 1,500 in 2003. The number of dairy farms has been diminishing by roughly 10% annually. Dairy farms control 80% of open land.

In 2021, 28.5% (162) of the state's dairy farms were certified organic. The number of cattle in Vermont had declined by 40%; however, milk production has doubled in the same period due to tripling the production per cow. While milk production rose, Vermont's market share declined. Within a group of states supplying the Boston and New York City markets (called "Federal order Class I"), Vermont was third in market share, with 10.6%; New York has 44.9% and Pennsylvania has 32.9%. In 2007, dairy farmers received a record $23.60 for 100 pounds (45 kg) (11.63 gallons at $2.03/gallon) of milk. This dropped in 2008 to $17 ($1.46/gallon). The average dairy farm produced 1.3 million pounds of milk annually in 2008.

The dairy barn remains characteristic of Vermont, but the 95% decrease in dairy farms between 1947 and 2021 means that preservation of dairy barns has increasingly become a matter of preserving historic legacy rather than meeting a basic need of an agricultural economy. The Vermont Barn Census, organized in 2009 by educational and nonprofit state and local historic preservation programs, has worked to record the number, condition, and features of barns throughout Vermont.

A significant amount of milk is shipped into the Boston market. Therefore, the Commonwealth of Massachusetts certifies that Vermont farms meet Massachusetts sanitary standards. Without this certification, a farmer may not sell milk for distribution into the bulk market. In 2019, two-thirds of all milk in New England was produced by Vermont dairies.

==== Forestry ====
Forestry has always been a staple to the economy, comprising 1% of the total gross state output and 9% of total manufacturing as of 2013. In 2007, Windham County contained the largest concentration of kilns for drying lumber east of the Mississippi River. The decline of farms has resulted in a regrowth of Vermont's forests due to ecological succession. Today, most of Vermont's forests are secondary. The state and non-profit organizations are actively encouraging regrowth and careful forest management. Over 78% of the land area of the state is forested compared to only 37% in the 1880s, when sheep farming was at its peak and large amounts of acreage were cleared for grazing. Over 85% of that area is non-industrial, private forestland owned by individuals or families. In 2013, 73,054 million cubic feet (2,068.7 million cubic meters) of wood was harvested in Vermont. A large amount of Vermont forest products are exports with 21,504 million feet (6.554×10^{9} meters) being shipped overseas plus an additional 16,384 million cubic feet (463.9 million cubic meters) to Canada. Most of it was processed within the state. In this century the manufacture of wood products has fallen by almost half. The annual net growth has been estimated at 172,810 million cubic feet (4,893 million cubic meters). The USDA estimates that 8,584 billion cubic feet (243.1 billion cubic meters) remain in the state. Forest products also add to carbon sequestration since lumber and timber used in houses and furniture hold carbon for long periods of time while the trees that were removed are replaced overtime with new growing stock.

In 2017, the price of wood products had either plummeted or remained the same when compared to previous decades, which meant there was cause for concern with jobs in the industry. For example, in 1994, the price of a thousand board feet was $300, the same as it was in 2017. The price of wood chips has halved in the same time frame. In 1980, the price for a cord of wood was $50; in 2017, $25. For lack of demand, Vermont's forests are growing twice as fast as they are being cut.

==== Other ====
As of 2022, Vermont was the leading producer of maple syrup in the United States at 2,550,000 US gallons (9,700,000 L), representing 50.7% of the nation's total production. In 2021, its production value totaled $56.0 million at $32.00/gallon. There were about 2,000 maple products producers in 2010. The wine industry in Vermont started in 1985. As of 2007, there were 14 wineries.

As of 2020, apple growing is the third largest contributor to the state's agricultural economy, after dairy and maple syrup. Vermont orchards primarily grow McIntosh apples, and the industry has seen a steady decline as consumer preferences have shifted to newer apple varieties. The number of acres devoted to apple growing decreased from approximately 3,700 in 1997 to just 1,700 in 2017, and many of the orchards now focus on growing apples for cider production and providing Pick-Your-Own orchards to appeal to the state's agritourism market. In 1999, apples and apple pie were named the official state fruit and state pie, respectively. Around 23% of Vermont's vegetable farms are organic.

=== Manufacturing ===
In 2015, GlobalFoundries was the largest private employer in the state and provided jobs to 3,000 employees at its plant in the village of Essex Junction within Chittenden County.

A growing part of Vermont's economy is the manufacture and sale of artisan foods, fancy foods, and novelty items trading in part upon the Vermont "brand", which the state manages and defends. Examples of these specialty exports include Ben and Jerry's Ice Cream, Burton Snowboards, Cabot Cheese, Fine Paints of Europe, King Arthur Flour, the Vermont Teddy Bear Company, Vermont Creamery, several microbreweries, and ginseng growers.

In 2010, a University of Connecticut study reported that Vermont, Rhode Island, and New Hampshire tied as the most costly states in the U.S. for manufacturers.

=== Energy ===
Vermont has no fossil fuel reserves, however its forest products industry provides fuel for electricity generation and home heating. Electricity consumption per capita ranks it among the lowest 20% of states, and total electricity consumption was the lowest in the United States. Vermont consumed three times more electricity than it generated in-state in 2019, and imported its largest share of electricity from Canada. Vermont's 99.9% share of electricity generation from renewable sources was the highest among all 50 states.

=== Health ===
An increasingly aging population is expected to increase demand for aging-related services and healthcare. The University of Vermont Medical Center, with more than 8,800 employees, is the largest employer in the state.

In 2010, all of Vermont's hospitals billed patients $3.76 billion, and collected $2 billion. 92,000 people are enrolled in Medicare. In 2011, Medicare spent $740 million on health care in the state.

=== Labor ===
In 2009, the state attained a high of 361,290 workers.

As of 2006, there were 305,000 workers in Vermont. Eleven percent of these are unionized. Out of a workforce of 299,200 workers, 52,000 were government jobs, federal, state, and local.

A modern high unemployment rate of 9% was reached in June 1976. A modern low of 2.4% was measured in February 2000. As of May 2025, the unemployment rate was 2.6%.

Employment grew 7.5% from 2000 to 2006. From 1980 to 2000, employment grew by 3.4%; nationally it was up 4.6%. Real wages were $33,385 in 2006 constant dollars and remained there in 2010; the nation, $36,871.

As of 2014, the Pew Research Center estimated that farms in the state employed fewer than 5,000 illegal immigrants. In 2017, Vermont Governor Phil Scott announced that the state was "exploring a legal challenge" to the executive order signed by President Donald Trump for Vermont law enforcement authorities to cooperate with U.S. Immigration and Customs Enforcement and "perform the functions of immigration officers in relation to the investigation, apprehension, or detention of aliens".

=== Insurance ===
Captive insurance plays an increasingly large role in Vermont's economy. With this form of alternative insurance, large corporations or industry associations form standalone insurance companies to insure their own risks, thereby substantially reducing their insurance premiums and gaining a significant measure of control over types of risks to be covered. There are also significant tax advantages to be gained from the formation and operation of captive insurance companies. According to the Insurance Information Institute, Vermont in 2009 was the world's third-largest domicile for captive insurance companies, following Bermuda and the Cayman Islands.

In 2009, there were 560 such companies.

In 2010, the state had 900 such companies.

=== Recreation ===
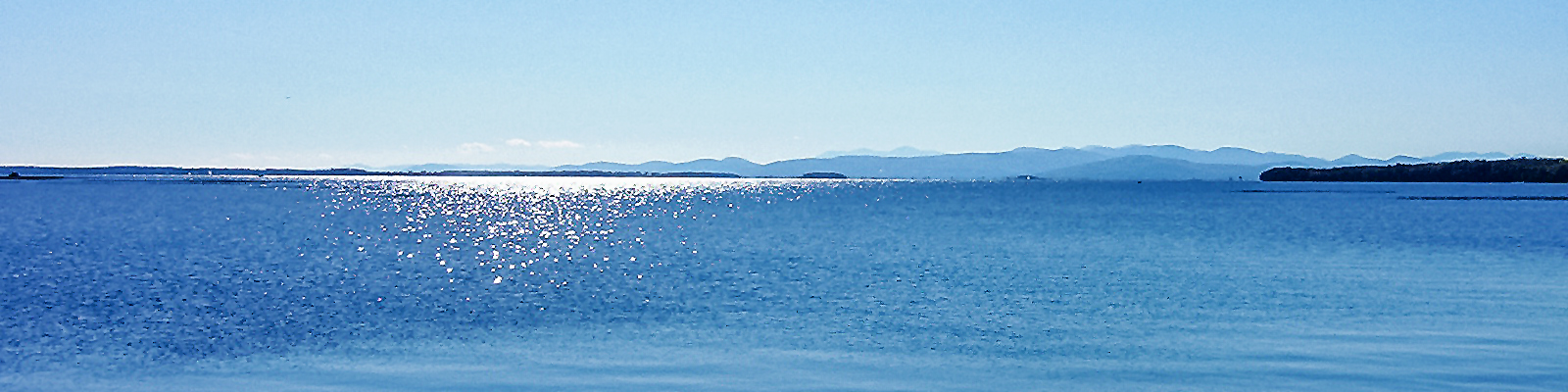
Lake Champlain

Summer camps such as Camp Abnaki, Camp Billings, Camp Dudley, and Camp Hochelaga contribute to Vermont's tourist economy.

In 2005, visitors made an estimated 13.4 million trips to the state, spending $1.57 billion.

In 2012, fall accounted for $460 million of income, about one-quarter of all tourism.

In 2011, the state government earned $274 million in taxes and fees from tourism. 89% of the money came from out-of-state visitors. Tourism supported over 26,000 jobs, 7.2% of total employment.

According to the 2000 census, almost 15% of all housing units in Vermont were vacant because of occupancy classifications "for seasonal, recreational, or occasional use". This was the second highest percentage nationwide, after Maine. In some Vermont cities, vacation homes owned by wealthy residents of New England and New York constitute the bulk of all housing stock. According to one estimate, as of 2009, 84% of all houses in Ludlow were owned by out-of-state residents. Other notable vacation-home resorts include Manchester and Stowe.

==== Hunting ====
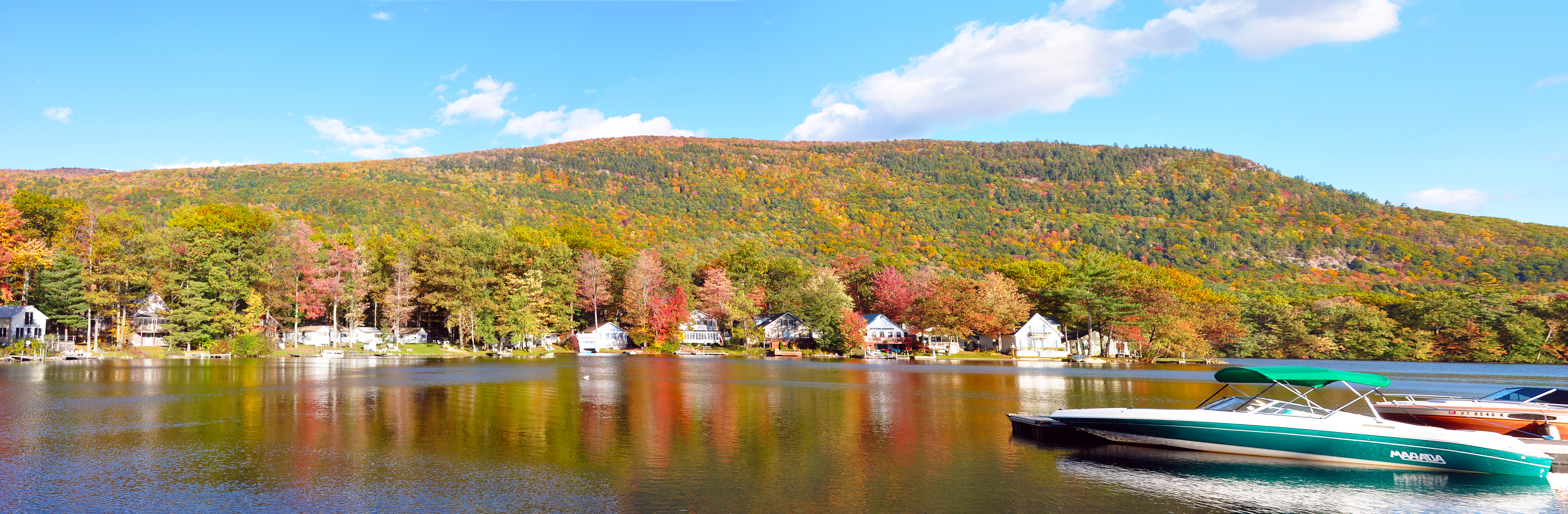
Autumn in Vermont

Hunting is controlled for black bear, wild turkeys, deer, and moose. There are 5,500 bears in the state. The goal is to keep the numbers between 4,500 and 6,000.

In 2010, there were about 141,000 deer in the state, which is in range of government goals. However, these are distributed unevenly and when in excess of 10–15 per square mile (4–6/km^{2}), reduce timber growth.

In 2012, hunting of migratory birds was limited to October 13 to December 16. Waterfowl hunting is also controlled by federal law.

==== Skiing and snowmobiling ====
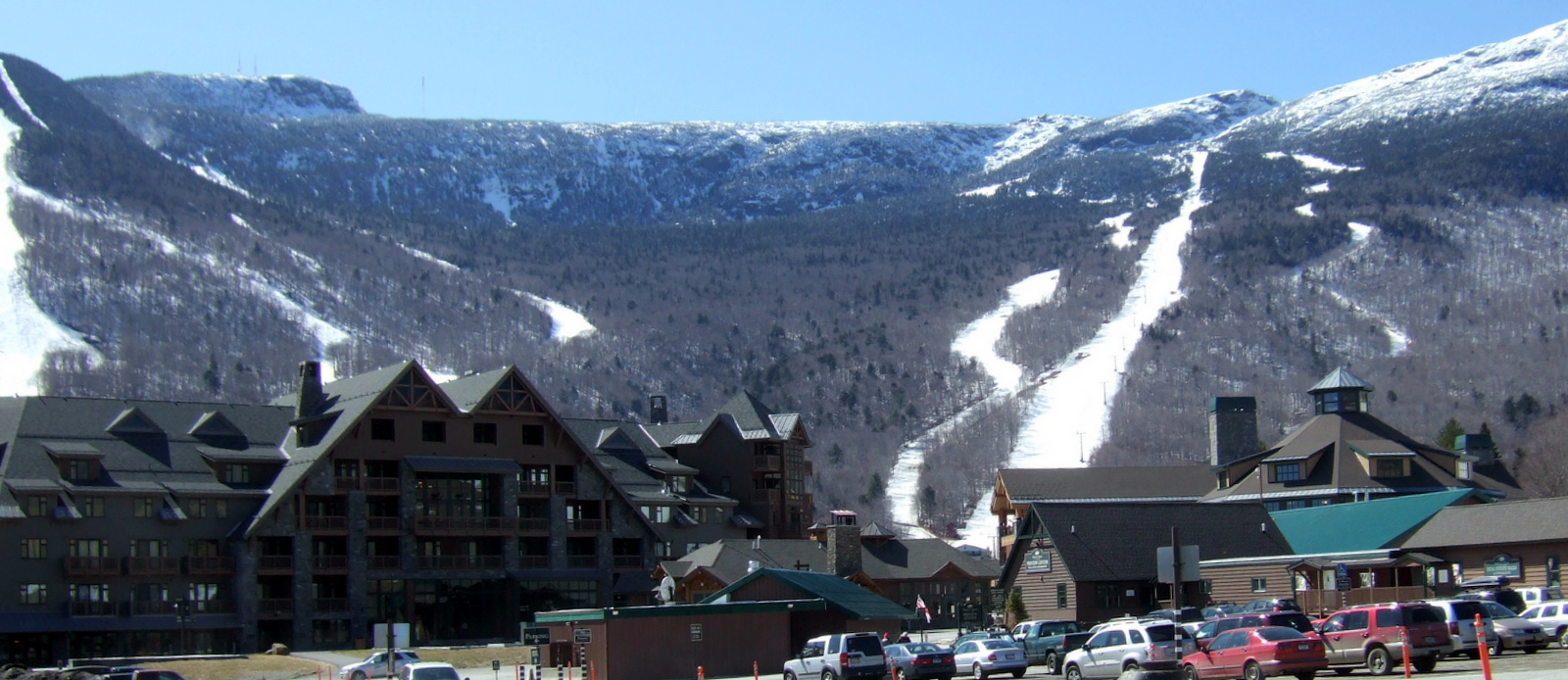
Stowe Resort Village

Some of the largest ski areas in New England are located in Vermont. Skiers and snowboarders visit Burke Mountain Ski Area, Bolton Valley, Smugglers' Notch, Killington Ski Resort, Mad River Glen, Stowe Mountain Resort, Cochrans Ski Area, Sugarbush, Stratton, Jay Peak, Okemo, Saskadena Six, Mount Snow, Bromley, Brattleboro Ski Hill, and Magic Mountain Ski Area. Summer visitors tour resort towns like Stowe, Manchester, Quechee, Wilmington, Woodstock, Mount Snow, and. The effects of global warming have been predicted to shorten the length of the ski season across Vermont, which would continue the contraction and consolidation of the ski industry in Vermont and threaten individual ski businesses and communities that rely on ski tourism.

In winter, Nordic and backcountry skiers visit to travel the length of the state on the Catamount Trail. Several horse shows are annual events. Vermont's state parks, historic sites, museums, golf courses, and new boutique hotels with spas were designed to attract tourists.

In 2000–2001, there were 4,579,719 skier and snowboarder visits to the state. There were 4,125,082 visits in 2009–2010, a rise from recent years.

In 2008, there were 35,000 members of 138 snowmobiling clubs in Vermont. The combined association of clubs maintains 6,000 miles (9,700 km) of trail often over private lands. The industry is said to generate "hundreds of millions of dollars worth of business."

=== Quarrying ===
The towns of Rutland and Barre are the traditional centers of marble and granite quarrying and carving in the U.S. For many years Vermont was also the headquarters of the smallest union in the U.S., the Journeymen Stonecutters' Association of North America, of about 500 members. The first marble quarry in America was on Mount Aeolus overlooking East Dorset. The granite industry attracted numerous skilled stonecutters in the late 19th century from Italy, Scotland, and Ireland. Barre is the location of the Rock of Ages quarry, the largest dimension stone granite quarry in the United States. Vermont is the largest producer of slate in the country. The highest quarrying revenues result from the production of dimension stone. The Rock of Ages quarry in Barre is one of the leading exporters of granite in the country. The work of the sculptors of this corporation can be seen 3 miles (4.8 km) down the road at the Hope Cemetery, where there are gravestones and mausoleums.

=== Nonprofits and volunteerism ===
There were 2,682 nonprofit organizations in Vermont in 2008, with $2.8 billion in revenue. The state ranked ninth in the country for volunteerism for the period 2005–08. 35.6% of the population volunteered during this period. The national average was 26.4%.

== Education ==
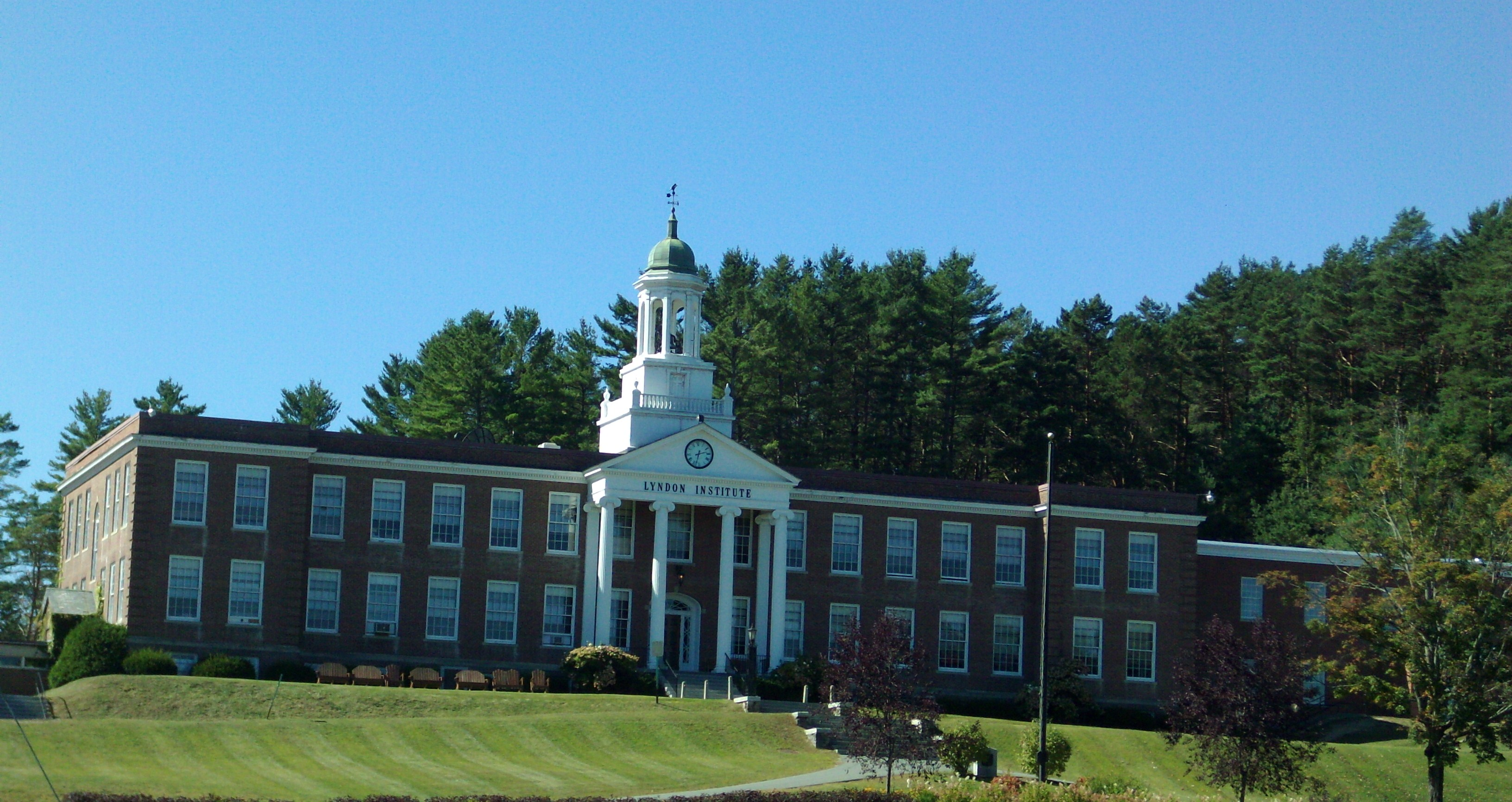
Lyndon Institute, a non-profit high school in Lyndon with both day and boarding students.

Vermont was named the nation's smartest state in 2005 and 2006. In 2006, there was a gap between state testing standards and national, which is biased in favor of the state standards by 30%, on average. This puts Vermont 11th-best in the nation. Most states have a higher bias. However, when allowance for race is considered, a 2007 U.S. Government list of test scores shows Vermont white fourth graders performed 25th in the nation for reading (229) and 26th for math (247). White eighth graders scored 18th for math (292) and 12th for reading (273). The first three scores were not considered statistically different from average. White eighth graders scored significantly above average in reading. Statistics for black students were not reliable because of their small representation in the testing.

In 2017, spending $1.6 billion on education for 76,000 public school children, represented more than $21,000 per student.

Education Week ranked the state second (Note: Behind New Jersey) in high school graduation rates for 2007.

In 2011, 91% of the population had graduated from high school compared with 85% nationally. Almost 34% have at least an undergraduate degree compared with 28% nationally.

In 2013, the ratio of pupils to teachers was the lowest in the country.

=== Higher education ===
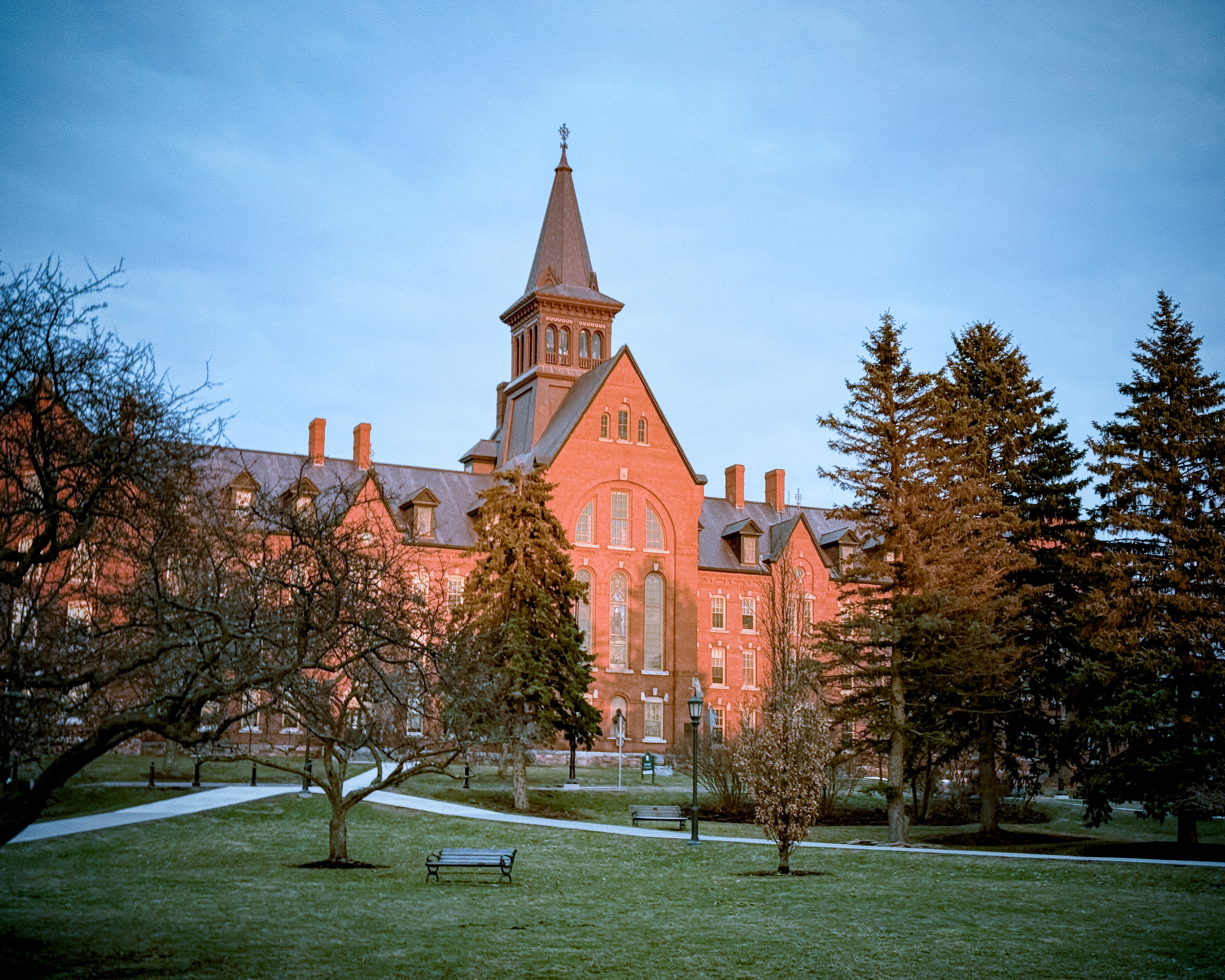
The University of Vermont's Old Mill, the oldest campus building

Vermont's largest university is The University of Vermont (UVM), a public land-grant research university and one of the original eight Public Ivies. In addition, Vermont State University and the Community College of Vermont reside within the Vermont State Colleges system. The state has several other private colleges, including Bennington College, Champlain College, Middlebury College, Norwich University, Saint Michael's College, and Vermont Law and Graduate School.

Research at the University of Vermont by George Perkins Marsh and the influence of Vermont-born philosopher and educator John Dewey brought about the concepts of electives and learning-by-doing.

== Transportation ==
The Vermont Agency of Transportation (VTrans) is responsible for transportation infrastructure. The principal mode of travel in Vermont is via car, with 93.4% of Vermont households owning a car in 2021. Four car ferry routes operate across Lake Champlain. Passenger rail is provided by Amtrak's daily Vermonter and Ethan Allen Express trains. Intercity bus operators include Vermont Translines, Greyhound Lines, and Megabus. A number of public transit agencies operate bus service at the local, county, and regional levels. Patrick Leahy Burlington International Airport is the state's primary airport.

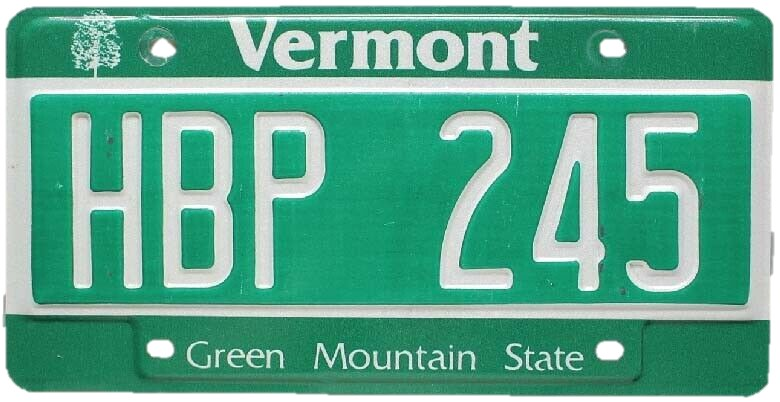
Vermont's license plate

=== Road ===
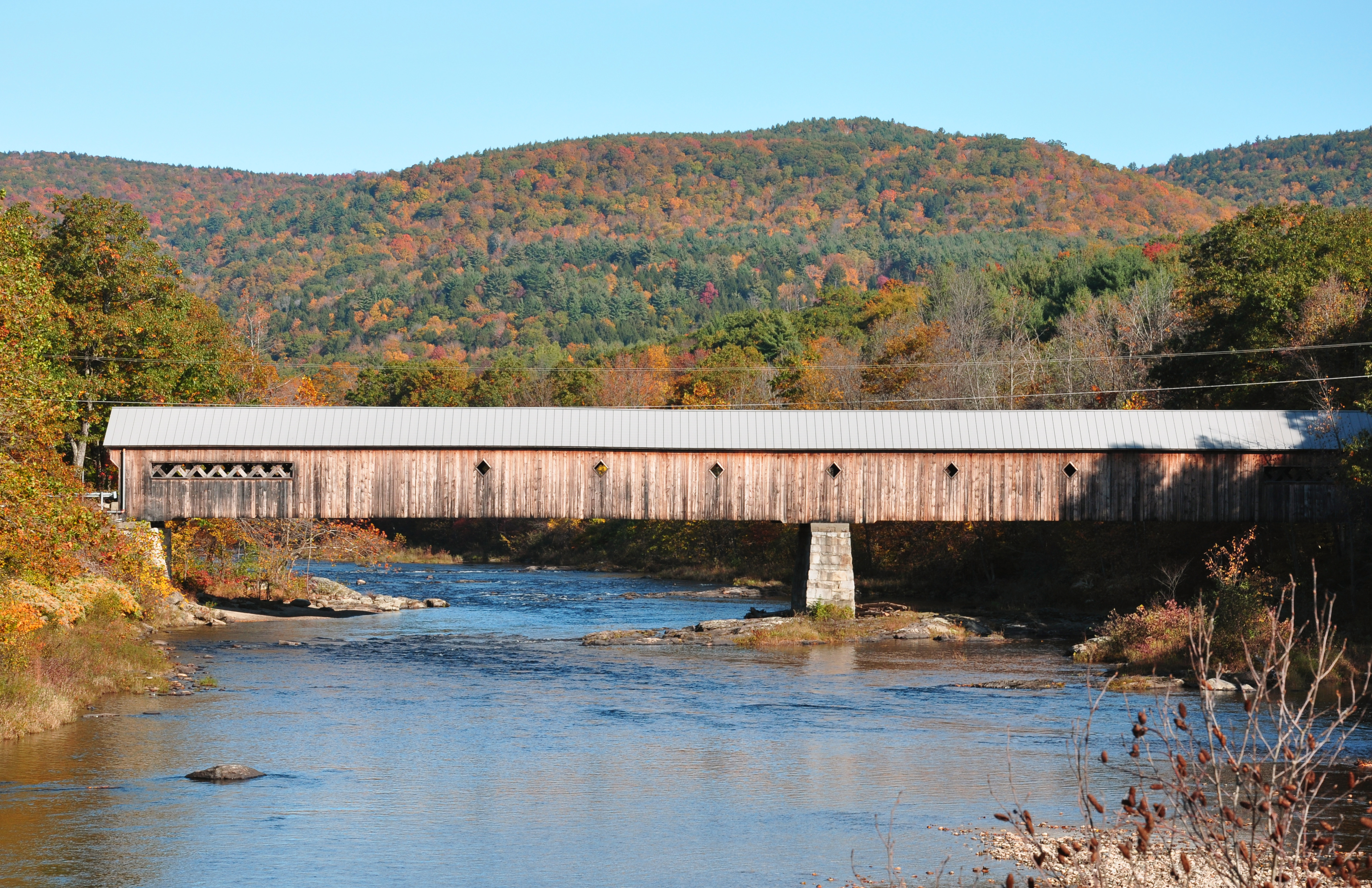
The West Dummerston Bridge, the longest covered bridge in Vermont

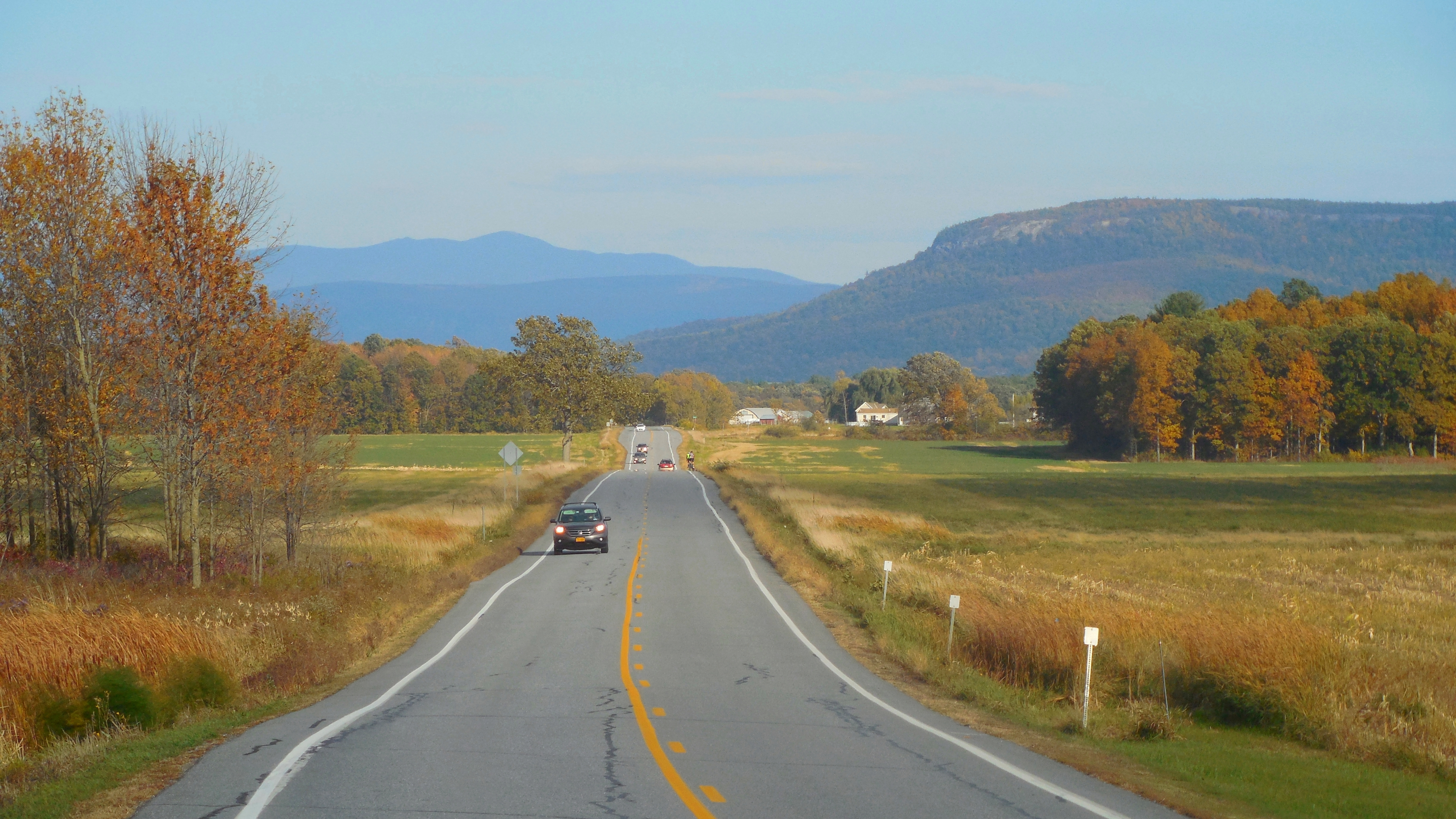
Vermont Route 17 in Addison with Snake Mountain at right

In 2012, there were 605,000 vehicles registered, nearly one for every person. This is similar to average car ownership nationwide. In 2012, about half of greenhouse gas emissions in the state were from vehicles.

In 2010, Vermont owned 2,840 miles (4,570 km) of highway. This was the third smallest quantity among the 50 states. 2.5% of the highways were listed as "congested", the fifth lowest in the country. The highway fatality rate was one per 100,000,000 miles (160,000,000 km), tenth lowest in the nation. The highways cost $28,669 per mile ($17,814/km) to maintain, the 17th highest in the states. 34.4% of its 2,691 bridges were rated deficient or obsolete, the eighth worst in the nation. A 2005–06 study ranked Vermont 37th out of the states for "cost-effective road maintenance", a decline of thirteen places since 2004–05.

In 2007, Vermont was ranked the third safest state for highway fatalities. One third of these fatal crashes involved a drunken driver. On average, 20–25 people die each year from drunk driving incidents, and 70–80 people are in fatal car crashes in the state. Collisions with moose constitute a traffic threat, particularly in northern Vermont, and cause several deaths per year. In 2009, 93% of Vermont motorists were insured, tying with Pennsylvania for the highest percentage. In 2008, Vermont was the fifth best state for fewest uninsured motorists at 6%.

Trucks weighing less than 80,000 pounds (36,000 kg) can use Vermont's interstate highways. The limit for state roads is 99,000 pounds (45,000 kg). This means that vehicles too heavy for the interstates can legally use only secondary roads.

In 1968, Vermont outlawed the use of billboards for advertisement along its roads. It is one of only four states in the U.S. to have done this, along with Hawaii, Maine, and Alaska, and is a source of pride among Vermonters. The consensus from the state's Act 250 commission was that billboards obstruct and distract from scenic views of countryside, critical to Vermont's pastoral image.

==== Major north–south routes ====
- Interstate 89 runs a northwest–southeast path through Vermont, beginning in White River Junction and heading northwest to serve the cities of Montpelier, Burlington, and St. Albans en route to the Canada–U.S. border. I-89 intersects I-91 in White River Junction and has a short spur route, Interstate 189, just outside of Burlington.
- Interstate 91 runs a north–south path from the Massachusetts state line to the Canada–U.S. border, connecting the towns of Brattleboro, White River Junction, St. Johnsbury, and the city of Newport. I-91 intersects I-89 in White River Junction, and I-93 in St. Johnsbury.
- Interstate 93 runs a short, 11-mile (18 km) distance from the New Hampshire state line to its northern terminus in St. Johnsbury, where it intersects I-91. I-93 connects the Northeast Kingdom region of Vermont with the White Mountains region of New Hampshire, and points south.
- U.S. Route 5 runs a north–south path in eastern Vermont from the Massachusetts state line to the Canada-U.S. border. U.S. Route 5 is a surface road that runs parallel to I-91 for its entire length in the state, and serves nearly all the same towns. The two routes also parallel the New Hampshire state line between Brattleboro and St. Johnsbury.
- U.S. Route 7 runs a north–south path in western Vermont from the Massachusetts state line to the Canada-U.S. border. U.S. Route 7 connects the cities and towns of Bennington, Rutland, Middlebury, Burlington, and St. Albans. Between Bennington and Dorset, U.S. Route 7 runs as a Super 2 freeway. It also parallels I-89 between Burlington and the Canada–U.S. border.
- Vermont Route 30 is a 111.870-mile-long north–south road that runs from Brattleboro to Middlebury. Vermont Route 30 runs through the state's historic West River Valley, where it passes through the colonial towns of Newfane, Townshend, West Townshend, East Jamaica, Jamaica, Rawsonville and Bondville.
- Vermont Route 100 runs a north–south path directly through the center of the state, along the length of the Green Mountains. VT Route 100 generally parallels both U.S. Route 5 (which runs to its east) and U.S. Route 7 (which runs to its west). Many of the state's major ski areas are located either directly on, or very close to, VT Route 100. The largest town by population along VT Route 100 is Morristown.

==== Major east–west routes ====
- U.S. Route 2 runs a generally east–west path across central and northern Vermont, from Alburgh (on the New York state line) to Guildhall (on the New Hampshire state line). U.S. Route 2 connects the Lake Champlain Islands and the Northeast Kingdom to the population centers of Burlington, Montpelier, and St. Johnsbury. U.S. Route 2 runs parallel to I-89 between Colchester and Montpelier. Although the portion of the road from Alburgh to Burlington follows a north–south orientation, U.S. Route 2 in Vermont is entirely signed as east–west.
- U.S. Route 4 runs east–west across south-central Vermont from Fair Haven (on the New York state line) to White River Junction (on the New Hampshire state line). U.S. Route 4 also connects the city of Rutland and the towns of Killington and Woodstock. Between Fair Haven and Rutland, U.S. Route 4 runs as a four-lane freeway that is mostly up to Interstate design standards.
- U.S. Route 302 runs an east–west path from its western terminus in Montpelier to the village of Wells River, where it intersects both I-91 and U.S. Route 5, and then crosses into New Hampshire. U.S. Route 302 is one of the main roads connecting Montpelier and Barre in central Vermont.
- Vermont Route 9 runs an east–west path across the southern part of the state. VT Route 9 connects the towns of Bennington, Wilmington, and Brattleboro.
- Vermont Route 105 runs a generally east–west path across the northernmost parts of Vermont (sometimes within a few miles of the Canada–U.S. border) from St. Albans to Bloomfield (on the New Hampshire state line). VT Route 105 ultimately connects the cities of St. Albans and Newport.

=== Ferry ===
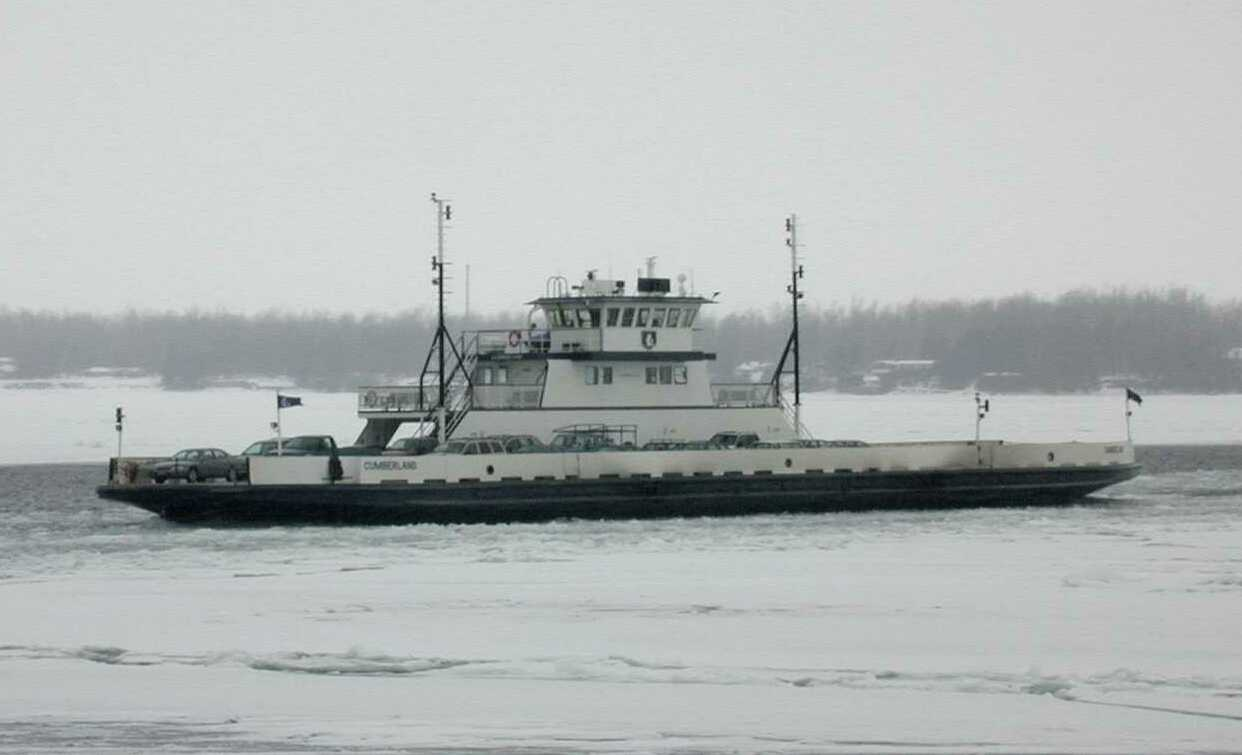
The Cumberland ice-breaking ferry headed toward Grand Isle in winter

There is a year-round ferry service to and from New York State across Lake Champlain from Charlotte to Essex and Grand Isle to Plattsburgh. Operated by the Lake Champlain Transportation Company (LCTC), the Grand Isle - Plattsburgh ferry operates 24 hours a day, while the Charlotte ferry serves a limited schedule.

Seasonal service from Shoreham to Ticonderoga is provided by the Fort Ticonderoga Ferry.

=== Rail ===
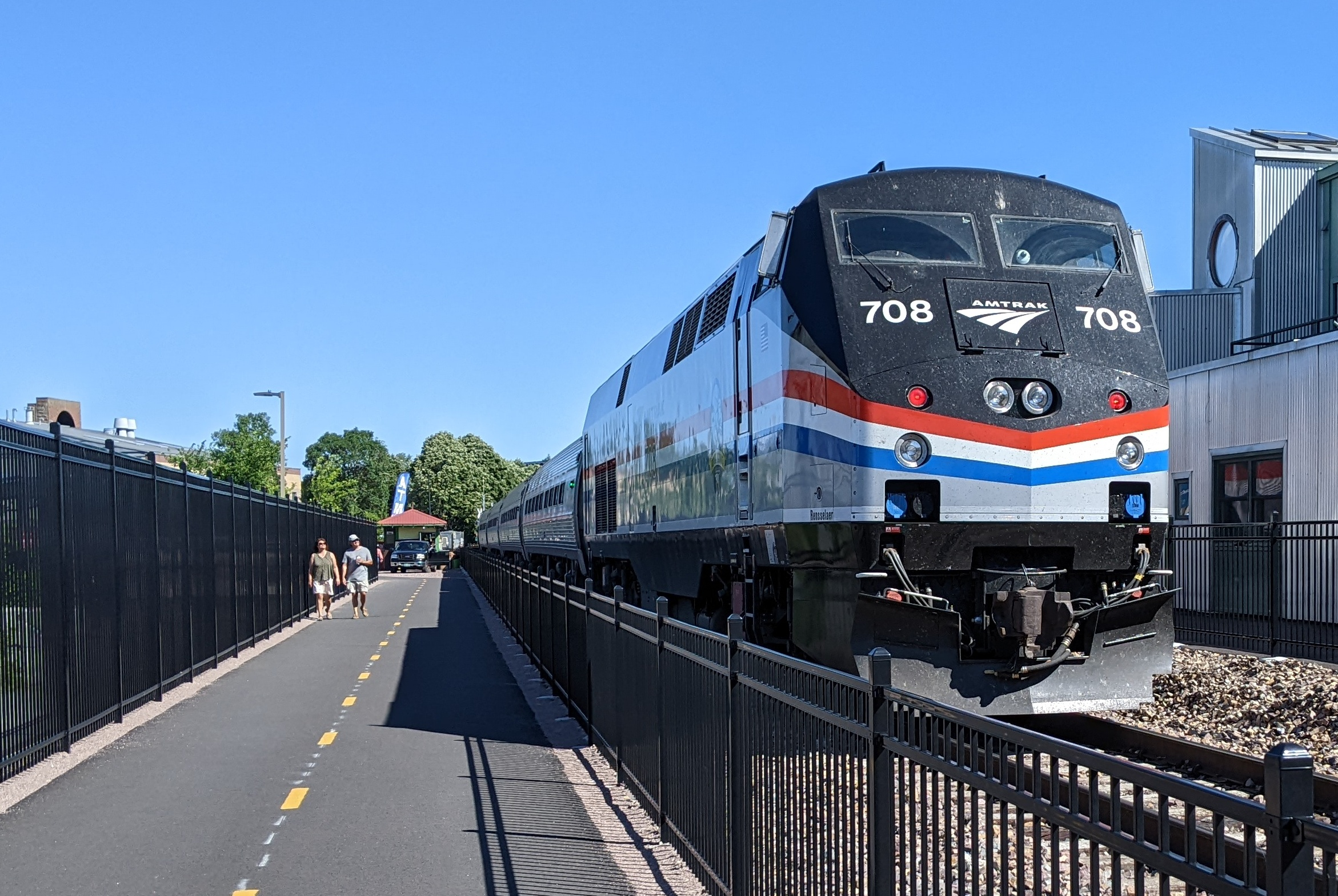
The Ethan Allen Express alongside the Island Line Trail in Burlington

Passenger service is provided by Amtrak's Vermonter and Ethan Allen Express, while freight service is provided by the New England Central Railroad, the Vermont Railway, and the Green Mountain Railroad.

The Ethan Allen Express serves Burlington Union Station, Ferrisburgh–Vergennes, Middlebury, Rutland, and Castleton, while the Vermonter serves St. Albans, Essex Junction, Waterbury, Montpelier, Randolph, White River Junction, Windsor, Bellows Falls, and Brattleboro.

=== Intercity bus ===
Greyhound Lines stops in Bennington, Bellows Falls, Brandon, Burlington, Colchester, Ferrisburgh, Manchester, Middlebury, Montpelier, Rutland, Wallingford, and White River Junction. Vermont Translines, an intercity bus company founded by Premier Coach in 2013 partnering with Greyhound and starting service on June 9, 2014, serves Milton, Colchester, Burlington, Middlebury, Brandon, Rutland, Wallingford, Manchester and Bennington. Additionally, Bennington hosts the weekday-operating Albany-Bennington Shuttle, an intercity bus operated by Yankee Trails World Travel.

=== Local bus ===
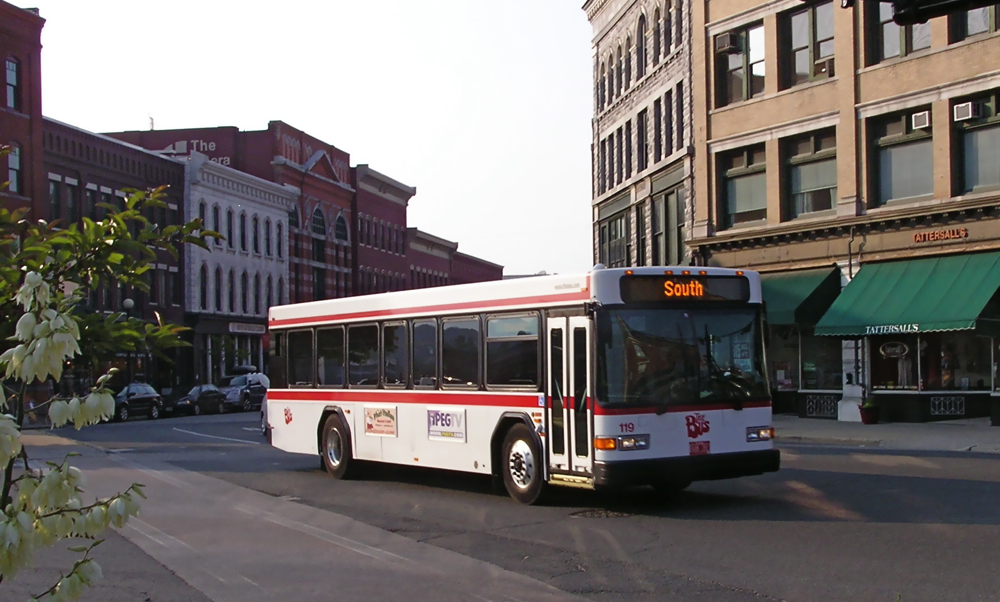
MVRTD's "The Bus" in Rutland

A patchwork of transit providers operate local bus service in every Vermont county, though route frequency and coverage are often limited outside major cities. Many operators also provide paratransit and regional express bus services. Green Mountain Transit is the largest operator in the state, with weekday ridership of 7,300 as of the second quarter of 2026. Other major systems are Marble Valley Regional Transit District (The Bus), Southeast Vermont Transit (MOOver), Tri-Valley Transit, Rural Community Transportation, Advance Transit, and Green Mountain Community Network.

=== Air ===
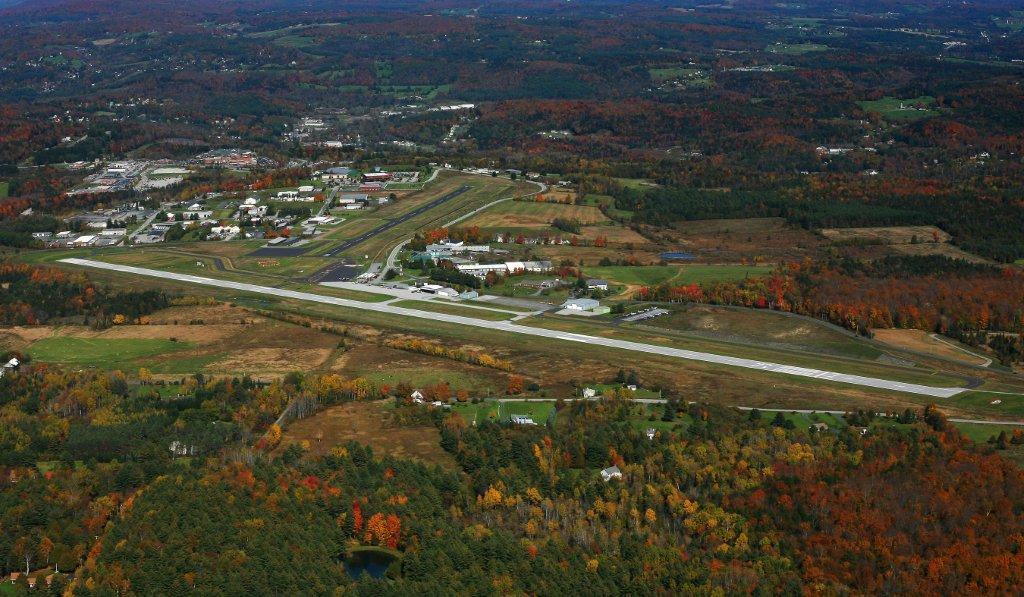
Edward F. Knapp State Airport in Berlin

Patrick Leahy Burlington International Airport is the largest in the state, with regular flights to Atlanta, Charlotte, Chicago, Denver, Detroit, Washington Dulles, JFK, LaGuardia, Newark, Orlando, and Philadelphia. Airlines serving the airport include American, Breeze, Delta, Sun Country, and United. Beta Technologies operates an eVTOL manufacturing and testing facility at the airport. Additionally, the airport houses the 134th fighter squadron of the 158th fighter wing. Known as the "Green Mountain Boys", the squadron is armed with the Lockheed Martin F-35 Lightning II and is tasked with protecting the Northeastern United States from the air.

Rutland-Southern Vermont Regional Airport has three daily flights to Boston via Cape Air.

== Media ==
=== Newspapers of record ===
Vermont statute requires the Vermont Secretary of State to designate newspapers that provide general coverage across the state as the Newspapers of Record. As of 2019, these include:

- Addison Independent
- Bennington Banner
- Brattleboro Reformer
- Burlington Free Press
- Caledonian Record
- The Chronicle
- Islander
- Newport Daily Express
- News & Citizen
- Rutland Herald
- Seven Days
- St. Albans Messenger
- Times Argus
- Valley News
- Vermont Lawyer
- The White River Valley Herald

=== Broadcast and web media ===
Vermont hosts 93 radio broadcast stations. The top categories are talk/information (11), country (9) and classic rock (9). The top owner of radio broadcast stations is Vermont Public Radio (11 broadcast frequencies and 13 low-power, local transmitters). Other companies had five or fewer stations. The state has 15 online radio stations.

Vermont hosts 10 high-power television broadcast stations, three of which are satellites of a primary station. Represented are the following networks and number of high-power transmitters, ABC (1), CBS (1), Fox (1), NBC (2), PBS (4), and RTV (1). In addition, it has 17 low-power television broadcast stations, which in several cases are satellites of the high-power stations.

The "Rumble Strip" podcast features conversations with everyday Vermonters and in 2021 won a Peabody award.

== Electrical utilities ==
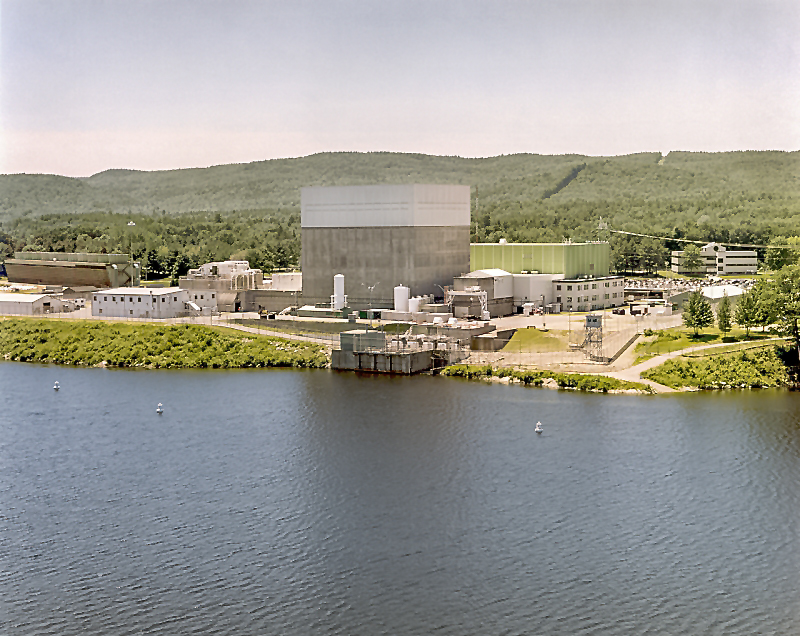
The former Vermont Yankee Nuclear Power Plant, in Vernon

Vermont electric power needs are served by over twenty utilities. The largest is Green Mountain Power, a subsidiary of Énergir which also took over Central Vermont Public Service. Together this company represents 70% of the retail customers in Vermont. The state is a small electricity consumer compared with other states. Therefore, its electricity sector has the lowest carbon footprint in the country. As of 2010, the state had the lowest wholesale electricity costs in New England.

== Public health ==
In 2010, Vermont was the sixth highest ranked state for Well-Being in a study by Gallup and Healthways. In 2010, the state stood third in physical well-being of children.

In 2010, Vermont was ranked the highest in the country for health outcomes.

In 2000, the state implemented the Vermont Child Health Improvement Program to improve preventive services and management of chronic conditions. In 2011, the state ranked third in the nation in child health system performance. In 2011, the March of Dimes gave Vermont an "A", ranking it number one in the country on its Prematurity Report Card.

The state scored well in cessation of smoking, obesity, fewer occupational fatalities, prevalence of health insurance, and low infant mortality. A problem area was a high prevalence of binge drinking. While ranking sixth from best for adults in obesity in 2009, the state still had 22% obese with a rate of 27% for children 10–17. The ranking for children was ninth best in the nation. In 1993, the obesity rate for adults was 12%. Vermonters spend $141 million annually in medical costs related to obesity. The combined figures for overweight and obese adults rose from 40.7% in 1990 to 58.4% in 2010. This is better than most other states.

In 2011, Vermont led the nation in the rate of young people who had consumed alcohol in the past month; one-third of people aged 11 through 20. One-fifth of that group had binged during that time. The state was second for the use of marijuana by young people; 30% of adults 18 to 25 in the past month.

In 2009, Vermont was ranked second in the nation for safety. Crime statistics on violence were used for the criteria.

In 2007, Vermont was ranked among the best five states in the country for preventing "premature death" in people under 75 years of age. The rate of survival was twice that of the five lowest performing states.

Parts of the state have been declared federal disaster areas on 28 occasions from 1963 to 2008.

In 2007, the Environmental Protection Agency cited Chittenden and Bennington as counties with 70 parts per billion of smog which is undesirable.

In 2008, about 100,000 Vermonters got their health care through the federal government, Medicare, Tri-Care, and the Veteran's Administration. An additional 10,000 Vermonters work for employers who provide insurance under federal law under ERISA. About 20% of Vermonters receive health care outside of Vermont; 20% of the care provided within the state is to non-Vermonters. In 2008, the state had an estimated 7.6% with no medical insurance, down from 9.8% in 2005. In 2008, the Vermont Health Access Program for low-income, uninsured adults cost from $7 to $49 per month. A "Catamount Health" premium assistance program was available for Vermonters who do not qualify for other programs. Total monthly premiums ranged from $60 to $393 for an individual. There was a $250 deductible. Insured paid $10 toward each generic prescription. 16.9% of residents 18 to 35 were uninsured, the highest group.

Health care spending increased from $2.3 billion in 2000 to $4.8 billion in 2009. In 2009, adult day care services cost more in Vermont than any other state—$150 daily.

The state started air drops of rabies bait for raccoons in 1997. Known rabies cases in raccoons peaked in 2007 at 165. The program is in cooperation with neighboring states and Canada.

== Law and government ==
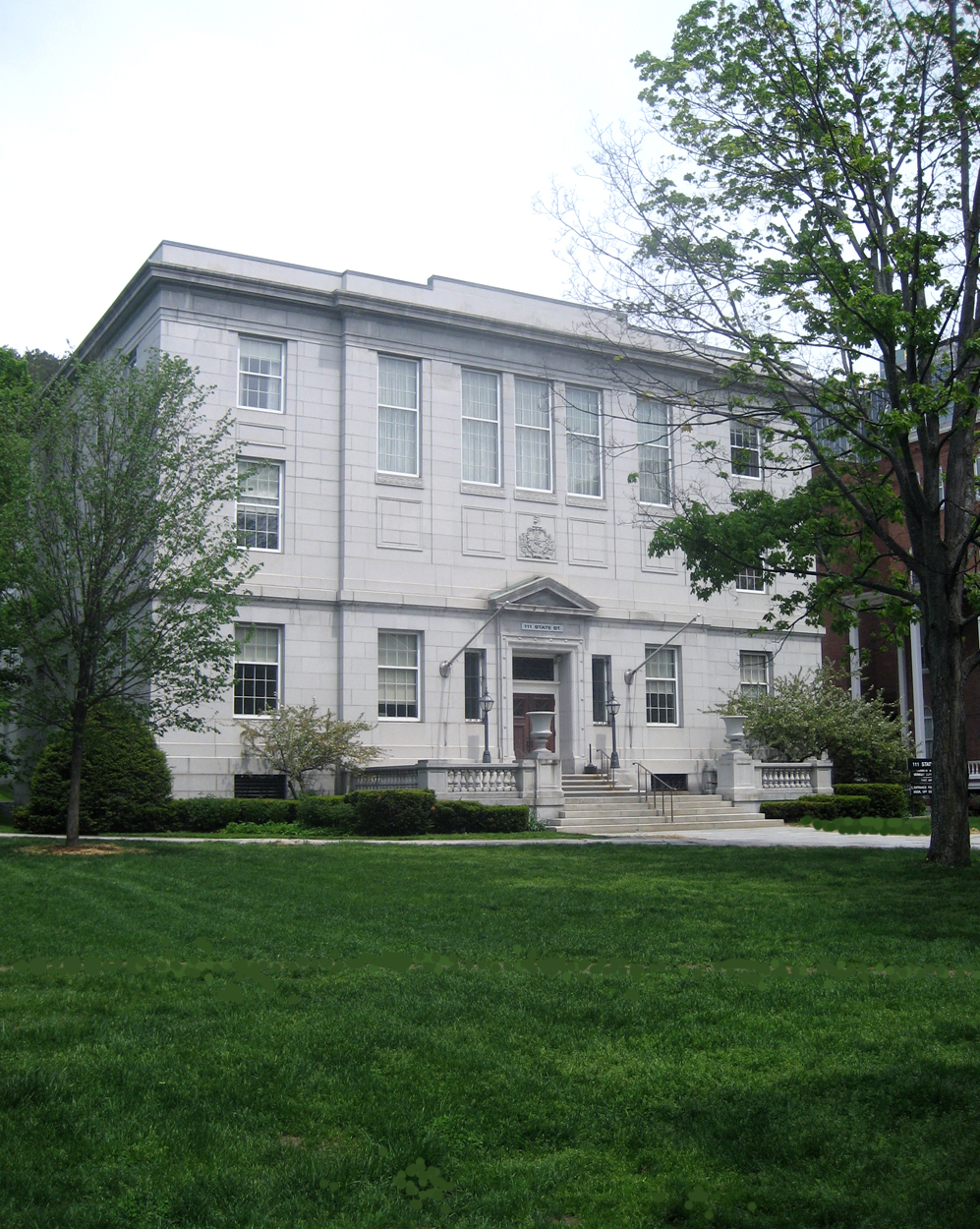
The Vermont Supreme Court's building in Montpelier

Vermont is federally represented in the United States Congress by two senators and one representative.

The state is governed by a constitution which divides governmental duties into legislative, executive, and judicial branches: the Vermont General Assembly, the governor of Vermont and the Vermont Supreme Court. The governorship and the General Assembly serve two-year terms including the governor, 30 senators, and 150 representatives. There are no term limits for any office. The state capital is in Montpelier.

There are three types of incorporated municipalities in Vermont: towns, cities, and villages. Like most of New England, there is slight provision for autonomous county government. Counties and county seats are merely convenient repositories for various government services such as state courts, with several elected officers such as a state's attorney and sheriff. All county services are directly funded by the state of Vermont. The next effective governmental level below state government are municipalities. Most of these are towns.

=== Finances and taxation ===
Vermont is the only state in the union not to have a balanced-budget requirement, though it has had a balanced budget every year since 1991.

In 2007, Moody's gave its top bond credit rating (Aaa) to the state.

The state uses enterprise funds for operations that are similar to private business enterprises. The Vermont Lottery Commission, the Liquor Control Fund, and the Unemployment Compensation Trust Fund, are the largest of the State's enterprise funds.

Also in 2007, Vermont was the 14th highest out of 50 states and the District of Columbia for state and local taxation, with a per capita load of $3,681. The national average was $3,447.

Vermont collects a state personal income tax in a progressive structure of five different income brackets, with marginal tax rates ranging from 3.6% to 9.5%. In 2008, the top 1% of Vermont residents provided 30% of the income tax revenue; around 2,000 people had sufficient income to be taxed at the highest marginal rate of 9.5%.

Vermont's general state sales tax rate is 6%, which is imposed on sales of tangible personal property, amusement charges, fabrication charges, some public utility charges and some service contracts. Some towns and cities impose an additional 1% Local Option Tax. There are 46 exemptions from the sales tax, including exemptions for food, medical items, manufacturing machinery, equipment and fuel, residential fuel and electricity, clothing, and shoes. A use tax is imposed on the buyer at the same rate as the sales tax. The buyer pays the use tax when the seller fails to collect the sales tax or the items are purchased from a source where no tax is collected. The use tax applies to items taxable under the sales tax.

Vermont does not collect inheritance taxes, but does impose a state estate tax; a Vermont estate tax return must be filed if the estate must file a federal estate tax return (the requirement for which depends on federal law). Vermont does not collect a gift tax.

Property taxes are levied by municipalities for the support of education and municipal services. Vermont does not assess tax on personal property. Property taxes are based on appraisal of the fair market value of real property. Rates vary from 0.97% on homesteaded property in Ferdinand, Essex County, to 2.72% on nonresidents' property in Barre City. Statewide, towns average 1.77% to 1.82% tax rate.

In 2007, Vermont counties were among the highest in the country for property taxes. Chittenden ($3,809 median), Windham ($3,412), Addison ($3,352), and Windsor ($3,327) ranked in the top 100, out of 1,817 counties in the nation with populations greater than 20,000. Twelve of the state's 14 counties stood in the top 20%. Median annual property taxes as a percentage of median homeowners income, 5.4%, was rated as the third highest in the nation in 2011. (Note: Average property taxes as % of median income: 5.4% (3rd most in the U.S.). Average median property taxes paid on homes: $4,618 (3rd most in the U.S.). Unemployment rate: 5.6% (5th lowest in the U.S.). Average median income for home owners: $77,161 (7th highest in the U.S.).)

To equitably support education, some towns are required by Act 60 to send some of their collected taxes to be redistributed to school districts lacking adequate support.

=== Politics ===
Vermont is one of four states (Texas, California, and Hawaii) that previously claimed status as independent nations. Vermont is the only state to have voted for presidential candidate William Wirt from the Anti-Masonic Party, and Vermont was one of only two states to vote against Franklin D. Roosevelt in all four of his presidential campaigns (the other was Maine).

Vermont's history of independent political thought has led to movements for the establishment of the Second Vermont Republic and other plans advocating secession.

Vermont is the only state in the United States that requires voters to be sworn in, having established the voter's oath or affirmation in 1777. All white men were granted universal suffrage in 1777.

==== State politics ====
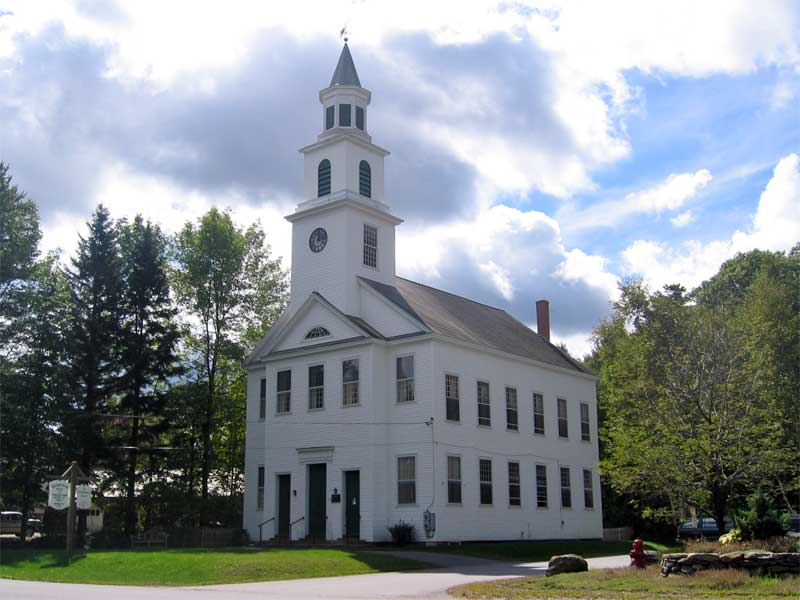
Vermont towns hold a March town meeting for voters to approve the town's budget and decide other matters. Marlboro voters meet in this building.

Republicans dominated local Vermont politics from the party's founding in 1854 until the mid-1970s, and at the presidential level until the 1990s. Before the 1960s, rural interests dominated the legislature. As a result, cities, particularly the older sections of Burlington and Winooski, were neglected and fell into decay, and people began to move out to newer suburbs.

A series of one man, one vote decisions made by the United States Supreme Court in the 1960s required states to redraw their legislative districts to accurately reflect population. As a result, urban areas in Vermont gained political power.

The legislature was redistricted under one-person, one-vote in the 1960s. It passed the Land Use and Development Law (Act 250) in 1970, to discourage suburban sprawl and to limit major growth to already developed areas. The law, the first of its kind in the nation, created nine District Environmental Commissions appointed by the governor, who judged land development and subdivision plans that would affect the state's environment and many small communities significantly. As a result of Act 250, Vermont was the last state to get a Walmart (there are now six Walmarts in the state, as of November 2017, but only three — in Williston, St. Albans, and Derby — were newly built from the ground up). Vermont has been designated one of America's most "endangered historic places" by the National Trust for Historic Preservation.

From 1856 (the first presidential election after the Republican Party's founding) to 1988, Vermont voted Republican in every presidential election except 1964, when Democrat Lyndon B. Johnson became the first of his party to carry the state amidst a national landslide. Since 1992, Vermont has voted Democratic in every presidential election, marking a massive shift in the state's politics.

In 1995, the state banned the spreading of manure from December 15 to April 1, to prevent run-off and protect the water. Therefore, farms must have environmentally approved facilities to store manure during this time frame.

While the state voted largely Democratic, Republican governor Douglas won all counties but Windham in the 2006 election.

In 1999 Vermont became the first U.S. state to adopt civil unions, an institution which grants same-sex couples nearly all the rights and privileges of marriage at the state, but not federal, level. In Baker v. Vermont (1999), the Vermont Supreme Court ruled that, under the Constitution of Vermont, the state must either allow same-sex marriage or provide a "separate, but equal" status for them. The state legislature chose the second option, by creating the institution of civil union; the bill was passed by the legislature and signed into law by Governor Howard Dean.

In April 2009, the state legislature overrode governor Jim Douglas's veto to allow same-sex marriage, becoming the first state in the nation to legalize same-sex marriage through legislation. In September 2009, Vermont became the fourth state in which same-sex couples could marry. The previous three were Massachusetts, Connecticut, and Iowa.

In 2007, the state's House of Representatives rejected a measure which would have legalized assisted suicide for the terminally ill, by a vote of (82–63). With the governor's signature on May 20, 2013, Vermont became the fourth state to pass a "death with dignity" law — the first to be passed through legislation, rather than by ballot initiative.

Minor parties and independents flourish. Rules which eliminate smaller parties from the ballot in most states do not exist in Vermont. As a result, voters often have extensive choices for general elections. Among others, this more open policy enabled independents like Bernie Sanders to win election as mayor of Burlington, as a U.S. congressman, and as a U.S. senator.

A political issue has been Act 60, which balances taxation for education funding. This has resulted in the town of Killington trying to secede from Vermont and join New Hampshire, due to what the locals say is an unfair tax burden.

The Vermont constitution and the courts supports the right of a person to walk (fish and hunt) on any unposted, unfenced land. That is, trespass must be proven by the owner; it is not automatically assumed.

Vermont has some of the least restrictive gun control laws in the country. A permit or license is not required for purchasing or carrying firearms. Concealed carry and open carry of a firearm is legal over the age of 16, with those below 16 requiring parental permission.

Vermont has a pro-sanctuary city law.

The state is an alcoholic beverage control state. In 2007, through the Vermont Department of Liquor Control, it took in over $14 million from the sale and distribution of liquor.

In 2013, Vermont became the 17th state to decriminalize marijuana. The statute makes possession of less than an ounce of the drug punishable by a small fine, rather than arrest and possible jail time.

In 2014, Vermont became the first state to call for a constitutional convention to overturn the Supreme Court's decision in Citizens United v. FEC.

In 2014, Vermont became the first state to mandate labeling of genetically modified organisms in the retail food supply.

A distinctive law of Vermont is public nudity. The state's legislation calls for nudity in public to be a constitutional right of Vermonters, so long as "lewd and lascivious" acts are not performed in public view, and that the nudist does not undress in the presence of others. One reason this law was implemented is to protect skinny-dippers who frequent swimming holes, a long-time tradition in the state. There are other restrictions and bylaws on the municipal level concerning problematic nudity, but walking in the nude is legally protected in all 251 towns and cities in Vermont.

In January 2018, Governor Phil Scott opted to sign H.511, the Vermont marijuana legalization bill, which allows adults 21 and older to possess up to one ounce of marijuana and grow up to two mature plants starting July 1, 2018.

==== Federal politics ====
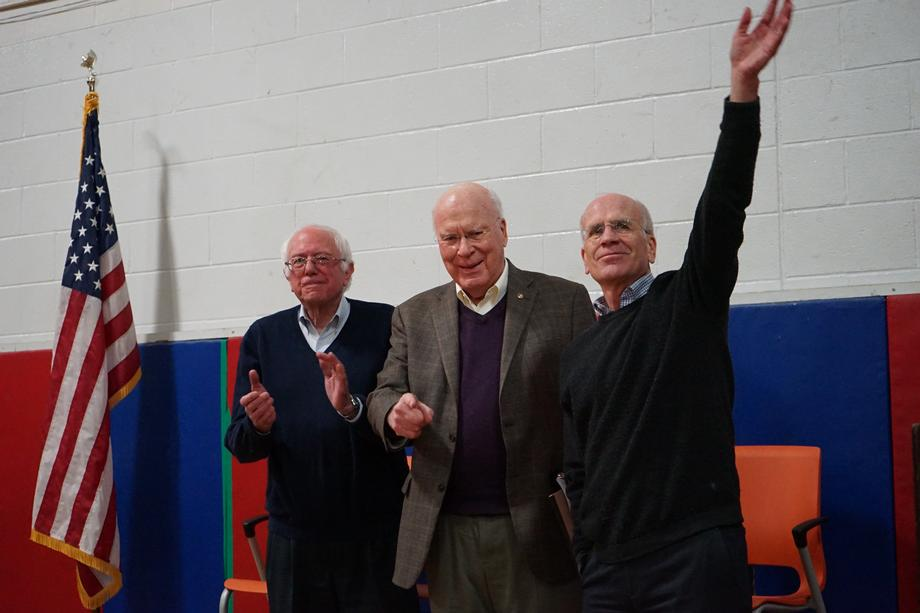
Senators Bernie Sanders and Patrick Leahy and Representative Peter Welch greet supporters in 2017.

Historically, Vermont was considered one of the most reliably Republican states in the country in terms of national elections. From 1856 to 1988, Vermont voted Democratic only once, in Lyndon B. Johnson's landslide victory of 1964 against Barry M. Goldwater. It was also one of only two states—Maine is the other—where Franklin D. Roosevelt was completely shut out in all four of his presidential bids. In the late 19th and early 20th centuries, Republican presidential candidates frequently won the state with over 70% of the vote.

In the 1960s and 1970s, many people moved in from out of state. Much of this immigration included the arrival of more liberal political influences of the urban areas of New York and the rest of New England in Vermont. The brand of Republicanism in Vermont has historically been a moderate one, and combined with the newcomers from out of state, this made Vermont friendlier to Democrats as the national GOP moved to the right. As evidence of this, in 1990 Bernie Sanders, a self-described democratic socialist, was elected to Vermont's lone seat in the House as an independent. Sanders became the state's junior Senator in 2007. However, for his entire career in the House and Senate, Sanders has caucused with the Democrats and is counted as a Democrat for the purposes of committee assignments and voting for party leadership.

After narrowly supporting George H. W. Bush in 1988, it gave Democrat Bill Clinton a 16-point margin in 1992—the first time the state had gone Democratic since 1964. Vermont has voted Democratic in every presidential election since.

Since 2004, Vermont has been one of the Democrats' most loyal states. It gave John Kerry his fourth-largest margin of victory in the presidential campaign against George W. Bush; he won the state's popular vote by 20 percentage points, taking almost 59% of the vote. (Kerry, from neighboring Massachusetts, also became the first Northern Democrat ever to carry Vermont; Johnson was from Texas, Clinton from Arkansas and Al Gore, triumphant in Vermont in 2000, from Tennessee.) Essex County in the state's northeastern section was the only county to vote for Bush. Vermont is the only state that did not receive a visit from George W. Bush during his tenure as President of the United States. Indeed, George W. Bush and Donald Trump are the only Republicans to win the White House without carrying Vermont. In 2008, Vermont gave Barack Obama his third-largest margin of victory (37 percentage points) and third-largest vote share in the nation by his winning the state 68% to 31%. Only Obama's birth state of Hawaii and Washington, D.C. were stronger Democratic victories. The same held true in 2012, when Obama carried Vermont 67% of the vote to 31% for Mitt Romney, and in 2016, when Hillary Clinton won with 57% of the vote to 30% for Donald Trump.

Vermont's two senators are independent Bernie Sanders and Democrat Peter Welch. The state is represented by an at-large member of the House, Democrat Becca Balint, who succeeded Welch in 2023.

== Culture ==
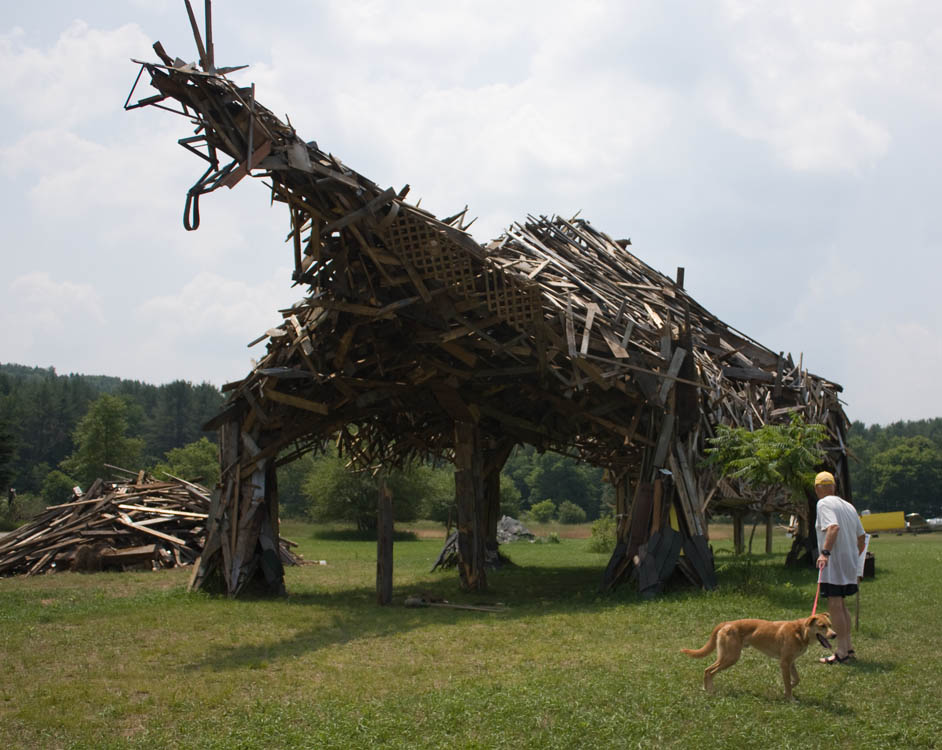
Vermontasaurus sculpture in Post Mills, in 2010

Vermont festivals include the Vermont Maple Festival, Festival on the Green, The Vermont Dairy Festival in Enosburg Falls, the Apple Festival (held each Columbus Day Weekend), the Marlboro Music Festival, the Guilford Country fair and the Vermont Brewers Festival. The Vermont Symphony Orchestra is supported by the state and performs throughout the area.

Since 1973 the Sage City Symphony, formed by composer Louis Calabro, has performed in the Bennington area. In 1988, a number of Vermont-based composers including Gwyneth Walker formed the Vermont Composers Consortium, which was recognized by the governor proclaiming 2011 as The Year of the Composer.

Burlington, Vermont's largest city, hosts the annual Vermont International Film Festival, which presents ten days in October of independent films. The Brattleboro-based Vermont Theatre Company presents an annual summer Shakespeare festival. Brattleboro also hosts the summertime Strolling of the Heifers parade which celebrates Vermont's dairy culture. The annual Green Mountain Film Festival is held in Montpelier.

In the Northeast Kingdom, the Bread and Puppet Theatre holds weekly shows in Glover in a natural outdoor amphitheater.

One of Vermont's best known musical acts is the rock band Phish, whose members met while attending school in Vermont and spent much of their early years playing at venues across the state.

The Vermont-based House of LeMay performs several shows a year, hosts the annual "Winter is a Drag Ball", and performs for fundraisers.

Examples of folk art found in Vermont include the Vermontasaurus in Post Mills, a community in Thetford.

The rate of volunteerism in Vermont was eighth in the nation with 37% in 2007. The state stood first in New England. In 2011, Vermont residents were ranked as the healthiest in the country.

== Sports ==
=== Winter sports ===
Winter sports are popular in New England, and Vermont's winter sports attractions are a big part of Vermont tourism. Some well known attractions include Burke Mountain ski area, Jay Peak Resort, Killington Ski Resort, Stowe Mountain Resort, the Quechee Club Ski Area, and Smugglers' Notch Resort.

Vermont natives in the snowboarding profession include Kevin Pearce, Ross Powers, Hannah Teter, and Kelly Clark. Others learned snowboarding in the state, such as Louie Vito and Ellery Hollingsworth.

Vermont Olympic gold medalists include Barbara Cochran, Hannah Kearney, Kelly Clark, Ross Powers, and Hannah Teter.

=== Baseball ===
The largest professional franchise is the Vermont Lake Monsters of the Futures Collegiate Baseball League, based in Burlington. They were named the Vermont Expos before 2006. Up until the 2011 season, they were the affiliate of the Washington Nationals (formerly the Montreal Expos). Up until 2020, they played in the New York-Penn League of Single-A and were the Single-A affiliate of the Oakland Athletics

=== Basketball ===
Currently the highest-ranked teams in basketball representing Vermont are the NCAA's Vermont Catamounts—male and female.

The Vermont Frost Heaves, the 2007 and 2008 American Basketball Association national champions, were a franchise of the Premier Basketball League, and were based in Barre and Burlington from the fall of 2006 through the winter of 2011.

=== Football ===
The Vermont Bucks, an indoor football team, were based in Burlington and began play in 2017 as the founding team in the Can-Am Indoor Football League. For 2018, the Bucks joined the American Arena League, but folded prior to playing in the new league. The University of Vermont abolished its intercollegiate football team, the Vermont Catamounts, in 1974.

=== Hockey ===
Vermont is home to the University of Vermont Men's and Women's hockey teams. Vermont's only professional hockey team was the Vermont Wild who played in the Federal Hockey League during the 2011–12 season, but the team folded before the season ended.

=== Soccer ===
The Vermont Voltage were a USL Premier Development League soccer club that played in St. Albans.

Vermont Green FC are a USL League 2 club that will play at University of Vermont's Virtue Field in Burlington.

In 2024, the University of Vermont Catamounts men's soccer team won the NCAA Division I National Championship, becoming the first UVM team sport to win a national championship as well as the first America East Conference team to win a national championship. They defeated Marshall 2–1 in overtime, finishing a Cinderella run in the tournament.

Annually since 2002, high school statewide all stars compete against New Hampshire in ten sports during "Twin State" playoffs.

=== Motorsport ===
Vermont also has a few auto racing venues. The most popular of them is Thunder Road International Speedbowl in Barre, Vermont. It is well known for its tight racing and has become well known in short track stock car racing. Other racing circuits include the USC sanctioned Bear Ridge Speedway, and the NASCAR sanctioned Devil's Bowl Speedway. Some NASCAR Cup drivers have come to Vermont circuits to compete against local weekly drivers such as Tony Stewart, Clint Bowyer, Kyle Busch, Kenny Wallace, Ken Schrader, and Christopher Bell. Kevin Lepage from Shelburne, Vermont is one of a few professional drivers from Vermont. Racing series in Vermont include NASCAR Whelen All-American Series, American Canadian Tour, and Vermont's own Tiger Sportsman Series.

=== Other ===
Rugby Union is represented at the collegiate level and adult club level with 5 men's sides and 1 women's side. All compete in the NERFU conference and some have won national championships.

== Residents ==
=== In fiction ===
- Vermont was also the home of Dick Loudon, Bob Newhart's character on the 1980s sitcom Newhart. All action supposedly took place in Vermont.
- Vermont was the home of Pollyanna and her Aunt Polly in the novel Pollyanna, later made into the 1960 Disney film starring Hayley Mills and Jane Wyman.
- In H. P. Lovecraft's The Whisperer in Darkness, Vermont is the home of folklorist Henry Akeley (and the uninhabited hills of Vermont serve as one of the earth bases of the extraterrestrial Mi-Go).
- Donna Tartt's novel The Secret History is a story set mostly in a fictitious town of Hampden, Vermont, and college of the same name, where several students conspire to murder a classmate.
- Sinclair Lewis' 1935 anti-fascist novel It Can't Happen Here is largely set in Vermont, as local newspaper editor Doremus Jessup opposes a newly elected dictatorial government.
- Annie Baker's Circle Mirror Transformation, Body Awareness, and The Aliens all take place in the fictional town of Shirley, Vermont.

== See also ==
- Outline of Vermont
- Index of Vermont-related articles
- French language in the United States

== Bibliography ==
=== Sources ===
- Albers, Jan (2000), Hands on the Land: A History of the Vermont Landscape, MIT Press, ISBN 978-0-262-01175-4.
- Allen, Ira (1969) [1798]. The natural and political history of the State of Vermont, one of the United States of America. Charles E Tuttle Co. ISBN 978-0-8048-0419-6.
- Bryan, Frank; McClaughry, John (1989), The Vermont Papers: Recreating Democracy on a Human Scale, Chelsea Green, ISBN 978-0-930031-19-0.
- Burlington (city) QuickFacts, US: Census Bureau, October 18, 2011, archived from the original on March 27, 2012.
- Cohen, David Elliot; Smolan, Rick (2004), Vermont 24/7, DK, ISBN 978-0-7566-0086-0.
- Coffin, Howard (1995), Full Duty: Vermonters in the Civil War, The Countryman, ISBN 978-0-88150-349-4.
- Doyle, William T (1987), The Vermont Political Tradition and Those Who Helped Make It, Doyle, ISBN 978-0-9615486-1-2.
- Duffy, John J (2000), Vermont: An Illustrated History, American Historical Press, ISBN 978-1-892724-08-3.
- Duffy, John J.; Hand, Samuel B.; Orth, Ralph H., eds. (2003), The Vermont Encyclopedia, Lebanon, New Hampshire: University Press of New England, ISBN 978-1-58465-086-7.
- "Vermont: A guide to the Green Mountain State", Federal Writers' Project of the Works Progress Administration for the State of Vermont, Houghton Mifflin, 1937.
- Grant, Kim; et al. (2002), Vermont: An Explorer's Guide, The Countryman, ISBN 978-0-88150-519-1.
- Klyza, Christopher McGrory; Trombulak, Stephen C (1999), The Story of Vermont: A Natural and Cultural History, University Press of New England, ISBN 978-0-87451-936-5.
- Potash, P Jeffrey; et al. (2004), Freedom and Unity: A History of Vermont, Vermont Historical Society, ISBN 978-0-934720-49-6.
- Hall, Benjamin Homer (1858), History of eastern Vermont, p. 480.
- Meeks, Harold A (1968), Vermont's Land and Resources, The New England Press, ISBN 978-0-933050-40-2.
- Rodgers, Stephen 'Steve' (1998), Country Towns of Vermont, McGraw-Hill, ISBN 978-1-56626-195-1.
- Sherman, Joseph 'Joe' (2000), Fast Lane on a Dirt Road: A Contemporary History of Vermont, Chelsea Green, ISBN 978-1-890132-74-3.
- Sletcher, Michael (2004), New England, Westport, CT.
- Vermont Atlas & Gazetteer, DeLorme, 2000, ISBN 978-0-89933-322-9.
- Van de Water, Frederic Franklyn (1974). The Reluctant Republic: Vermont 1724–1791. The Countryman Press. ISBN 978-0-914378-02-0.

Preceded by Rhode Island	List of U.S. states by date of admission to the Union; Admitted on March 4, 1791 (14th)	Succeeded by Kentucky
