= Outline of Vermont =

Overview of and topical guide to Vermont

The flag of Vermont

The seal of Vermont

The location of the state of Vermont in the United States of America

Vermont The following outline is provided as an overview of and topical guide to the U.S. state of Vermont:

Vermont – state in the New England region of the northeastern United States. Vermont is the leading producer of maple syrup in the United States. The state capital is Montpelier with a population of 7,855, making it the least populous state capital in the country.

== General reference ==
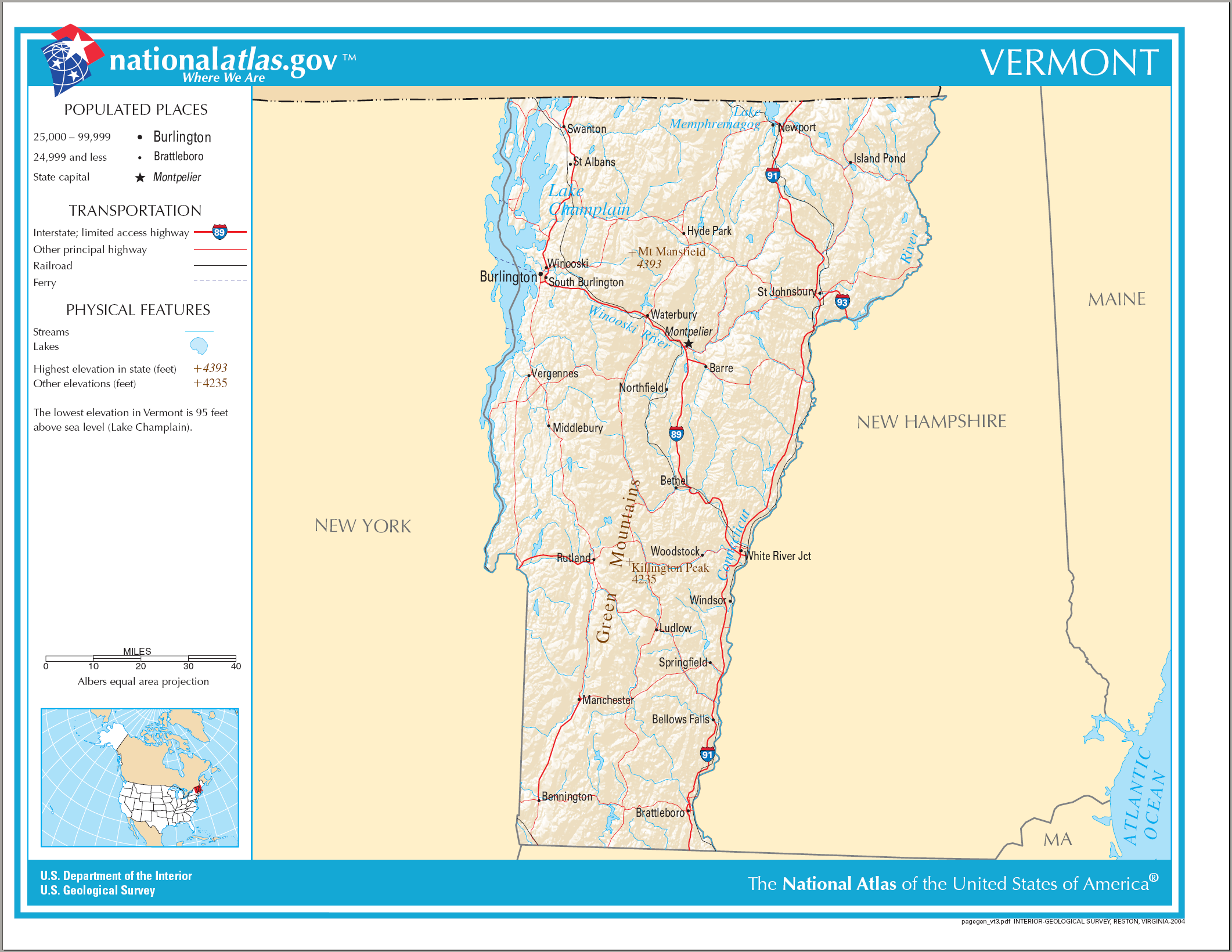
An enlargeable map of the state of Vermont

- Names
  - Common name: Vermont
    - Pronunciation: /vərˈmɒnt/
  - Official name: State of Vermont
  - Abbreviations and name codes
    - Postal symbol: VT
    - ISO 3166-2 code: US-VT
    - Internet second-level domain: .vt.us
  - Nicknames
    - Green Mountain State (currently used on license plates)
- Adjectival: Vermont
- Demonym: Vermonter

== Geography of Vermont ==
Geography of Vermont

- Vermont is: a U.S. state, a federal state of the United States of America
- Location
  - Northern Hemisphere
  - Western Hemisphere
    - Americas
      - North America
        - Anglo America
        - Northern America
          - United States of America
            - Contiguous United States
              - Canada–US border
              - Eastern United States
                - East Coast of the United States – though Vermont does not include any actual coastline, it is generally considered to be part of the Eastern Seaboard region.
                  - Northeastern United States
                    - New England
- Population of Vermont: 625,741 (2010 U.S. Census)
- Area of Vermont: 9,623 sq mi (24,923 km^{2})
- Atlas of Vermont

=== Places in Vermont ===
- Historic places in Vermont
  - National Historic Landmarks in Vermont
  - National Register of Historic Places listings in Vermont
    - Bridges on the National Register of Historic Places in Vermont
- National Natural Landmarks in Vermont
- Marsh-Billings-Rockefeller National Historical Park
- State parks in Vermont
- List of tallest buildings in Vermont

=== Environment of Vermont ===
- Climate of Vermont
  - Climate change in Vermont
- Protected areas in Vermont
  - State forests of Vermont
- Superfund sites in Vermont
- Wildlife of Vermont
  - Fauna of Vermont
    - Birds of Vermont
- Earth Peoples Park

==== Natural geographic features of Vermont ====
- Lakes of Vermont
- Mountains of Vermont
- Rivers of Vermont

=== Regions of Vermont ===
- Central Vermont
- Northeast Kingdom

==== Administrative divisions of Vermont ====
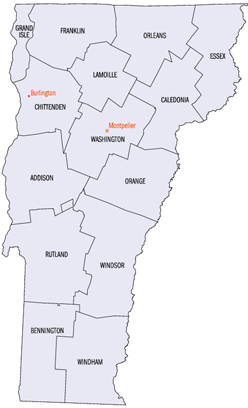
An enlargeable map of the 14 counties of the state of Vermont

- The 14 counties of the state of Vermont
  - Municipalities in Vermont
    - Cities in Vermont
      - State capital of Vermont:
      - City nicknames in Vermont
    - Towns in Vermont
    - Village (Vermont)
- Gore (surveying)

=== Demography of Vermont ===
Demographics of Vermont

== Government and politics of Vermont ==
Politics of Vermont

- Form of government: U.S. state government
- Vermont's congressional delegations
- Vermont State Capitol
- Elections in Vermont
  - Electoral reform in Vermont
- Political party strength in Vermont

=== Branches of the government of Vermont ===
Government of Vermont

==== Executive branch of the government of Vermont ====
- Governor of Vermont
  - Lieutenant Governor of Vermont
  - Secretary of State of Vermont
- State departments
  - Vermont Department of Transportation

==== Legislative branch of the government of Vermont ====
- Vermont General Assembly (bicameral)
  - Upper house: Vermont Senate
  - Lower house: Vermont House of Representatives

==== Judicial branch of the government of Vermont ====
Courts of Vermont

- Supreme Court of Vermont

=== Law and order in Vermont ===
Law of Vermont

- Cannabis in Vermont
- Capital punishment in Vermont
- Constitution of Vermont
- Crime in Vermont
- Gun laws in Vermont
- Law enforcement in Vermont
  - Law enforcement agencies in Vermont
    - Vermont State Police
- Same-sex marriage in Vermont

=== Military in Vermont ===
- Vermont Air National Guard
- Vermont Army National Guard

== History of Vermont ==
History of Vermont

=== History of Vermont, by period ===
- Prehistory of Vermont
- French colony of Canada, 1534–(1609–1763)
- King George's War, 1740–1748
  - Treaty of Aix-la-Chapelle of 1748
- French and Indian War, 1754–1763
  - Treaty of Paris of 1763
  - Royal Proclamation of 1763
- British Province of New-Hampshire, 1707–(1763–1776)
- British Province of New-York, 1707–(1763–1776)
- British Indian Reserve, 1763–1783
- Republic of New Connecticut, 1777
- Vermont Republic, 1777–1791
- Slavery in Vermont
- Vermont becomes the 14th state, admitted to the United States of America on March 4, 1791
  - American Civil War, April 12, 1861 – May 13, 1865
    - Vermont in the American Civil War
  - Chester A. Arthur becomes 21st President of the United States on September 19, 1881
  - Spanish–American War, April 25 – August 12, 1898
  - World War I, June 28, 1914 – November 11, 1918
    - United States enters Great War on April 6, 1917
  - Calvin Coolidge becomes 30th President of the United States on August 2, 1923

=== History of Vermont, by subject ===
- List of Vermont state legislatures

== Culture of Vermont ==
Culture of Vermont

- Cuisine of Vermont
- Museums in Vermont
- Religion in Vermont
  - Episcopal Diocese of Vermont
- Scouting in Vermont
- Witch window
- State symbols of Vermont
  - Flag of Vermont
  - Seal of Vermont

=== Arts in Vermont ===
- Music of Vermont

=== Sports in Vermont ===
- Sports in Vermont

== Economy and infrastructure of Vermont ==
Economy of Vermont

- Communications in Vermont
  - Newspapers in Vermont
  - Radio stations in Vermont
  - Television stations in Vermont
- Energy in Vermont
  - Power stations in Vermont
  - Solar power in Vermont
  - Wind power in Vermont
- Health care in Vermont
  - Hospitals in Vermont
- Transportation in Vermont
  - Airports in Vermont
  - Roads in Vermont
    - State highways in Vermont

== Education in Vermont ==
Education in Vermont

- Schools in Vermont
  - School districts in Vermont
    - High schools in Vermont
  - Colleges and universities in Vermont
    - University of Vermont

== See also ==
- Topic overview:
  - Vermont
  - Index of Vermont-related articles
