= Geography of Vermont =

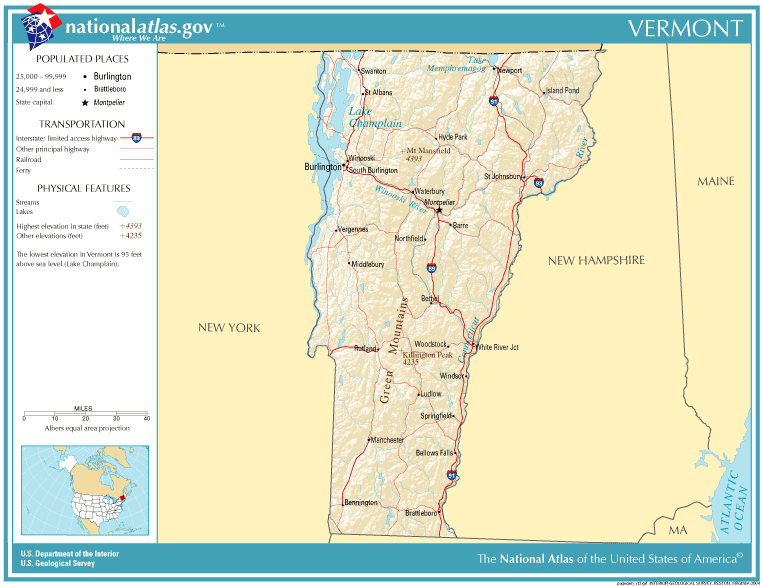
Map of Vermont showing cities, roads, and rivers

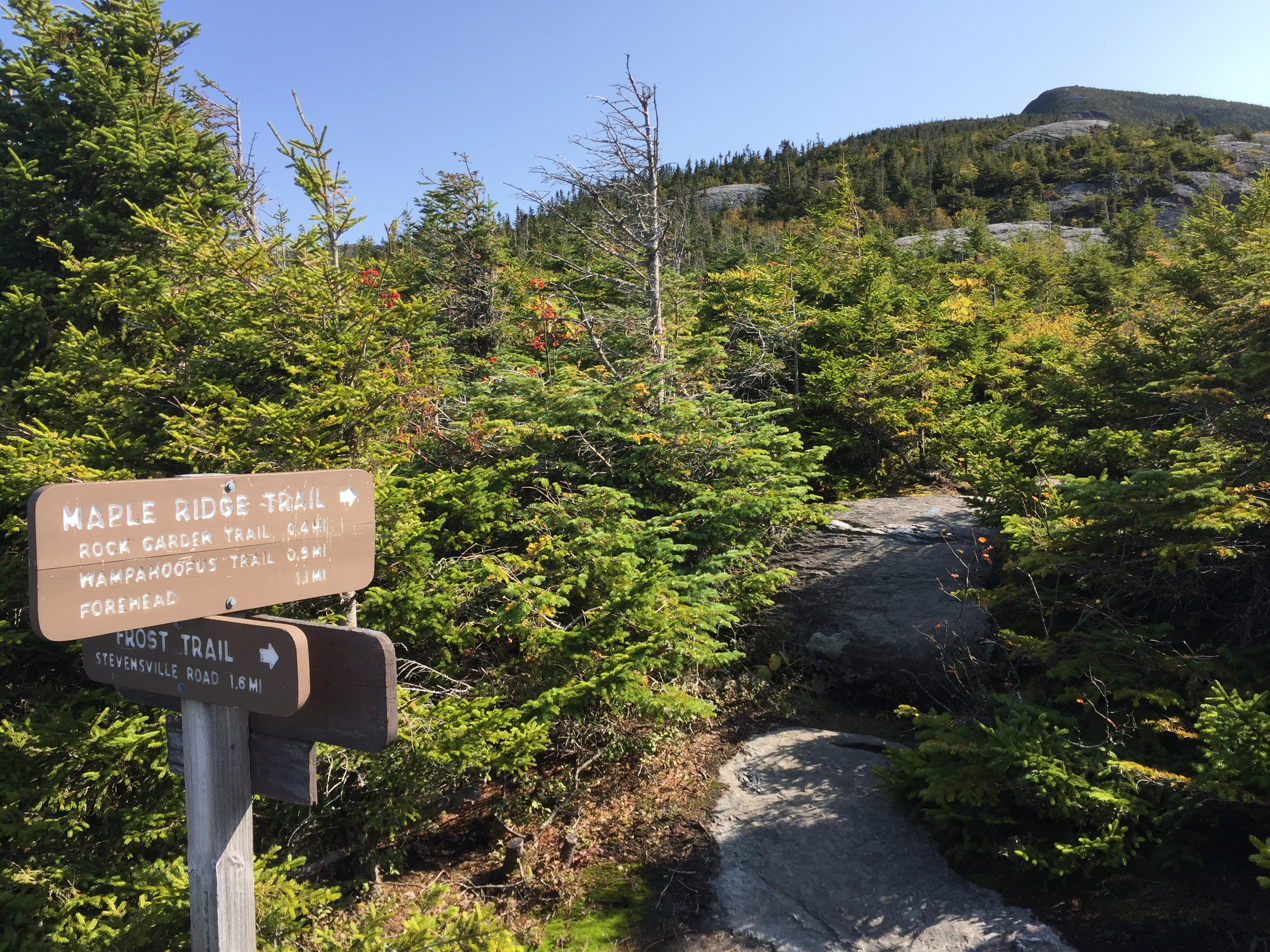
Mount Mansfield

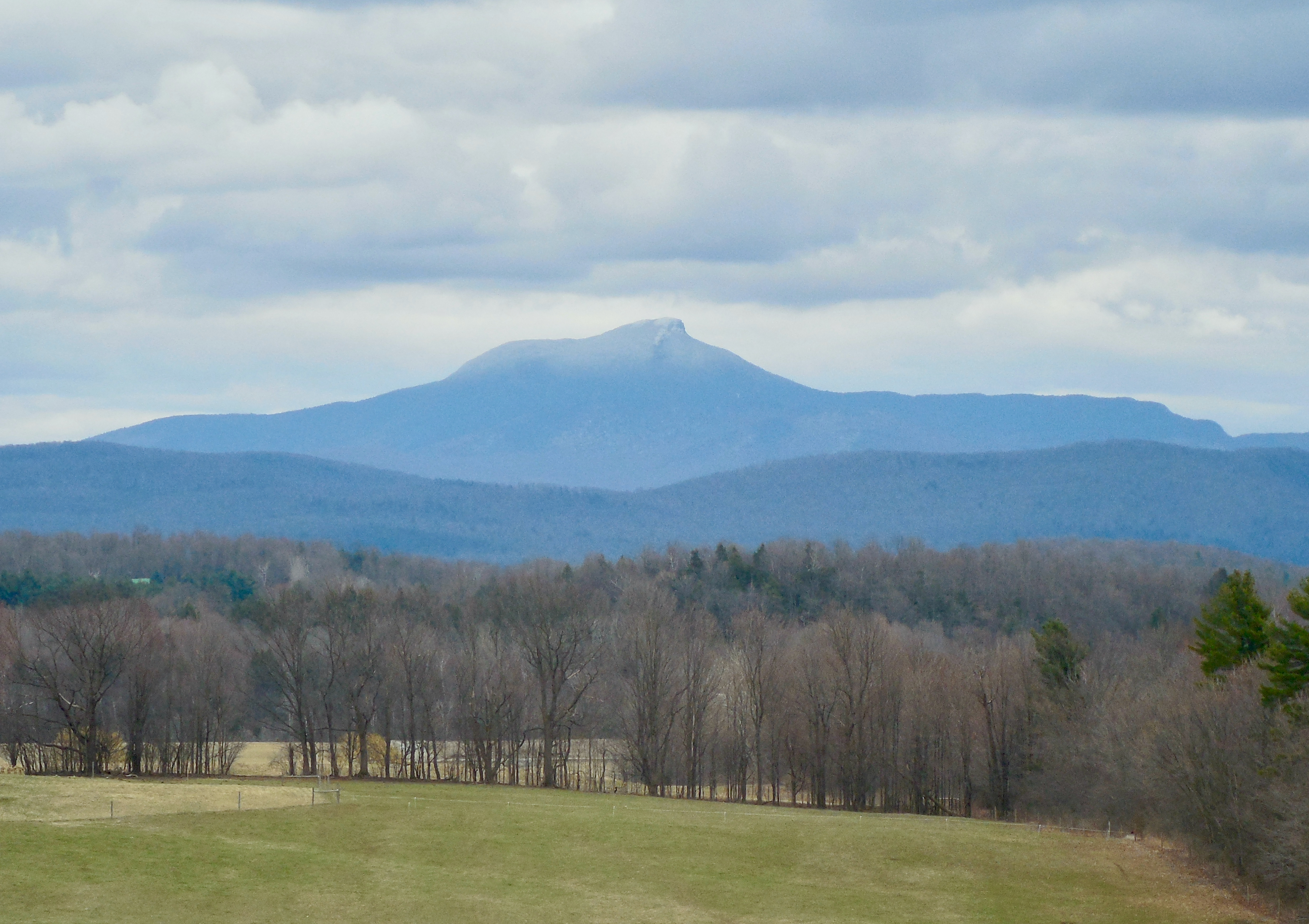
Western face of Camel's Hump Mountain (elevation 4,079 feet (1,243 m)).

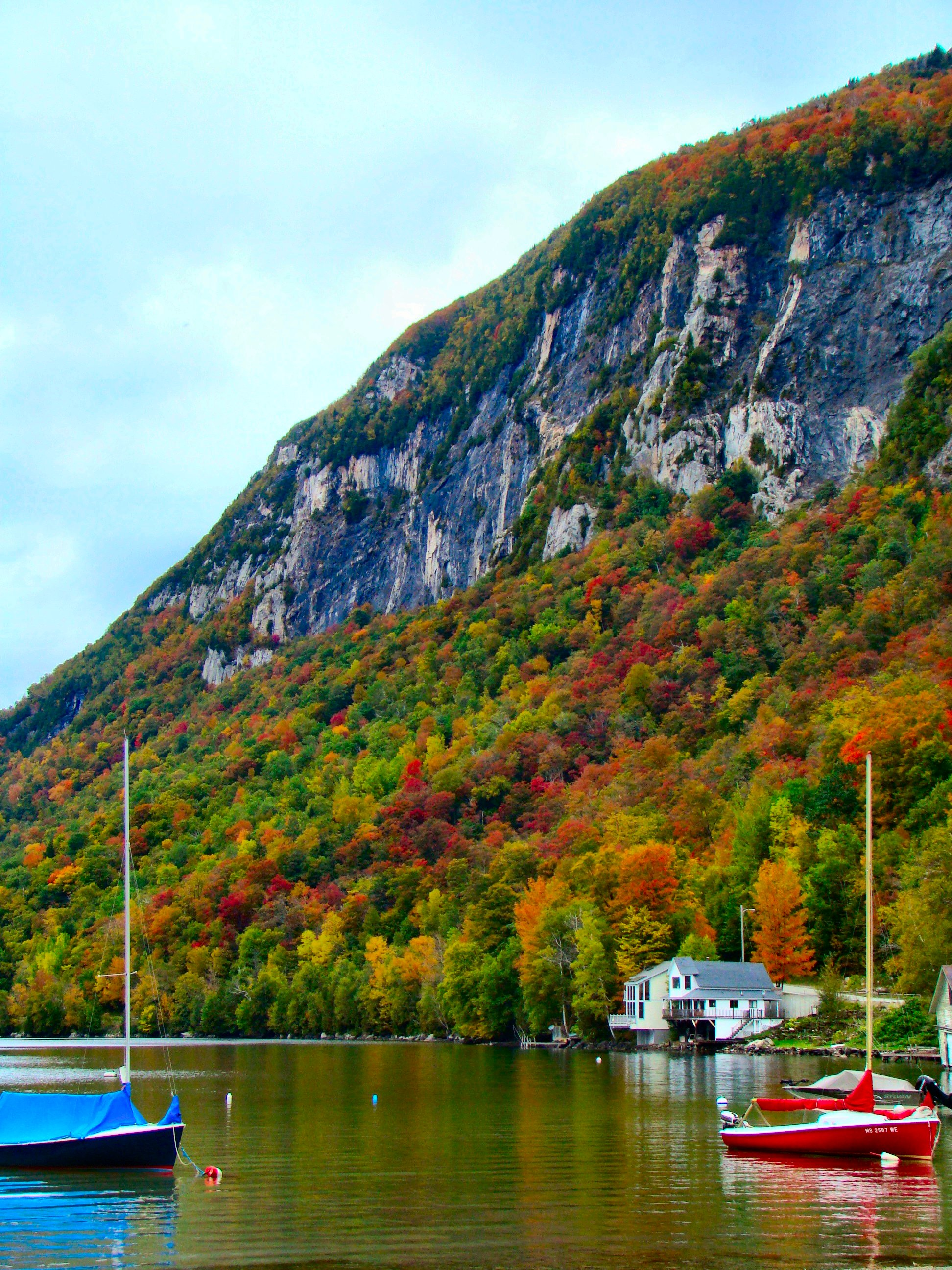
Fall foliage at Lake Willoughby

The U.S. state of Vermont is located in the New England region of the northeastern United States and comprises 9,614 square miles (24,900 km^{2}), making it the 45th-largest state. Land comprises 9,250 square miles (24,000 km^{2}) and water comprises 365 square miles (950 km^{2}), making it the 43rd-largest in land area and the 47th in water area. In total area, it is larger than El Salvador and smaller than Haiti. It is the only landlocked state in New England, and it is the easternmost and the smallest in area of all landlocked states.

Vermont's overall geography can be best characterized as extremely rugged and densely forested, with outposts of civilization centered around rivers and the (relatively) flat and arable Champlain Valley in the northwest, and ultimately divided by the Green Mountains, which contribute to a rural and very much Appalachian landscape. The average elevation of Vermont is 1000 feet above sea level, and the highest elevation is the summit of Mount Mansfield at 4,395 feet above sea level.

The Green Mountains in Vermont form a north–south spine running most of the length of the state, slightly west of its center. In the southwest portion of the state are located the Taconic Mountains. In the northwest, near Lake Champlain, is the fertile Champlain Valley. In the south of the valley is Lake Bomoseen. Many towns and villages in Vermont are separated by (comparatively) lower hills and mountains, connected by rural highways and high passes referred to variously as notches, gaps or gulfs. The endless rugged terrain contributes heavily to Vermont's rural character and acts as a natural barrier to large scale population growth. Indeed, 66% of all mileage of road in Vermont is "paved" with dirt or gravel, and annually results in springtime's mud season, where runoff snowmelt causes dirt backroads to become nearly impassable to motor vehicles, often to the amusement of locals.

Vermont's extremely rugged terrain is the almost certain explanation for why the state has remained so sparsely populated; After Maine, Vermont has the lowest population density of any state east of the Mississippi River. Burlington, at only ~45,000 people is the largest city, and is situated in the (relatively) flat and populated Champlain Valley.

Lake Champlain, the sixth-largest body of fresh water in the United States, separates Vermont from New York in the northwest portion of the state. From north to south, Vermont is 159 miles (256 km) long. Its greatest width, from east to west, is 89 miles (143 km) at the Canada–U.S. border; the narrowest width is 37 miles (60 km) near the Massachusetts border. The width averages 60.5 miles (97.4 km). The state's geographic center is approximately three miles (5 km) east of Roxbury, in Washington County. There are fifteen U.S. federal border crossings between Vermont and Canada.

Several mountains have timberlines with delicate year-round alpine ecosystems, including Mount Mansfield, the highest mountain in the state; Killington Peak, the second-highest; Camel's Hump, the state's third-highest; and Mount Abraham, the fifth-highest peak. Areas in Vermont administered by the National Park Service include the Marsh-Billings-Rockefeller National Historical Park (in Woodstock) and the Appalachian National Scenic Trail.

== Borders ==
On July 20, 1764, King George III signed an Order in Council establishing, among other things, two boundaries of the Province of New York which have been inherited by Vermont. The eastern border was set at the mean low water mark of the west bank of the Connecticut River, meaning most of the water in the river is in New Hampshire. 41% of Vermont's land area is part of the Connecticut River's watershed.

George set the northern boundary with the Province of Quebec at the 45th parallel north, from the Connecticut River to the St. Lawrence River. The Collins–Valentine line was surveyed along this parallel from 1771 to 1773. It was later discovered to deviate northward from the intended location by over a thousand feet in places. The 1842 Webster–Ashburton Treaty affirmed the legal boundary is where the Collins–Valentine markers are, not the exact 45th parallel, leaving Vermont with a small amount of additional territory.

The state's western boundary is Lake Champlain, the Poultney River, and continuation of a buffer approximately 20 miles east of the Hudson River (as was done for Connecticut and Massachusetts).

The modern northern boundary of Massachusetts was set in 1740 by King George II to resolve a dispute between Massachusetts and New Hampshire that arose after the Merrimack River was discovered to extend much further north than previously understood.

== Settlements ==
=== Cities ===
Vermont has ten incorporated cities.

City populations (2020 census)
City	Population
Burlington	44,743
South Burlington	20,292
Rutland	15,807
Essex Junction	10,761
Barre	8,491
Montpelier	8,074
Winooski	7,997
St. Albans	6,877
Newport	4,455
Vergennes	2,553

The most populous city in Vermont is Burlington. Its metropolitan area is also the most populous in the state, with an estimate of 225,562 as of 2020. Vermont is the second least densely populated state east of the Mississippi after Maine, with around 68 people per square mile.

=== Largest towns ===
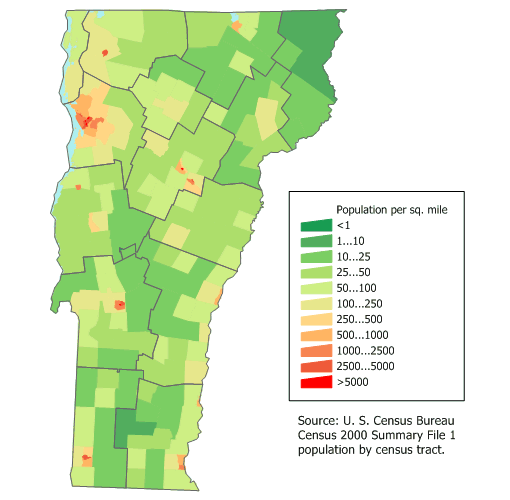
Population density of Vermont

Although these towns are large enough to be considered cities, they are not incorporated as such.

Large town populations (2020 census)
Town	Population
Essex	22,094
Colchester	17,524
Bennington	15,333
Brattleboro	12,184
Milton	10,723
Hartford	10,686
Williston	10,103
Middlebury	9,152
Springfield	9,062
Barre	7,923
Shelburne	7,717
St. Johnsbury	7,364

== Climate ==
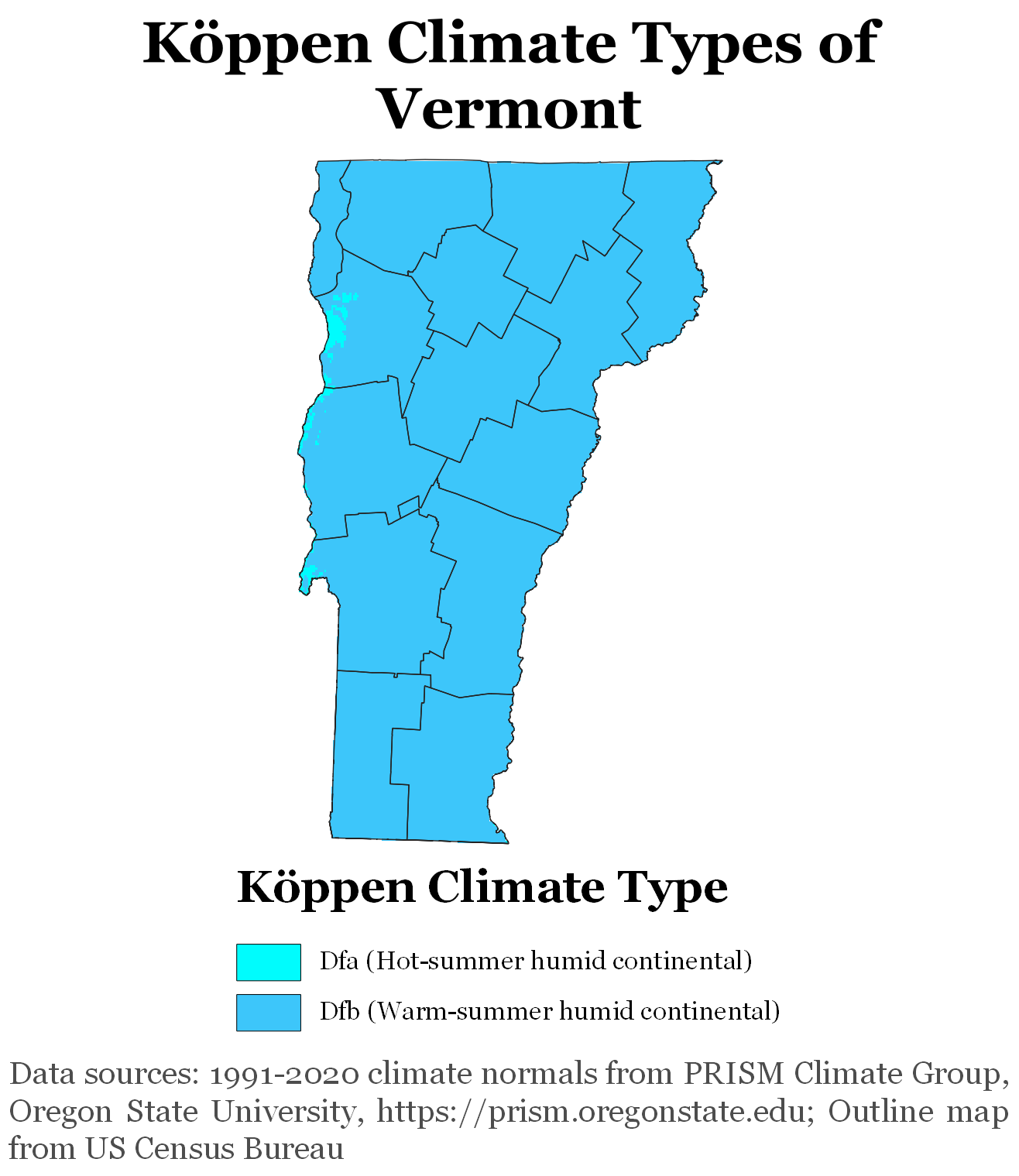
Köppen climate types of Vermont, using 1991–2020 climate normals.

The annual mean temperature for the state is 43 °F (6 °C). Vermont has a humid continental climate, with muddy springs, in general a mild early summer, hot Augusts; it has colorful autumns: Vermont's hills reveal red, orange, and (on sugar maples) gold foliage as cold weather approaches. Winters are colder at higher elevations. It has a Köppen climate classification of Dfb, a temperate continental climate. The absolute highest peaks of the Green Mountains that compose arctic tundra are subarctic.

The rural northeastern section known as the "Northeast Kingdom" often averages 10 °F (5.6 °C) colder than the southern areas of the state during winter. The annual snowfall averages between 60 and 100 inches (1,500 and 2,500 mm) depending on elevation. Vermont is the seventh coldest state in the country. Lake Champlain sometimes causes lake-effect snow during the winter.

The highest recorded temperature was 105 °F (41 °C), at Vernon, on July 4, 1911. The lowest recorded temperature was −50 °F (−46 °C), at Bloomfield, on December 30, 1933; this is the lowest temperature recorded in New England alongside Big Black River, which recorded a verified −50 °F (−46 °C) in 2009. The agricultural growing season ranges from 120 to 180 days. The United States Department of Agriculture plant hardiness zones for the state range between zone 3b, no colder than −35 °F (−37 °C), in the Northeast Kingdom and northern part of the state and zone 5b, no colder than −15 °F (−26 °C), in the southern part of the state. The state receives between 2,200 and 2,400 hours of sunshine annually. New England as a whole receives a range of less than 2,000 hours of sunshine in part of New Hampshire to as much as 2,600 hours of sunshine per year in Connecticut and Rhode Island.

=== Climate change ===
Climate change in Vermont encompasses the effects of climate change, attributed to man-made increases in atmospheric carbon dioxide, in the U.S. state of Vermont.

The state is already seeing effects of climate change that affect its ecosystems, economy and public health. According to the Vermont state government, rainfall has significantly increased in the last 50 years, storms and flooding have increased, and winters have become warmer and shorter. These changes have led to significant impacts on both the winter tourism industry, and a decline in critical agricultural and woodland industries like maple sugaring. Vermont is extremely susceptible to flooding from hurricanes and heavy rainfall due to its mountainous terrain and river valleys where most of the residents live. The state has had multiple devastating floods in recent years, including a major flood on July 10, 2023 and another major flood on the same day a year later, on July 10, 2024. Climate change is expected to increase flooding risks across the state and nation, and Vermonters are working to build communities which are more resilient and prepared for the future.

The state openly acknowledges and is developing programs that respond to global warming. Vermont was one of the first states in the United States to adopt greenhouse gas emissions goals in 2006.

=== Flooding ===
The topography and climate make sections of Vermont subject to large-scale flooding. Incidents include the Great Vermont Flood of 1927, which killed 84 and damaged much of the state's infrastructure, the flood of 1973, which covered many of the state's roads in the southeast, and Tropical Storm Irene in 2011, which caused substantial damage throughout the state. In response to the 1927 flood, the Federal government funded construction of six flood control dams in the state, run by the Army Corps of Engineers. These extreme rain and flooding events are expected to get worse with climate change.

=== Climate data ===
Climate data for Patrick Leahy Burlington International Airport, Vermont (1991–2020 normals, (Note: Mean monthly maxima and minima (i.e. the expected highest and lowest temperature readings at any point during the year or given month) calculated based on data at said location from 1991 to 2020.) extremes 1883–present (Note: Official records for Burlington were kept at downtown from December 1883 to 3 June 1943, and at Burlington Int'l since 4 June 1943. For more information, see ThreadEx.))
Month	Jan	Feb	Mar	Apr	May	Jun	Jul	Aug	Sep	Oct	Nov	Dec	Year
Record high °F (°C)	66 (19)	72 (22)	84 (29)	91 (33)	95 (35)	100 (38)	100 (38)	101 (38)	98 (37)	86 (30)	76 (24)	68 (20)	101 (38)
Mean maximum °F (°C)	51.7 (10.9)	50.6 (10.3)	62.0 (16.7)	78.0 (25.6)	86.5 (30.3)	91.4 (33.0)	92.2 (33.4)	90.9 (32.7)	87.0 (30.6)	76.0 (24.4)	66.2 (19.0)	54.2 (12.3)	94.4 (34.7)
Mean daily maximum °F (°C)	28.9 (−1.7)	31.5 (−0.3)	40.9 (4.9)	55.3 (12.9)	69.0 (20.6)	77.6 (25.3)	82.4 (28.0)	80.7 (27.1)	72.6 (22.6)	58.9 (14.9)	46.4 (8.0)	35.0 (1.7)	56.6 (13.7)
Daily mean °F (°C)	20.9 (−6.2)	22.9 (−5.1)	32.3 (0.2)	45.6 (7.6)	58.4 (14.7)	67.5 (19.7)	72.4 (22.4)	70.7 (21.5)	62.7 (17.1)	50.3 (10.2)	39.3 (4.1)	28.2 (−2.1)	47.6 (8.7)
Mean daily minimum °F (°C)	12.9 (−10.6)	14.3 (−9.8)	23.6 (−4.7)	35.9 (2.2)	47.8 (8.8)	57.3 (14.1)	62.4 (16.9)	60.7 (15.9)	52.9 (11.6)	41.8 (5.4)	32.1 (0.1)	21.3 (−5.9)	38.6 (3.7)
Mean minimum °F (°C)	−12.7 (−24.8)	−7.8 (−22.1)	0.0 (−17.8)	21.2 (−6.0)	32.2 (0.1)	42.3 (5.7)	50.4 (10.2)	47.4 (8.6)	36.2 (2.3)	26.3 (−3.2)	13.7 (−10.2)	−1.6 (−18.7)	−15.3 (−26.3)
Record low °F (°C)	−30 (−34)	−30 (−34)	−24 (−31)	2 (−17)	24 (−4)	33 (1)	39 (4)	35 (2)	25 (−4)	15 (−9)	−3 (−19)	−29 (−34)	−30 (−34)
Average precipitation inches (mm)	2.13 (54)	1.77 (45)	2.24 (57)	3.07 (78)	3.76 (96)	4.26 (108)	4.06 (103)	3.54 (90)	3.67 (93)	3.83 (97)	2.70 (69)	2.50 (64)	37.53 (953)
Average snowfall inches (cm)	21.1 (54)	19.3 (49)	17.5 (44)	4.1 (10)	0.0 (0.0)	0.0 (0.0)	0.0 (0.0)	0.0 (0.0)	0.0 (0.0)	0.3 (0.76)	5.7 (14)	19.5 (50)	87.5 (222)
Average extreme snow depth inches (cm)	11.1 (28)	12.0 (30)	11.4 (29)	2.6 (6.6)	0.0 (0.0)	0.0 (0.0)	0.0 (0.0)	0.0 (0.0)	0.0 (0.0)	0.2 (0.51)	2.7 (6.9)	7.7 (20)	17.2 (44)
Average precipitation days (≥ 0.01 in)	14.7	12.1	12.7	13.2	13.6	13.6	12.8	11.7	11.0	12.9	13.7	15.2	157.2
Average snowy days (≥ 0.1 in)	14.3	12.1	8.7	2.9	0.1	0.0	0.0	0.0	0.0	0.4	4.6	11.6	54.7
Mean monthly sunshine hours	126.9	146.8	190.7	206.2	251.4	270.1	301.9	258.2	201.0	159.2	91.1	91.6	2,295.1
Percentage possible sunshine	44	50	52	51	55	58	64	59	53	47	32	33	51
Average ultraviolet index	1	2	3	5	7	8	8	7	5	3	2	1	4
Source 1: NOAA (sun 1961–1990)
Source 2: Weather Atlas (UV)

Climate data for Montpelier, VT (Edward F. Knapp State Airport) 1991–2020 normals, extremes 1948–present)
Month	Jan	Feb	Mar	Apr	May	Jun	Jul	Aug	Sep	Oct	Nov	Dec	Year
Record high °F (°C)	66 (19)	70 (21)	82 (28)	90 (32)	91 (33)	95 (35)	97 (36)	97 (36)	92 (33)	85 (29)	76 (24)	67 (19)	97 (36)
Mean maximum °F (°C)	50.3 (10.2)	50.0 (10.0)	59.8 (15.4)	75.6 (24.2)	83.8 (28.8)	87.9 (31.1)	88.4 (31.3)	87.0 (30.6)	83.7 (28.7)	74.5 (23.6)	65.0 (18.3)	51.9 (11.1)	90.2 (32.3)
Mean daily maximum °F (°C)	25.8 (−3.4)	28.9 (−1.7)	37.6 (3.1)	51.5 (10.8)	65.0 (18.3)	73.2 (22.9)	77.6 (25.3)	76.1 (24.5)	68.6 (20.3)	55.3 (12.9)	42.8 (6.0)	31.3 (−0.4)	52.8 (11.6)
Daily mean °F (°C)	16.6 (−8.6)	18.9 (−7.3)	27.9 (−2.3)	40.9 (4.9)	53.3 (11.8)	61.8 (16.6)	66.5 (19.2)	64.9 (18.3)	57.4 (14.1)	45.5 (7.5)	34.4 (1.3)	23.2 (−4.9)	42.6 (5.9)
Mean daily minimum °F (°C)	7.4 (−13.7)	8.9 (−12.8)	18.1 (−7.7)	30.3 (−0.9)	41.7 (5.4)	50.5 (10.3)	55.5 (13.1)	53.7 (12.1)	46.3 (7.9)	35.7 (2.1)	26.0 (−3.3)	15.1 (−9.4)	32.4 (0.2)
Mean minimum °F (°C)	−16.7 (−27.1)	−12.0 (−24.4)	−4.3 (−20.2)	17.0 (−8.3)	28.5 (−1.9)	37.8 (3.2)	45.1 (7.3)	43.1 (6.2)	32.3 (0.2)	22.6 (−5.2)	9.1 (−12.7)	−6.9 (−21.6)	−19.2 (−28.4)
Record low °F (°C)	−34 (−37)	−29 (−34)	−18 (−28)	2 (−17)	20 (−7)	29 (−2)	35 (2)	31 (−1)	20 (−7)	14 (−10)	−7 (−22)	−27 (−33)	−34 (−37)
Average precipitation inches (mm)	2.32 (59)	2.06 (52)	2.49 (63)	3.04 (77)	3.52 (89)	4.21 (107)	4.27 (108)	3.81 (97)	3.33 (85)	3.87 (98)	2.85 (72)	2.93 (74)	38.70 (983)
Average snowfall inches (cm)	22.6 (57)	18.0 (46)	16.8 (43)	4.9 (12)	0.0 (0.0)	0.0 (0.0)	0.0 (0.0)	0.0 (0.0)	0.0 (0.0)	0.9 (2.3)	9.1 (23)	21.9 (56)	94.2 (239)
Average precipitation days (≥ 0.01 in)	13.6	13.2	12.7	13.5	13.9	14.4	14.0	12.6	10.9	13.9	13.9	15.4	162.0
Average snowy days (≥ 0.1 in)	12.0	9.1	7.5	3.3	0.0	0.0	0.0	0.0	0.0	0.9	5.7	11.7	50.2
Average ultraviolet index	1	2	3	5	7	8	8	7	5	3	2	1	4
Source 1: NOAA (snow 1981–2010)
Source 2: Weather Atlas

Climate data for Island Pond, Vermont
Month	Jan	Feb	Mar	Apr	May	Jun	Jul	Aug	Sep	Oct	Nov	Dec	Year
Record high °F (°C)	58.7 (14.8)	63.2 (17.3)	75.7 (24.3)	83.5 (28.6)	85.9 (29.9)	90.7 (32.6)	91.0 (32.8)	89.6 (32.0)	89.3 (31.8)	76.8 (24.9)	66.9 (19.4)	59.8 (15.4)	91.0 (32.8)
Mean daily maximum °F (°C)	23.0 (−5.0)	27.4 (−2.6)	36.4 (2.4)	50.5 (10.3)	63.7 (17.6)	72.3 (22.4)	76.3 (24.6)	74.8 (23.8)	66.7 (19.3)	54.0 (12.2)	41.0 (5.0)	29.0 (−1.7)	51.4 (10.8)
Daily mean °F (°C)	12.1 (−11.1)	15.1 (−9.4)	25.1 (−3.8)	39.3 (4.1)	51.3 (10.7)	60.5 (15.8)	64.8 (18.2)	63.4 (17.4)	55.3 (12.9)	43.7 (6.5)	33.0 (0.6)	19.9 (−6.7)	40.4 (4.7)
Mean daily minimum °F (°C)	1.2 (−17.1)	2.9 (−16.2)	13.8 (−10.1)	28.2 (−2.1)	38.9 (3.8)	48.7 (9.3)	53.3 (11.8)	52.1 (11.2)	43.9 (6.6)	33.5 (0.8)	25.0 (−3.9)	10.8 (−11.8)	29.5 (−1.4)
Record low °F (°C)	−36.6 (−38.1)	−40.7 (−40.4)	−29.7 (−34.3)	−2.5 (−19.2)	19.7 (−6.8)	27.0 (−2.8)	32.4 (0.2)	32.2 (0.1)	22.5 (−5.3)	14.9 (−9.5)	−9.4 (−23.0)	−27.8 (−33.2)	−40.7 (−40.4)
Average precipitation inches (mm)	2.76 (70)	2.20 (56)	2.67 (68)	3.04 (77)	3.93 (100)	4.76 (121)	4.80 (122)	4.58 (116)	4.06 (103)	4.32 (110)	3.87 (98)	3.14 (80)	44.13 (1,121)
Average snowfall inches (cm)	26.8 (68)	24.6 (62)	23.2 (59)	5.7 (14)	0.4 (1.0)	0.0 (0.0)	0.0 (0.0)	0.0 (0.0)	0.0 (0.0)	1.7 (4.3)	8.2 (21)	26.8 (68)	117.4 (298)
Average relative humidity (%)	81.0	76.7	68.5	61.8	61.9	68.0	71.3	71.7	74.1	73.8	77.7	79.6	72.2
Average dew point °F (°C)	7.4 (−13.7)	9.1 (−12.7)	16.2 (−8.8)	27.3 (−2.6)	38.7 (3.7)	49.9 (9.9)	55.3 (12.9)	54.1 (12.3)	47.2 (8.4)	35.9 (2.2)	26.8 (−2.9)	14.6 (−9.7)	32.0 (0.0)
Source: PRISM

Climate data for Rutland
Month	Jan	Feb	Mar	Apr	May	Jun	Jul	Aug	Sep	Oct	Nov	Dec	Year
Record high °F (°C)	70 (21)	71 (22)	86 (30)	92 (33)	93 (34)	98 (37)	98 (37)	98 (37)	94 (34)	87 (31)	79 (26)	69 (21)	98 (37)
Mean maximum °F (°C)	53 (12)	54 (12)	65 (18)	78 (26)	86 (30)	89 (32)	90 (32)	88 (31)	85 (29)	76 (24)	68 (20)	56 (13)	92 (33)
Mean daily maximum °F (°C)	29.4 (−1.4)	32.1 (0.1)	41.3 (5.2)	55.2 (12.9)	67.9 (19.9)	75.9 (24.4)	80.3 (26.8)	78.1 (25.6)	70.6 (21.4)	58.3 (14.6)	46.2 (7.9)	35.1 (1.7)	55.9 (13.3)
Daily mean °F (°C)	18.7 (−7.4)	20.5 (−6.4)	29.7 (−1.3)	42.9 (6.1)	55.1 (12.8)	63.7 (17.6)	68.4 (20.2)	66.3 (19.1)	58.3 (14.6)	46.8 (8.2)	36.1 (2.3)	25.7 (−3.5)	44.4 (6.9)
Mean daily minimum °F (°C)	8.0 (−13.3)	8.8 (−12.9)	18.1 (−7.7)	30.6 (−0.8)	42.2 (5.7)	51.5 (10.8)	56.4 (13.6)	54.4 (12.4)	46.0 (7.8)	35.3 (1.8)	26.0 (−3.3)	16.3 (−8.7)	32.8 (0.4)
Mean minimum °F (°C)	−14 (−26)	−11 (−24)	−2 (−19)	18 (−8)	29 (−2)	38 (3)	46 (8)	43 (6)	32 (0)	23 (−5)	11 (−12)	−4 (−20)	−18 (−28)
Record low °F (°C)	−36 (−38)	−30 (−34)	−20 (−29)	1 (−17)	20 (−7)	28 (−2)	35 (2)	32 (0)	23 (−5)	14 (−10)	−10 (−23)	−30 (−34)	−36 (−38)
Average precipitation inches (mm)	2.69 (68)	2.16 (55)	2.73 (69)	3.11 (79)	3.63 (92)	4.26 (108)	4.56 (116)	3.98 (101)	3.41 (87)	3.98 (101)	2.76 (70)	3.02 (77)	40.29 (1,023)
Average snowfall inches (cm)	18.3 (46)	16.0 (41)	13.8 (35)	3.2 (8.1)	0.0 (0.0)	0.0 (0.0)	0.0 (0.0)	0.0 (0.0)	0.0 (0.0)	0.3 (0.76)	4.7 (12)	18.3 (46)	74.6 (189)
Average extreme snow depth inches (cm)	10 (25)	12 (30)	11 (28)	3 (7.6)	0 (0)	0 (0)	0 (0)	0 (0)	0 (0)	0 (0)	2 (5.1)	7 (18)	16 (41)
Average precipitation days (≥ 0.01 in)	13.2	10.3	11.5	11.6	12.9	12.7	12.2	11.0	9.9	12.6	11.5	14.0	143.4
Average snowy days (≥ 0.1 in)	9.5	8.0	5.7	1.8	0.0	0.0	0.0	0.0	0.0	0.2	3.0	8.1	36.3
Source: NOAA

== Geology ==
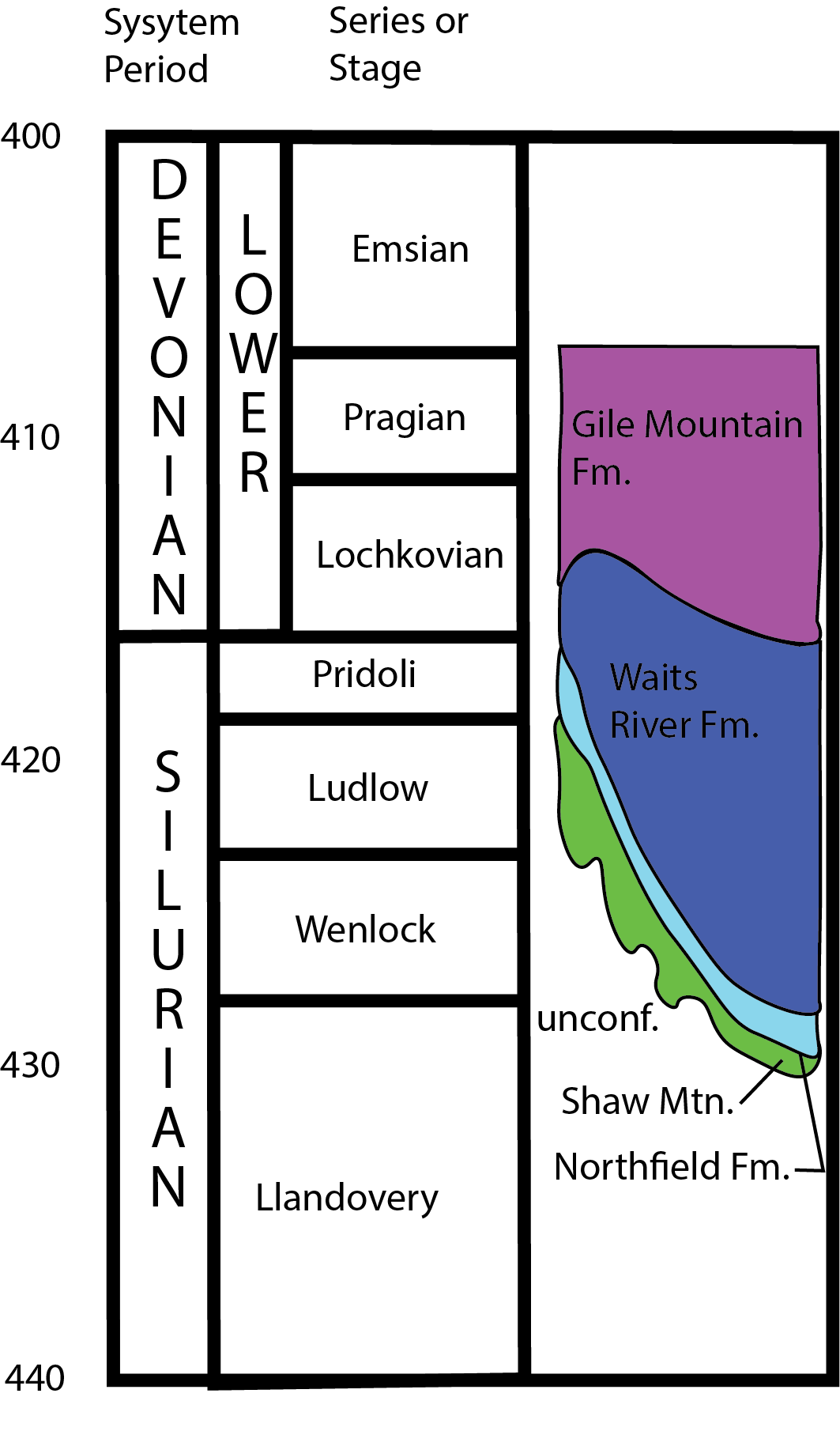
Silurian and Devonian stratigraphy of Vermont

There are five distinct physiographic regions of Vermont. Categorized by geological and physical attributes, they are the Northeastern Highlands, the Green Mountains, the Taconic Mountains, the Champlain Lowlands, and the Vermont Piedmont.

About 500 million years ago, Vermont was part of Laurentia and located in the tropics. The central and southern Green Mountain range include the oldest rocks in Vermont, formed about one billion years ago during the first mountain building period (or orogeny). Subsequently, about 400 million years ago, the second mountain building period created Green Mountain peaks that were 15,000–20,000 feet (4,600–6,100 m) tall, three to four times their current height and comparable to the Himalayas. The geological pressures that created those peaks remain evident as the Champlain Thrust, running north–south to the west of the mountains (now the eastern shore of Lake Champlain). It is an example of geological fault thrusting where bedrock is pushed over the newer rock formation.

As a result of tectonic formation, Vermont east of the Green Mountains tends to be formed from rocks produced in the Silurian and Devonian periods, and western Vermont mainly from the older Pre-Cambrian and Cambrian material. Several large deposits within the state contain granite. The remains of the Chazy Formation can be observed in Isle La Motte. It was one of the first tropical reefs. It is the site of the limestone Fisk Quarry, which contains a collection of ancient marine fossils, such as stromatoporoids, that date to 200 million years ago. At one point, Vermont is believed to have been connected to Africa (Pangaea); the fossils found and the rock formations found on the coasts in both Africa and America are evidence affirming the Pangaea theory.

In the past four centuries, Vermont has experienced a few earthquakes, rarely centered under the state. The highest ranked, in 1952, had a Richter magnitude scale 6.0 and was based in Canada.

== Wildlife ==
=== Fauna ===
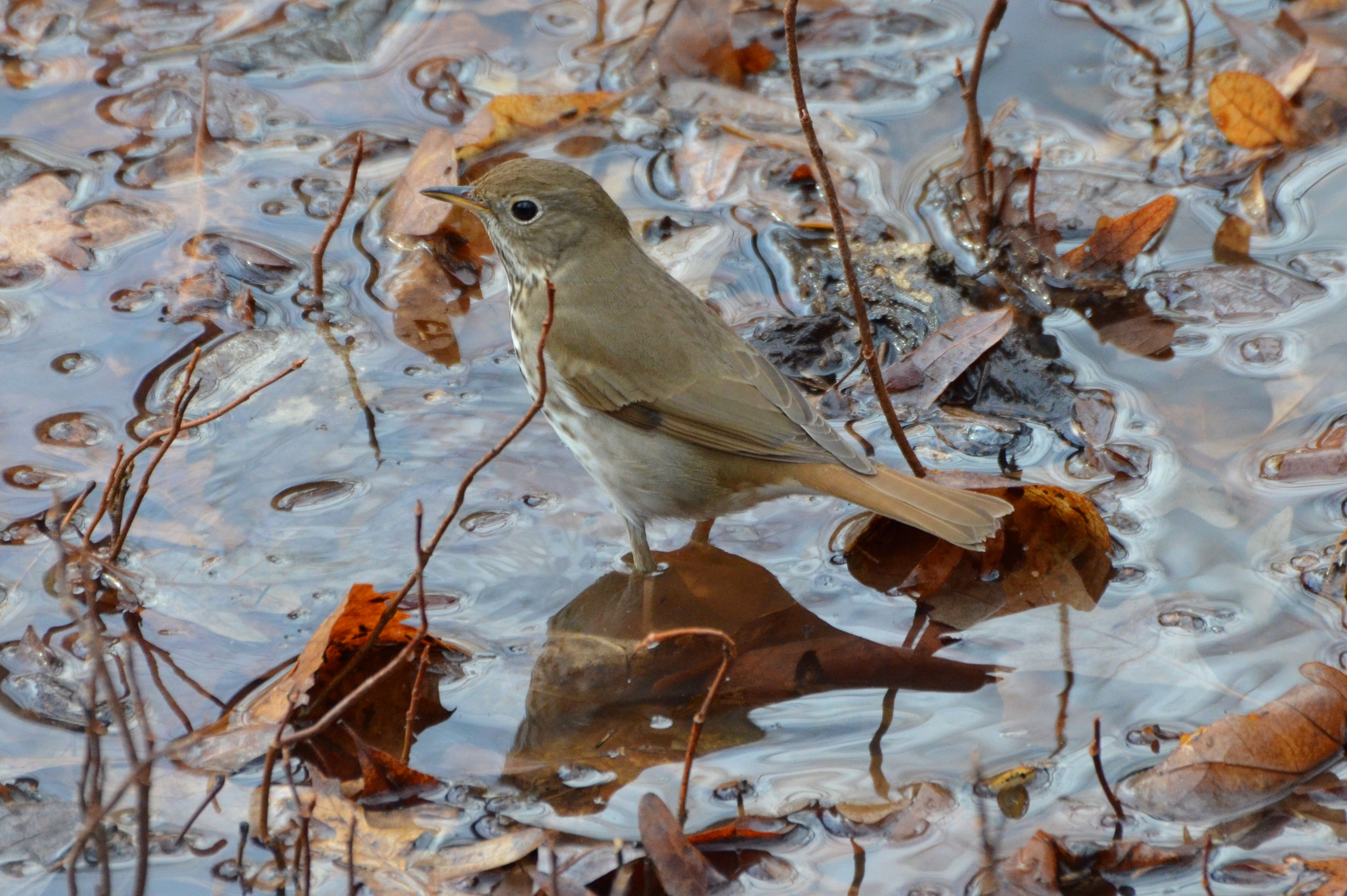
The hermit thrush, the state bird of Vermont

The state contains 41 species of reptiles and amphibians (including the spring peeper), 89 species of fish, of which 12 are non native; 193 species of breeding birds, 58 species of mammals (including black bears, eastern chipmunks, coyotes, fishers, red and gray foxes, porcupines, and woodchucks), more than 15,000 insect species (including luna moths), and 2,000 higher plant species, plus fungi, algae, and 75 different types of natural communities. Vermont contains one species of venomous snake, the timber rattlesnake, which is confined to a few acres in western Rutland County.

Wildlife has suffered because of human development of the state. By the mid-19th century, wild turkeys were exterminated in the state through overhunting and destruction of habitat. Sixteen were re-introduced in 1969, and had grown to a flock estimated to number 45,000 in 2009. In 2013, hunters killed 6,968 of these. Since 1970, reduction of farmland has resulted in reduced environment for, and resulted in a decline in numbers of various shrubland birds, including the American woodcock, brown thrasher, eastern towhee, willow flycatcher, golden-winged warbler, blue-winged warbler, field sparrow, and Baltimore oriole. Ospreys, whose eggs were previously damaged by DDT, began to reappear in 1998 and by 2010 were no longer endangered in the state.

Several species have declined or disappeared from the state, including bats, many of which have been killed by white-nose syndrome, the New England cottontail, out-competed by the eastern cottontail rabbit, and the yellow-banded bumblebee, gone as one of 19 species of bee in decline.

Invasive species and organisms include the Asian spotted-wing drosophila, a destroyer of crops, and eastern equine encephalitis virus whose antibodies were found in moose or deer in each of Vermont's counties.

=== Flora ===
Vermont is in the temperate broadleaf and mixed forests biome. Much of the state, in particular the Green Mountains, is covered by the conifers and northern hardwoods of the New England-Acadian forests. The western border with New York and the area around Lake Champlain lies within the Eastern Great Lakes lowland forests. The southwest corner of the state and parts of the Connecticut River are covered by northeastern coastal forests of mixed oak.

Invasive wild honeysuckle has been deemed a threat to the state's forests, native species of plants, and wildlife. Many of Vermont's rivers, including the Winooski River, have been subjected to man-made barriers to prevent flooding.

Climate change appears to be affecting the maple sugar industry. Sugar maples have been subject to stress by acid rain, asian longhorn beetles, and pear thrips. In 2011, the deer herd had grown too large for habitat, and many resorted to eating bark to survive the winter, destroying trees in the process. In addition, the sugar maples need a certain period of cold to produce sap for maple syrup. The time to tap these trees has shrunk to one week in some years. The tree may be replaced by the more aggressive Norway maples, in effect forcing the sugar maples to "migrate" north to Canada.

== See also ==
- Geology of New England
- Adirondack Mountains
- Climate of Massachusetts
- List of counties in Vermont
- List of towns in Vermont
- List of mountains of Vermont
