= Electoral reform in Vermont =

U.S. state electoral reform

Electoral reform in Vermont has been an issue for decades. Changes in electoral practices have altered how election results represent the intent of Vermont voters and influenced debates in other states.

Burlington, Vermont voters adopted Instant-runoff voting (IRV, one form of ranked voting) in 2005, and used it voting in two elections in 2006 and 2009. They repealed IRV in 2010.

In 2007, IRV legislation was headed for the Vermont Senate floor.

Vermont has one Congressional district, so gerrymandering is not a consideration in Vermont federal races.

Vermont and Maine are the only states to allow prison inmates to vote.

In 2007, H.0373 was introduced by David Zuckerman, Anne Donahue, and others in an effort to make Vermont a party to the National Popular Vote Interstate Compact, but it died in the Government Operations committee.

== Burlington adoption and repeal of IRV ==
Burlington, Vermont used instant runoff voting in two elections, having adopted it on March 1, 2005. In 2009, their second IRV election for mayor did not elect the most preferred candidate, nor did it elect a candidate chosen by a majority of the voters, though it did apparently result in a better outcome than the former plurality election would have. Burlington voters repealed IRV in 2010.

== See also ==
- 2009 Burlington mayoral election
