= Climate change in Vermont =

Climate change in the US state of Vermont

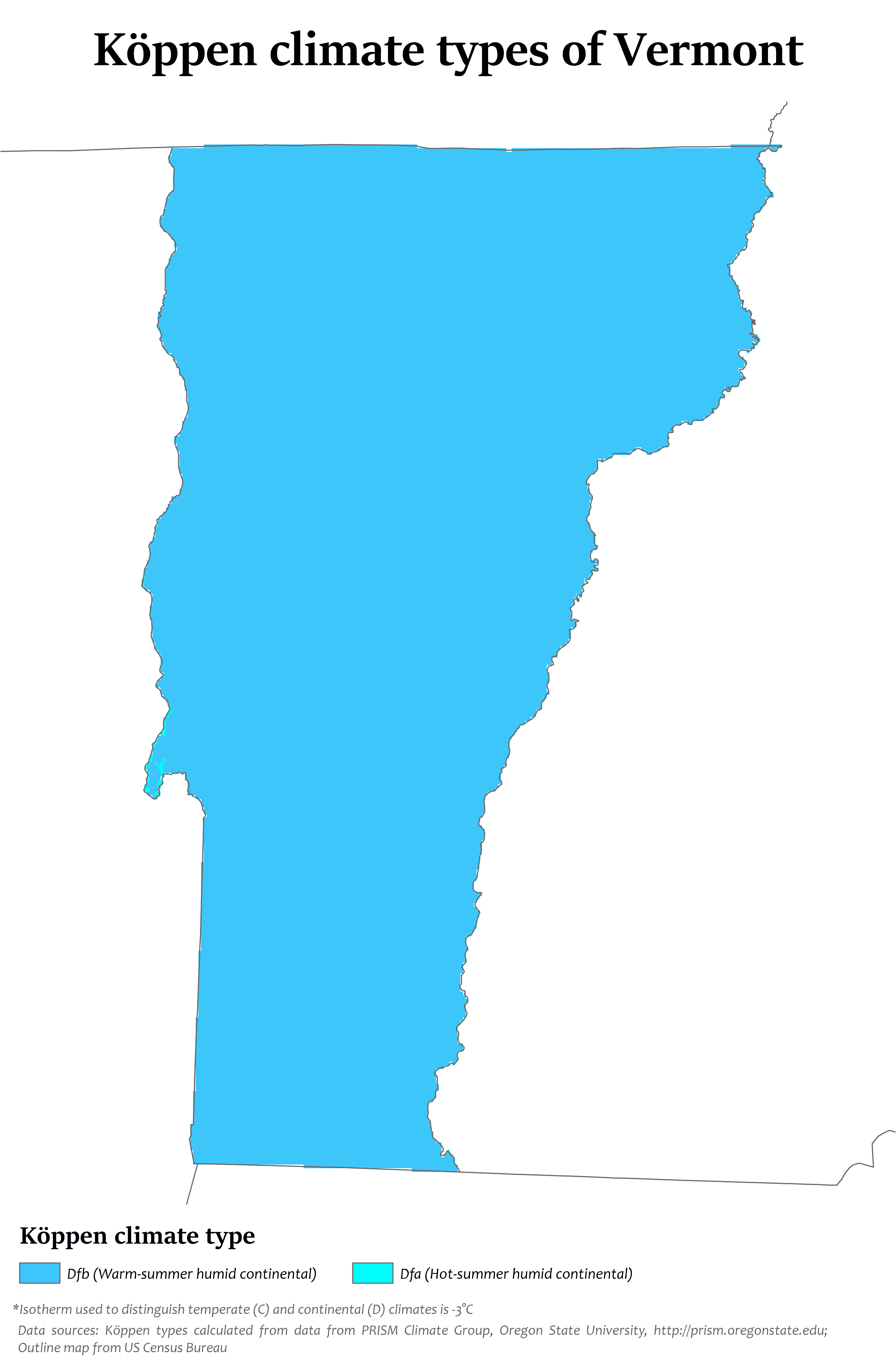
Köppen climate types in Vermont, showing that as of the mid 2010s, nearly the entire state is warm-summer humid continental.

Climate change in Vermont encompasses the effects of climate change, attributed to man-made increases in atmospheric carbon dioxide, in the U.S. state of Vermont.

The state is already seeing effects of climate change that affect its ecosystems, economy and public health. According to the Vermont state government, rainfall has significantly increased in the last 50 years, storms and flooding have increased, and winters have become warmer and shorter. These changes have led to significant impacts on both the winter tourism industry, and a decline in critical agricultural and woodland industries like maple sugaring.

The state openly acknowledges and is developing programs that respond to global warming. Vermont was one of the first states in the United States to adopt greenhouse gas emissions goals in 2006.

== Effects of climate change ==
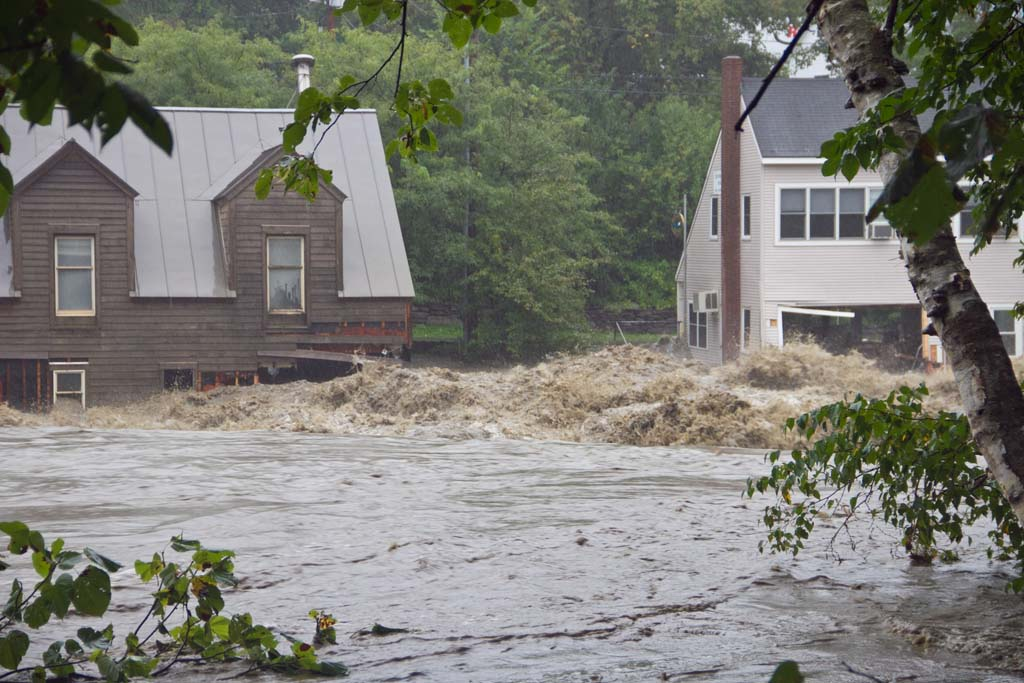
Flooding during Hurricane Irene, Quechee, 2011

According to the United States Environmental Protection Agency, "Vermont's climate is changing. The state has warmed by more than two degrees (F) in the last century. Throughout the northeastern United States, spring is arriving earlier and bringing more precipitation, heavy rainstorms are more frequent, and summers are hotter and drier. Severe storms increasingly cause floods that damage property and infrastructure. In the coming decades, changing climate is likely to harm ecosystems, disrupt agriculture and winter recreation, and increase some risks to human health".

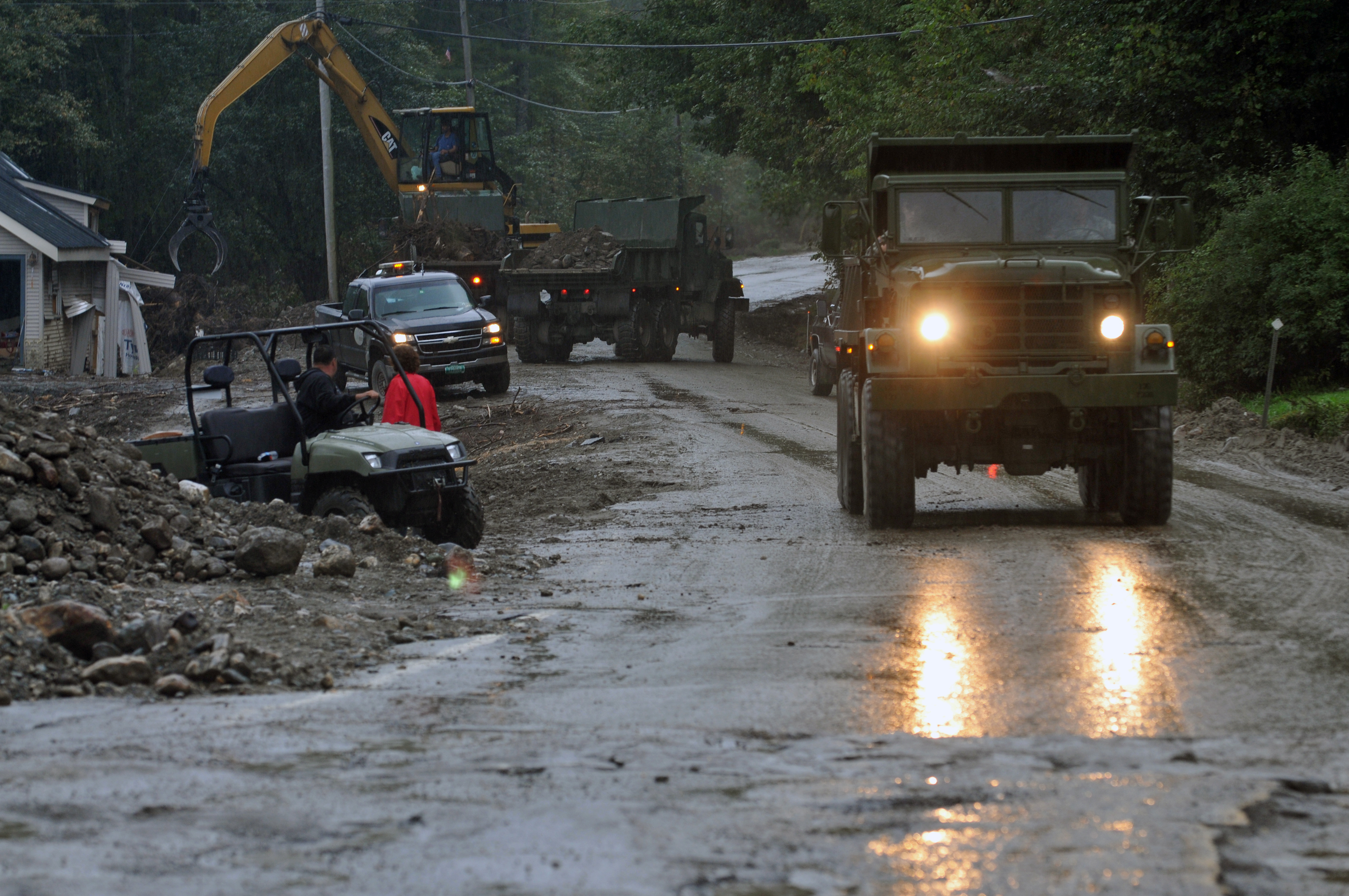
Flood cleanup, 2011

Rising temperatures and shifting rainfall patterns are likely to increase the intensity of both floods and droughts. Average annual precipitation in the Northeast increased 10 percent from 1895 to 2011, and precipitation from extremely heavy storms has increased 70 percent since 1958.

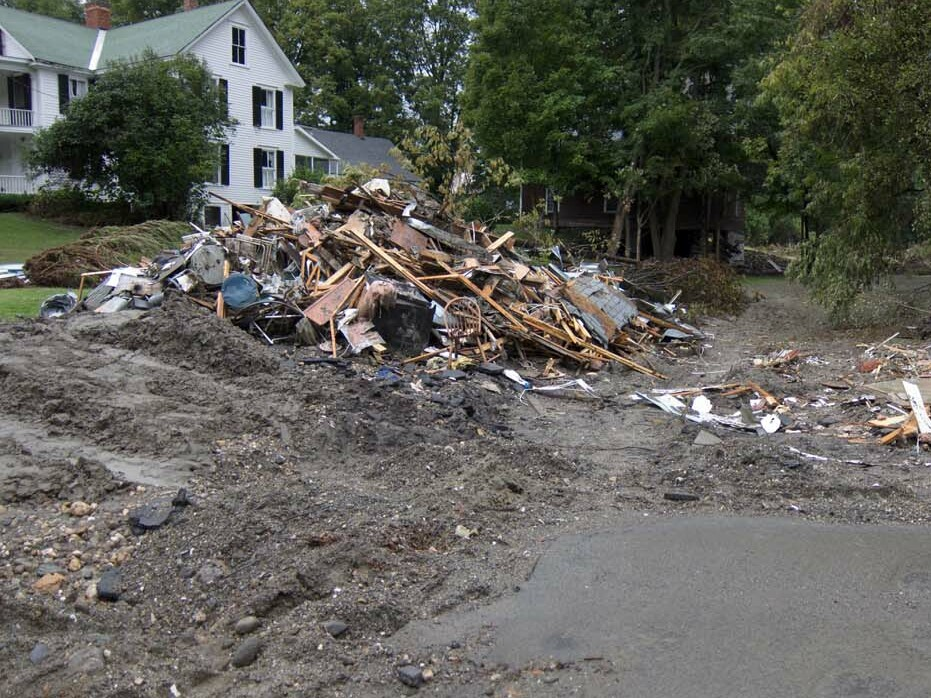
Flood debris, Royalton

During the next century, average annual precipitation and the frequency of heavy downpours are likely to keep rising. Average precipitation is likely to increase during winter and spring, but not change significantly during summer and fall. Rising temperatures will melt snow earlier in spring and increase evaporation, and thereby dry the soil during summer and fall. So flooding is likely to be worse during winter and spring, and droughts worse during summer and fall.

== Ecosystems ==
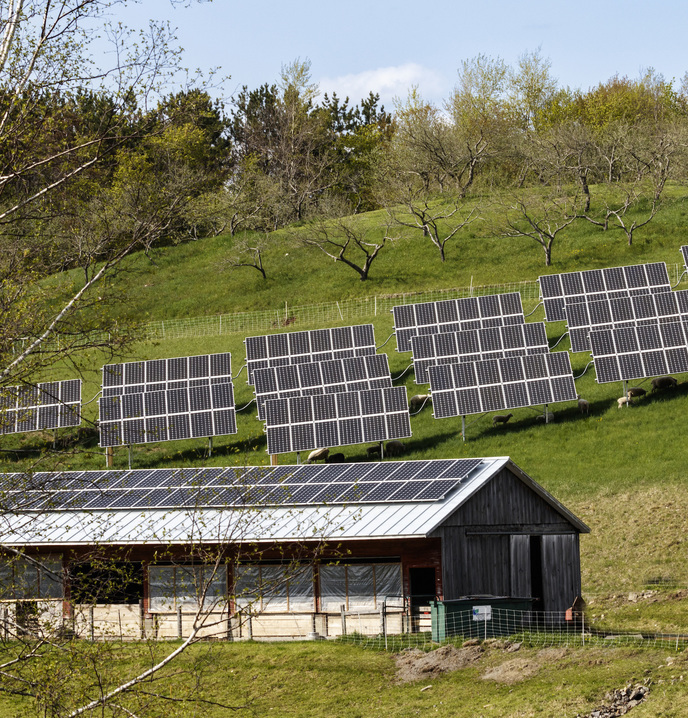
Solar panels, farm

Changing climate threatens ecosystems by disrupting relationships between species. Wildflowers and woody perennials are blooming—and migratory birds are arriving—sooner in spring. Not all species adjust in the same way, however, so the food that one species needs may no longer be available when that species arrives on its migration. Warmer temperatures allow deer populations to increase, leading to a loss of forest underbrush, which makes some animals more vulnerable to predators.

Climate change can allow invasive species to expand their ranges. For example, the hemlock woolly adelgid has infested hemlock trees in southern Vermont. Infestation eventually kills almost all hemlock trees, which are replaced by black oaks, black birch, and other hardwoods. Warmer temperatures are likely to enable the woolly adelgid to expand northward. The loss of hemlock trees would remove the primary habitat for the blue-headed vireo and Blackburnian warbler. It could also change stream temperatures and cause streams to run dry more often, harming brook trout and brown trout. Similarly the Emerald ash borer has expanded north into Vermont forests capitalizing on the warming winters.

Additionally, whereas previously Lyme disease was not prevalent in Vermont, because the ticks that carry the disease were not common, now it is.

== Economy ==
Vermont has a largely rural and small town economy, which depends heavily on tourism and agriculture. However, the state's emphasis and early adoption had led to a strong green technology and business sector in the state.

=== Agriculture ===
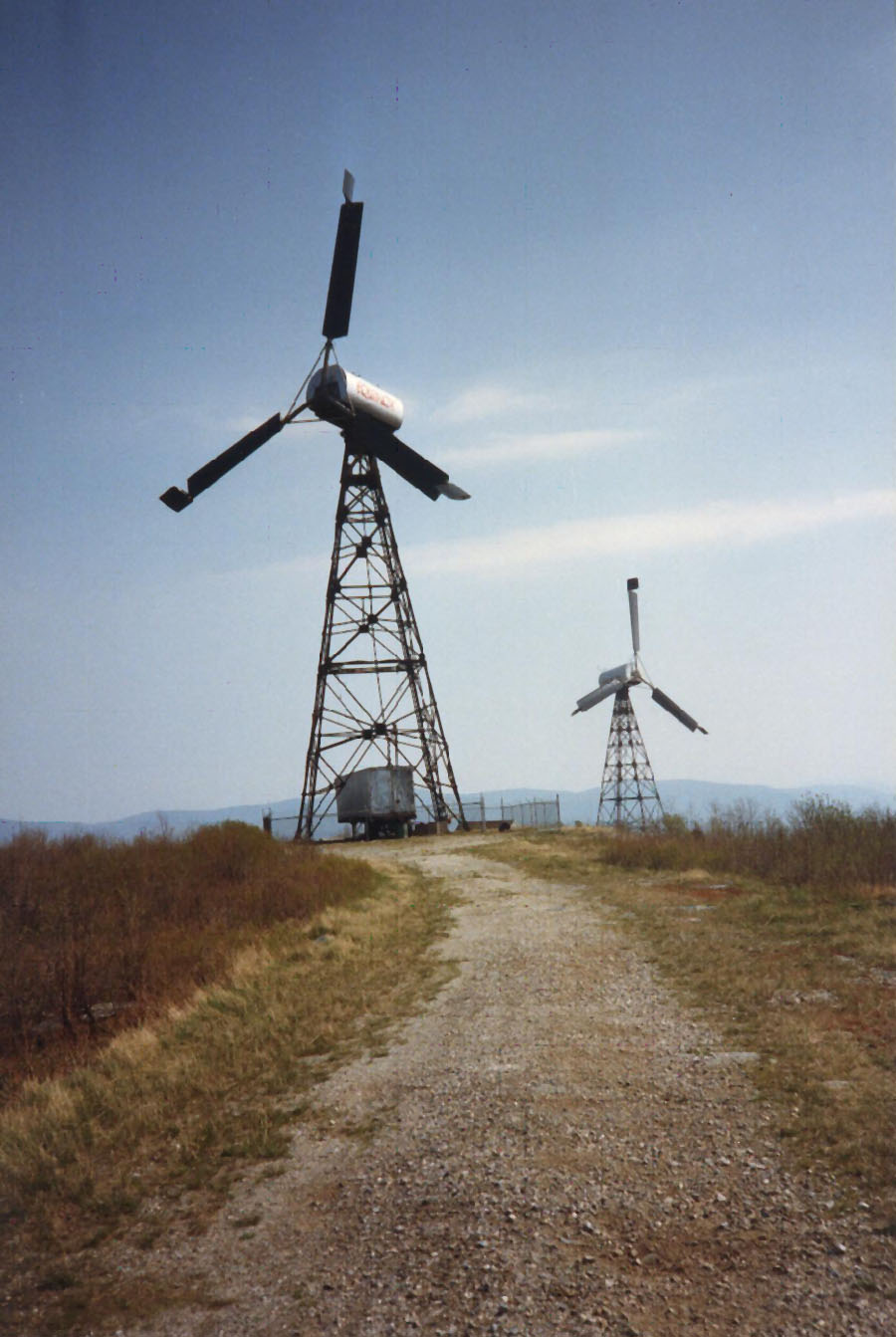
Prototype wind turbines, Little Equinox Mountain

Changing climate may reduce the output of Vermont's US $700-million dairy industry, which provides 70 percent of the state’s farm revenue. (As of 2019, about 135,000 of the 10 million US dairy cows were in Vermont.) Higher temperatures cause cows to eat less and produce less milk. Climate change may also pose challenges for field crops: Some farms may be harmed if more hot days and droughts reduce crop yields, or if more flooding and wetter springs delay their planting dates. Other farms may benefit from a longer growing season and the fertilizing effect of carbon dioxide.

Warmer temperatures are likely to shift the suitable habitat for sugar maples farther north into Canada. Scientists do not know whether warming will reduce maple syrup production in Vermont over the next few decades: although Vermont is the nation's leading maple syrup producer, maple syrup is also produced in warmer places in Pennsylvania and southern New York. The maple industry is already seeing a trend of declining production in the state, in part because of the earlier defrost.

Vermont's Hardiness zone's are also expected to change shifting most of the state from hardiness zone 4 where it was classified until 2000, into a project hardiness zone 5 for most of the state by 2040. The lack of cool temperatures and "freeze days" will negatively effect crops like blueberries, apples, and balsam firs.

=== Tourism industry ===
Climate change has affected the Vermont skiing industry. Warmer winters bring more rain and less snow to Vermont. The EPA has noted that a decline in snowfall would shorten the season during which the ground is covered with snow, which could harm recreational industries like skiing, snowboarding, and snowmobiling, and local economies that depend on them.

Moreover, the autumn foliage is becoming more uncertain. This has had an effect on the flow of visitors in that season as well.

== Public health ==
The state is already seeing increases in tick-borne and mosquito-born diseases, emergency room visits for heat related illness, and allergens: 2019 was the hottest summer on record in many parts of Vermont, and saw increased heat related illnesses.

== State response ==
In 2006, the state of Vermont was one of the first states in the United States to set greenhouse gas emission goals. Vermont's green energy programs, such as Efficiency Vermont and incentives for use of clean energy, have been effective at changing the mix of energy used in the state. Green Mountain Power, the main provider of energy in the state, is 60% renewable and 90% carbon free.

The state recognizes the need to invest in adaptation, especially since much of the state's infrastructure, housing stock, and economy were developed with much cooler environments.

In 2024, Vermont became the first state to pass a law that will penalize companies to pay for damages from extreme weather as a result of increase climate change. The law requires the State treasurer, in conjunction with the Agency of Natural Resources, to evaluate damages up to January 15, 2027 and fine companies for their share of global emissions from extracting or processing oil, gas, and coal.

In 2025, Vermont released the Resilience Implementation Strategy. The Resilience Implementation Strategy gives actions that the state can use against the negative consequences of climate change. State officials selected over 100 important actions out of a pool of over 300 methods of reducing the impact of climate hazards.

== See also ==
- Plug-in electric vehicles in Vermont
