= List of Vermont state symbols =

This is a list of symbols of the state of Vermont in the United States. The majority of symbols are officially codified in the Vermont Statutes Annotated in Title 1, Chapter 11, while others are unofficial.

Location of the State of Vermont in the United States of America

Legally recognized symbols include the mineral, flower, bird, beverage, pie, mammal, song, insect, tree, and fish, while unofficial symbols of Vermont include: maple syrup; the eastern white pine (Pinus strobus), which was worn as a badge by the Green Mountain Boys and appears on the Vermont coat of arms and Vermont Military Crest; and the white-tailed deer (Odocoileus virginianus), which also appears on the state's coat of arms. The number 14 figures prominently in the state's history and lore. The Vermont Republic lasted for fourteen years, the pine tree on the Great Seal of Vermont has fourteen branches, the state has fourteen counties, and Vermont was the fourteenth state in the Union.

Vermont's state song is "These Green Mountains", composed by Diane Martin and arranged by Rita Buglass Gluck. This song was officially designated as the state song on 22 May 2000. This song replaced "Hail to Vermont!", which was written by Josephine Hovey-Perry and made the state song in 1938. However, "Moonlight in Vermont" remains an unofficial favorite.

The state bird is the hermit thrush (Catharus guttatus). This was adopted in 1941. The bird was only designated after debate in the legislature; though the hermit thrush is found in all of 14 counties and has a distinctive sweet call, it leaves the state during the winter for its yearly southward migration. Many legislators favored the blue jay (Cyanocitta cristata).

The red clover (Trifolium pratense) was designated as the state flower by the Vermont General Assembly in 1895. The red clover is often seen in the countryside of Vermont hosting the state insect – the western honey bee (Apis mellifera), designated by Act 124 of the 1978 biennial session of the Vermont General Assembly. A natural companion and frequent visitor to the state flower, the honey bee was chosen for its agricultural benefits, and for being a "social" insect and representing the unity side of Vermont's state motto Freedom and Unity.

Vermont named two official state fish by Joint Resolution of the Vermont General Assembly in 1978 and statute in 2011: the cold-water fish, the brook trout (Salvelinus fontinalis) and the warm-water fish, the walleye (Sander vitreous vitreous).

The state tree is the sugar maple (Acer saccharum), effective in 1949. The sugar maple is the source of maple syrup, Vermont's most famous export. The state mushroom is the bear's head tooth fungus (Hericium americanum), effective in 2024.

The Morgan horse became the state mammal in 1961. The Morgan horse is a horse breed originally from Vermont, and named for Justin Morgan. The state maintains standards and develops bloodlines for the breed at the University of Vermont's Morgan Horse Farm at Weybridge.

Vermont has also designated an official state mineral (talc), pie (apple pie), soil ("Tunbridge Soil Series"), beverage (milk), gem (grossular garnet), and fossil (the beluga skeleton at the University of Vermont's Perkins Geology Museum).

The state reptile is the painted turtle. The state rocks are granite, marble, and slate.

Vermont is distinct for being among only three U.S. states with both a state seal and a coat of arms. Vermont is the only U.S. state to have a heraldically correct blazon describing its coat of arms.

== Insignia ==
Type	Symbol	Year	Image
Flag	Flag of Vermont	1923	Flag of Vermont
Seal	Seal of Vermont	1779	Seal of Vermont
Coat of arms	Coat of arms of Vermont	1862	Coat of arms of Vermont
Motto(s)	Freedom and Unity Stella quarta decima fulgeat (May the fourteenth star shine bright)	1788 2015	
Nickname	The Green Mountain State		
Anthem	These Green Mountains	2000	

== Nature symbols ==
Type	Symbol	Year	Image
Butterfly	Monarch; Danaus plexippus	1987	Red-spotted purple/white admiral
Bird	Hermit thrush Catharus guttatus	1941	Hermit thrush
Amphibian	Northern leopard frog Rana pipiens	1997	Beaver

== See also ==
- List of Vermont-related topics
- Lists of United States state insignia
- State of Vermont
