= Vermont Distinguished Service Medal =

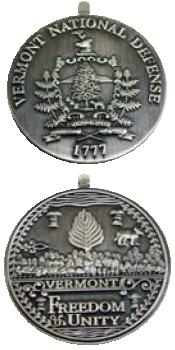
- Black-and-white image of medal
- Type: Military medal Distinguished service medal
- Awarded for: Federal service in a combat theater
- Description: Silver medal
- Country: United States
- Presented by: Vermont
- Eligibility: Veterans from Vermont
- Motto: Vermont National Defense
- Status: Active
- Established: 1999 (retroactive)
- Vermont medal ribbon

Precedence
- Next (lower): Vermont Veterans Medal
- Related: Vermont Patriots Medal

The Vermont Distinguished Service Medal is awarded to U.S. veterans from Vermont who served in a combat theater. The medal was established in 1999, but is retroactively available to veterans of prior military service.

The Vermont Distinguished Service Medal is a state award, presented by the Vermont Department of Veterans Affairs. U.S. military active duty regulations allow their members to accept but not wear state awards. In addition, activated National Guard members may not wear their state awards while serving in Title 10 (federal) status.

== Eligibility ==
1. Must have been a Vermont resident when entered military; or be a current Vermont resident; or be a member of a reserve or guard unit stationed in Vermont.
2. Received an honorable discharge, unless died prior to separation.
3. Must have served in a combat theater, as evidenced by receipt of combat related decorations.

== Description ==
Following is the blazon narrative describing the Vermont Veterans Medal:

The ribbons of the Vermont medals for veterans contain the four primary colors of the coat of arms of Vermont: red, yellow, blue and green.

The alternating red and yellow at the center of the ribbon loosely parallels the design and colors of the National Defense Service Medal, which is presented to military members with service during a time of conflict.

Field of azure blue encompasses the red and yellow, symbolizing the honor of military service.

Next, fields of green represent Vermont, the Green Mountain State, which reminds us that service to our nation is also service to the citizens of our state.

The edges of this ribbon are bordered in yellow. In the Vermont coat of arms, bundles of wheat are shown in yellow. In this ribbon, they represent the protection offered our state by nature's bounty.

The medal is cast in silver, with the coat of arms of Vermont on the obverse and the Great Seal of Vermont on the reverse. Across the top is inscribed “Vermont National Defense,” uniting the interests of our state with our nation.

The year “1777” is inscribed at the bottom, indicating the year of the Battle of Bennington where Vermonters first took arms to defend their state in war, and the year of the founding of the Vermont Republic.

== Sources ==
- "Recognition for Your Service". State of Vermont’s Office of Veterans Affairs. May 18, 2020.
- "2005 Vermont Code - § 1546. Original State Statute for Vermont veterans' medal". Justia.com.
- "The Vermont Statutes Online - 20 V.S.A. § 1545. Vermont distinguished service medals". legislature.vermont.gov.
