= Vermont Patriots Medal =

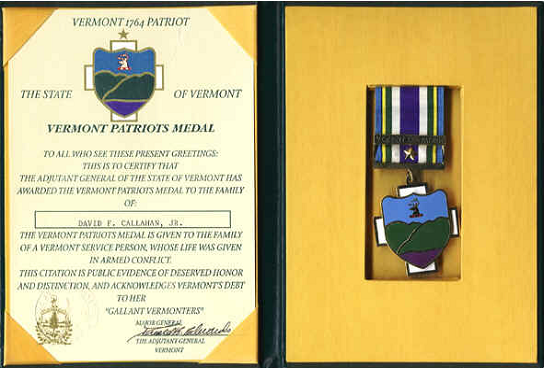
- Medal and scroll in presentation case
- Type: Medal
- Awarded for: Federal service
- Description: Gilt edged enamel medal
- Country: United States
- Presented by: Vermont
- Eligibility: Families of Vermont service members killed in action
- Motto: "Vermont Patriot 1764"
- Status: Active
- Established: 1966
- First award: 1996 (retroactive)

Highlights
- Total awarded posthumously: Yes
- Vermont Patriots Medal Ribbon
- Related: Vermont Distinguished Service Medal; Vermont Veterans Medal

The Vermont Patriots Medal is an award of the state of Vermont. It is presented to the next of kin of each Vermont military service member who is killed in armed conflict. The award was first authorized in 1966, during the Vietnam War, but presentations did not commence until 1996.

== Eligibility ==
Award of the Vermont Patriots Medal is managed by the Vermont Office of Veterans Affairs. The adjutant general of the Vermont National Guard is authorized to present the medal and a scroll acknowledging Vermont's debt to the family to the next of kin of each Vermont service member whose life is given in an armed conflict. The costs associated with creating the medal, and presenting the award and scroll are paid for from the state's legislative budget.

== Description ==
The Vermont Patriots Medal is presented in a bi-fold padded green leatherette case measuring 5 1/2 x 7 1/2 inches, with the words "Vermont Patriots Medal" in gilt letters. On the left side is a scroll which notes that the medal is presented to the family of a Vermont military service member whose life was given in armed conflict. On the right the medal is set inside a shadow box.

The medal is a cross of white enamel with gold edges, symbolic of the 1st Vermont Brigade, and dates to the Union Army of the American Civil War. Covering the cross is a shield of inlaid enamel with gold edges, which depicts a scene of Vermont as viewed looking east from Lake Champlain towards Camel's Hump and Mount Mansfield under a clear sky, all underneath the head of a white-tailed deer buck, a scene taken from the state's coat of arms. The shield is also reminiscent of the insignia of the 172nd Infantry Regiment, a Vermont unit which fought in the Pacific Theater during World War II.

The ribbon is a center stripe of purple with white edges, reminiscent of the Purple Heart. Emanating from each side of the white stripes are stripes of green, gold, and blue. Green represents Vermont's Green Mountains, while blue represents the state's lakes and streams beneath a clear blue sky. Gold represents the state's brave and creative people, Vermont's most valuable resource.

Attached to the ribbon is a clasp that connects to a straight bar hanger which attaches the medal to the ribbon. The clasp reads "Vermont Patriot 1764", and indicates the name of the medal and the year Vermont, then called the New Hampshire Grants, created its first militia unit in Bennington. A bronze star is also attached to the ribbon, which evokes the symbolism of Vermont's admission to the Union as the 14th state, also referred to allegorically as the "14th Star" (Stella quarta decima). In addition, the bronze star device evokes the sacrifice a single service member whose family receives the award has made on behalf of the state and nation.

== History ==
In 1966, the Vermont General Assembly approved Joint Resolution #42, which authorized the development of the Vermont Patriots Medal, which would be awarded to the families of Vermont servicemen who were killed in Vietnam. Creation of the medal was not funded, and criteria for managing and presenting the award were not developed, so it was never produced.

In 1996, the Vermont State Council of Vietnam Veterans of America re-publicized the Vermont Patriots Medal, and the state legislature passed an amended bill to make funds available for the medal so it could be created and presented to the surviving family members of Vermont's Vietnam War dead. The law was later amended to include the families of Vermont service members killed in all wars.

Design of the Vermont Patriots Medal was done by a veteran who initially wished to remain anonymous. He was later identified as L. Leigh Sykes, a Vietnam War veteran of the United States Air Force.

== Sources ==
=== Internet ===
- Rowan, John P. ""Better Late Than Never" -- The Vermont Patriots Medal". VVAVTSC.com. Shelburne, VT: Vietnam Veterans of America, Vermont State Council.

=== Books ===
- Berman, Neil S.; Guth, Ron (2008). Coin Collecting For Dummies. Indianapolis, IN: Wiley Publishing. ISBN 978-0-470-22275-1.
- Hanraty, Peter H.; et al. (1979). Put the Vermonters Ahead: A History of the Vermont National Guard, 1764-1978. Queen City Printers: Burlington, VT.
- Walker, Aldace Freeman (1869). The Vermont Brigade in the Shenandoah Valley, 1864. Burlington, VT: Free Press Association.
