= Vermont copper =

National currency of the Vermont Republic from 1785 to 1791

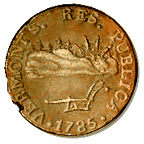
Obverse of the 1785 design shows a plow and the Sun rising over the Green Mountains. The Latin motto VERMONTS. RES. PUBLICA. can be translated to mean the republic, or commonwealth, of Vermont.

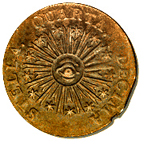
Reverse of the 1785 and 1786 design features an "all-seeing eye" with 13 stars encircled by the Latin motto STELLA. QUARTA. DECIMA. meaning the fourteenth star.

Vermont coppers were copper coins issued by the Vermont Republic. The coins were first struck in 1785 and continued to be minted until Vermont's admission to the United States in 1791 as the State of Vermont.

== History ==
On June 10, 1785, the House of Representatives of the Freemen of Vermont met to select a committee of three to consider a request from Reuben Harmon, Jr. of Rupert to mint copper coins for the new entity Vermont. Though Vermont's legislative branch at this period was unicameral, the Governor's Council, a part of the executive branch, acted as a sort of upper house. The Governor's Council appointed one of its members to join the committee studying the proposal. On June 15, 1785, the committee presented to the House of Representatives of the Freemen of Vermont their recommendation that Vermont grant Harmon "...the exclusive right of coining Copper within this State for the term of two years..." The approved language required the coins to have a minimum weight of one-third of an ounce troy weight (160 grains). The House approved the measure and sent the recommendation to the Governor's Council which concurred. On June 17, 1785, Harmon posted a required bond and began establishing his mint situated beside Hagar's Brook in Rupert.

== Design and motto ==
=== 1785 and 1786 landscape design ===
The same committee was retained to select a motto for the coins, and to oversee design. The design of the obverse, on the initial 1785 and 1786 coins, featured the Sun rising above the Green Mountains and a plow in the foreground encircled by the inscription VERMONTS. RES. PUBLICA., which can be translated as the republic, or commonwealth, of Vermont. The design of the reverse of the coin is an almost wholesale appropriation of an earlier 1783 American coin called the Nova Constellatio (new constellation) design. It features a large single star emanating rays, with an eye within, it is surrounded by a wreath of 13 smaller stars, and they are encircled by the motto STELLA QUARTA DECIMA which translates as "the 14th star". Subsequent issues altered the inscription on the obverse, variously using VERMONTIS. RES. PUBLICA. and VERMONTENSIUM. RES. PUBLICA.

=== 1787 and 1788 bust design ===
In October 1785, with new Vermont coppers in circulation, Harmon sought an extension of his exclusive two-year contract. An act, possibly written with Harmon, himself a former member of the House, extends the agreement eight years from July 1, 1787, and describes a dramatically different design. The obverse is to bear a bust, encircled with a new motto reading AUCTORITATE VERMONTENSIUM. which translates as by authority of Vermont. The reverse of the coin depicts a seated woman, and the inscription INDE ET LIB an abbreviation of independence and liberty. Sixteen variations of dies on this second set of coins were made. The new design closely resembled the British halfpenny then in circulation in the American colonies. On that coin a bust of George III is encircled by the inscription GEORGIVS. III. REX. and the reverse with a seated female embodiment of Britain called Britannia. A common explanation of the redesign of Vermont's coins, so close to the British half-pence model, has been made to make their circulation and exchange easier beyond Vermont's boundaries.

=== Symbolism ===
While the 1785 Act of the Vermont House describes the design of the bust and seated female figure design in detail, no notes of the period exist on the meaning of either the mottoes or imagery of Vermont's copper coinage. Twentieth century numismatists Kenneth Bressett, Tony Carlotto and Hillyer Ryder offer nearly identical explanations of the imagery and mottoes. The depiction of the Sun rising above the Green Mountains is to indicate peace, and possibly the approval of Divine Providence. The plow may simply represent agriculture, a primary activity and industry of the young state, but might also allude to the story of Cincinnatus the ancient Roman citizen-farmer who left his plow in the field to serve Rome as consul, fight the encroachment of aristocracy, and later return to his field. The large single star, with the eye, on the 1785 and 1786 issues, is nearly identical in design to a widely available typographic device, or dingbat, of the time called the Eye of Providence, a Deist and Masonic image suggestive of an all-seeing God. Here however the star may simply be Vermont itself, centered among the 13 stars likely used to suggest the existing 13 American states. The addition of the motto STELLA QUARTA DECIMA, the 14th star, is cited as a hope for eventual statehood. The seated female on the reverse side of the second design is modeled on the Britannia figure then on British half-penny. A similar seated female is found on the reverse of the coat of arms of Vermont, and is described variously as Agriculture, or Ceres.

== See also ==
- Copper Panic of 1789
- Early American currency
- Thomas Machin
