= Second Vermont Republic =

Secessionist group in US state

- Flag adopted by the 2VR movement
- Abbreviation: 2VR
- Formation: 2003
- Founder: Thomas Naylor
- Type: Political
- Purpose: Secession of Vermont into independent republic
- Location: Charlotte, Vermont
- Affiliations: Middlebury Institute, Vermont Commons
- Website: https://vermontindependent.net/

The Second Vermont Republic (SVR, 2VR) is a secessionist group within the U.S. state of Vermont which seeks to restore the formerly independent status of the Vermont Republic (1777–91). It describes itself as "a nonviolent citizens' network and think tank opposed to the tyranny of Corporate America and the U.S. government, and committed to the peaceful return of Vermont to its status as an independent republic and more broadly the dissolution of the Union." The organization was founded in 2003 by Thomas Naylor (1936–2012), a former Duke University economics professor and co-author of the 1997 book Downsizing the U.S.A. A 2010 TIME article featured the Second Vermont Republic as one of the "Top 10 Aspiring Nations".

== History ==
The Second Vermont Republic movement was founded in 2003 by Thomas Naylor, who published the book The Vermont Manifesto that same year. He was motivated by the September 11 attacks. Vermont's Bread and Puppet Theater were early supporters. Naylor began informal meetings of the group, holding the first statewide meeting in October 2003. In June 2004 Second Vermont Republic and Bread & Puppet Theater sponsored a parade in Montpelier and a rally of over 300 people at the State House calling for Vermont independence. University of Vermont professor Frank M. Bryan, co-author of the humorous novel OUT! The Vermont Secession Book, later joined the Advisory Board of the Second Vermont Republic.

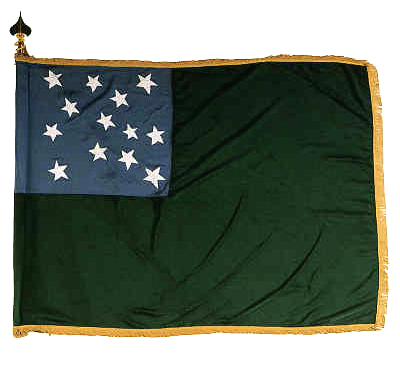
Flag of the Green Mountain Boys

The "independence" flag adopted by the Second Vermont Republic is similar in design to the Green Mountain Boys regimental flag flown by those who supported creation of the first Vermont Republic.

The Second Vermont Republic hosted a "radical consultation" in Middlebury, Vermont in November 2004 which resulted in the creation of the Middlebury Declaration and the establishment of the Middlebury Institute. In April 2005, members of Second Vermont Republic started the Vermont Commons quarterly publication. In January 2005, the Second Vermont Republic stated it had 125 card-carrying members. In October 2005 300 people attended Second Vermont Republic's first statewide secession convention in the House Chamber of the Vermont State House.

In November 2006 the group's representatives attended the First North American Secessionist Convention in Burlington, which brought together secessionists from a broad political spectrum. The convention issued the Burlington Declaration.

In April 2007 the University of Vermont Center for Rural Studies released its annual "Vermonter Poll" which showed that thirteen percent of eligible voters in Vermont supported secession. That month Frank Bryan and Vermont Commons publisher Ian Baldwin authored an op-ed piece for the Washington Post, "The Once and Future Republic of Vermont". The authors wrote "Vermont did not join the Union to become part of an empire. Some of us therefore seek permission to leave." In June 2007, Frank Bryan stated that "the cachet of secession would make the new republic a magnet" and "People would obviously relish coming to the Republic of Vermont, the Switzerland of North America." In November 2007, Naylor also endorsed the idea of a greater "New Acadia, comprising of Vermont, New Hampshire, Maine, and the Canadian provinces of New Brunswick, Prince Edward Island, Nova Scotia, and Newfoundland and Labrador.

In May 2008, Feral House published Thomas Naylor's book Secession: How Vermont and all the Other States Can Save Themselves from the Empire. Author Kirkpatrick Sale wrote the foreword. In the book he writes about diplomat George F. Kennan being "a major source of inspiration for the Second Vermont Republic." A 2010 Time magazine article quoted Naylor as describing the Second Vermont Republic as "left-libertarian, anti-big government, anti-empire, antiwar, with small is beautiful as our guiding philosophy".

In 2012 Thomas Naylor, Kirkpatrick Sale, Chellis Glendinning, Carolyn Chute and two others issued "The Montpelier Manifesto", carried on the Second Vermont Republic website, as a "Document of Grievances and Abuses" with specific suggestions for a "Redress of Grievances."

== Political campaigns ==
In January 2010, nine Vermonters announced they were planning to run for governor, lieutenant governor and seven seats in the state Senate on a Vermont secession platform and labeling their effort "Vermont Independence Day." A Time magazine article quoted gubernatorial secessionist candidate Dennis Steele's statement that his first act of office would be bringing Vermont National Guard members home from overseas military deployments.

Frank Bryan criticized the 2010 secessionist electoral candidates for running for statewide offices instead of local offices to establish a record. "They want to go to the top immediately with candidates who really don't have a lot of experience in governing." Naylor disagreed, saying "Dennis Steele has done more for the Vermont independence movement in the last six months than anyone has done in the last seven years. The only way you could have that platform is by running for governor."

Gubernatorial candidate Dennis Steele received 0.8 percent of votes cast for that office; Lieutenant Governor candidate Peter Garritano received 4.7 percent. Both ran as independents.

In September 2012 the Vermont Independence Party held its convention inside the Vermont Statehouse.

== Reception ==
In 2006, John McClaughry, president of Vermont's Institute for Liberty and Community and co-author with Frank Bryan of The Vermont Papers, Recreating Democracy on a Human Scale, told the Los Angeles Times: "This really is a good-natured cult. Intellectually, they've got some horsepower, but mostly this is the whole left-wing litany, seen through an interesting prism." Secession, said McClaughry, "is not going to happen, and no one believes it is going to happen."

In early 2007, an anonymously written blog, using material published by the Southern Poverty Law Center (SPLC), revealed that some advisory board members had affiliations with Neo-Confederate groups, such as the League of the South (LOS), resulting in internal and public controversy. In reaction, SVR co-founder Thomas Naylor told The Vermont Guardian that the organization has no direct link to LOS, except a link on the SVR website, and that SVR is not racist. He told a radio audience: "The SPLC is a well-known McCarthy-style group of mercenaries who routinely engage in ideological smear campaigns on behalf of their wealthy techno-fascist clowns. It's all about money, power, and greed."

However, in response to this controversy, groups such as the Green Mountain Anarchist Collective (GMAC), who were generally favorable to the idea of Vermont secession and an empowered Town Meeting system of self-government, became publicly critical of the organization. GMAC published these misgivings in the Catamount Tavern News; Vermont Secession: The Extreme Right, And Democracy.

In early 2008, SPLC did a long article about the group and interviewed Naylor. In July 2008, Naylor asked the League of the South to consider several actions to distance itself from the taint of racism. In October 2009 another SPLC article described the group's ongoing relationship with the League of the South.

== See also ==
- Flag of the Vermont Republic
- Green Mountain Anarchist Collective
- History of Vermont
- Politics of Vermont
- Killington, Vermont secession movement
- Free State Project
