= Flag of Vermont =

U.S. state flag

State of Vermont
- Use: Civil and state flag
- Proportion: 3:5
- Adopted: June 1, 1923; 103 years ago
- Design: The Coat of Arms of Vermont on a blue field.

The flag of the U.S. state of Vermont displays the state's coat of arms and motto ("Freedom and Unity") on a rectangular blue background. The Vermont General Assembly adopted the flag on June 1, 1923.

Vermont has had three official state flags. Prior to a state flag, the flag of the Green Mountain Boys was used as an unofficial flag. Vermont adopted its first state flag that looked similar to the flag of the United States, with red and white stripes and a blue canton. It was later changed to be dissimilar to avoid confusion. Proposals have been considered to revert the flag to the Green Mountain Boys' design, but none have succeeded.

== Statute ==
The 2025 Vermont Statutes, Title 1, Chapter 11, § 495, defines that the state flag shall be:

...blue with the Coat of Arms of the State thereon.

=== Design of the coat of arms ===
The Vermont Statutes § 491 (2025) defines the state Coat of Arms, crest, motto, and badge as follows:

Coat of Arms: Green, a landscape occupying half of the shield; on the right and left, in the background, high mountains, blue; the sky, yellow. From near the base and reaching nearly to the top of the shield, arises a pine tree of the natural color and between three erect sheaves, yellow, placed diagonally on the right side and a red cow standing on the left side of the field.

Motto and Badge: On a scroll beneath the shield, the motto: Vermont; Freedom and Unity. The Vermonter's badge: two pine branches of natural color, crossed between the shield and scroll.

Crest: A buck's head, of natural color, placed on a scroll, blue and yellow.

== Symbolism ==
While the pine needle supporters of the coat of arms are represented throughout New England and symbolizes the small pine branches worn at the Battle of Plattsburgh near the end of the War of 1812, the pine tree in the middle of the coat of arms represents the Vermont forests. The cow and three sheaves of wheat represent the dairy and agriculture industries. The deer head on top represents Vermont's wildlife. The Green Mountains are in the background as well. The motto, "Freedom and Unity", is also used. The motto balances two different ideals, the freedom of the individual citizen, and the welfare of the common good.

== History ==
=== Pre-official flags (before 1804) ===
Green Mountain Boys flag from the American Revolutionary War

There is no extant record of a design for an official Vermont flag prior to 1804, although Ira Allen's design—common to both the Great Seal of Vermont and the coat of arms of Vermont—dates to 1778.

While an official government flag might not have existed prior to 1804, the Vermont militia—known as the Green Mountain Boys—was formed in 1770, and remaining accounts record use of the flag of the Green Mountain Boys as far back as 1777. Proposals have been considered to make the flag of the Green Mountain Boys' the state flag of Vermont, but none have succeeded.

=== 1804 flag ===
First flag of Vermont (May 1, 1804 – October 19, 1837)

On May 1, 1804, the number of U.S. states rose to seventeen, and it was expected that the U.S. flag would change to 17 stars and 17 stripes. In anticipation, Vermont adopted the expected new U.S. flag design with the addition of the name "VERMONT" embroidered along the top.

The U.S. flag did not add any stripes, resulting in the Vermont flag having more stripes than the national flag.

=== 1837 flag ===
Second flag of Vermont (October 20, 1837 – May 31, 1923)

Variant of the second flag of Vermont (October 20, 1837 – May 31, 1923)

On October 20, 1837, Vermont changed its flag to a design based on the 13-stripe U.S. flag, but with the multiple stars of the blue canton replaced with a single large star surrounding Vermont's coat of arms. The flags based on these specifications varied in the number of points on the star (five and eight, with eight slightly more common), and the exact details of the center of the star (with either the Great Seal or the coat of arms being used).

In 1919, the Committee on Military Affairs outlined that the state flag should have a five pointed star instead of an eight pointed one.

=== Current flag (1923–present) ===
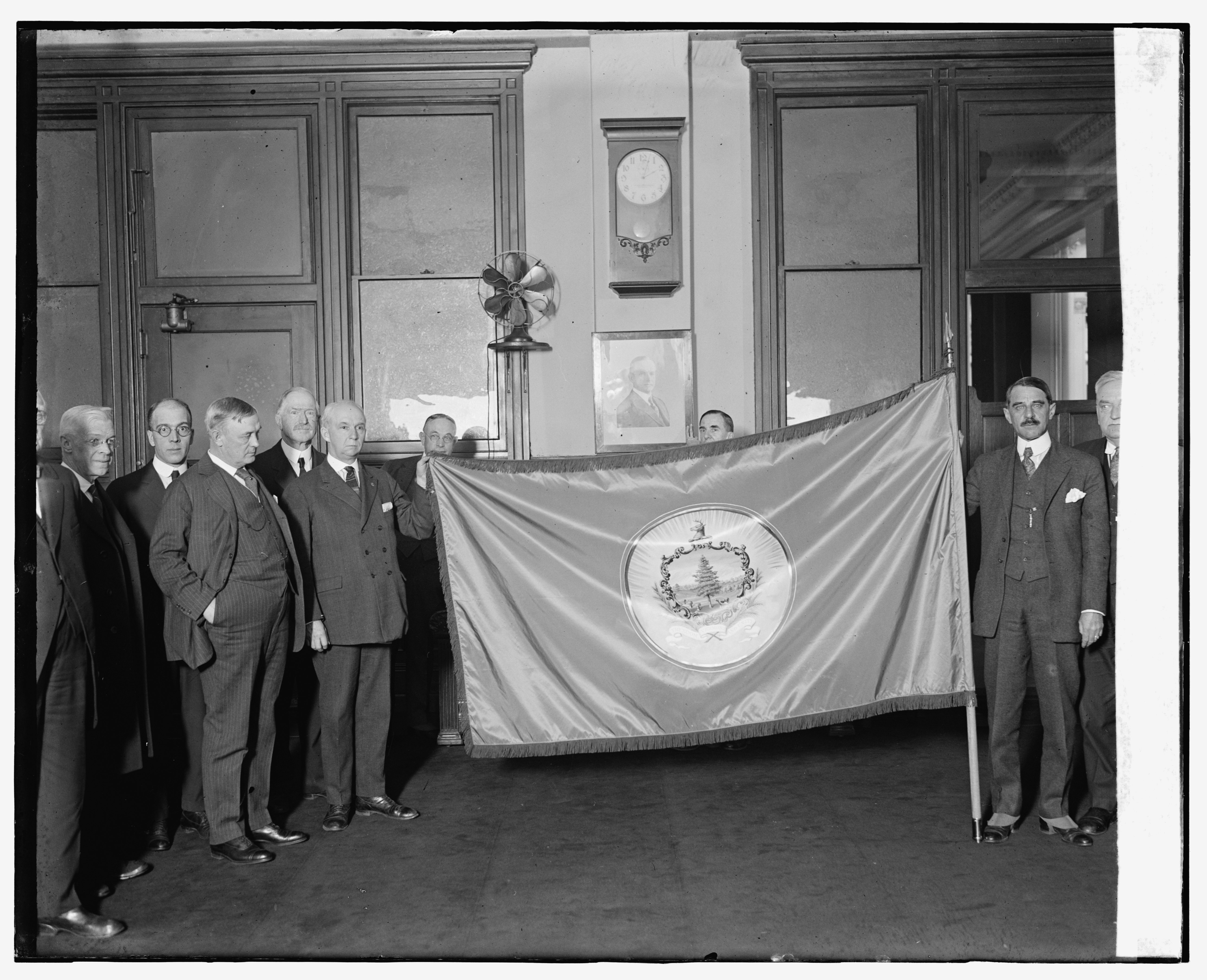
Presentation of the state flag at unknown event. March 21, 1924

During the American Civil War, the Spanish–American War and World War I, the Vermont militia fought under a banner composed of the coat of arms of Vermont surrounded by a white circle with a gold, blue and white outline on a blue field. This was essentially the same as the Vermont governor's flag which would later become the current state flag.

Because of confusion between the striped Vermont state flag and the U.S. flag, the design of the Vermont governor's flag was adopted as the official state flag on June 1, 1923.

== Other flags ==
Flag of the Vermont 27th Infantry used during the Mexican-American War (1847-1848) as described by a Veteran of the regiment

Vermont Centennial Flag, c1891

During the Mexican-American War Vermont sent troops that carried similar flags to the second state flag but with the name of the regiment on it. One of the flags was described as: "It is of silk, the regular thirteen stripes, but in the place of the field of stars in the coat of arms of Vermont, in a five pointed star. Beneath runs the motto, "Freedom and Unity," and on the sides of the star is emblazoned "27th Regiment."

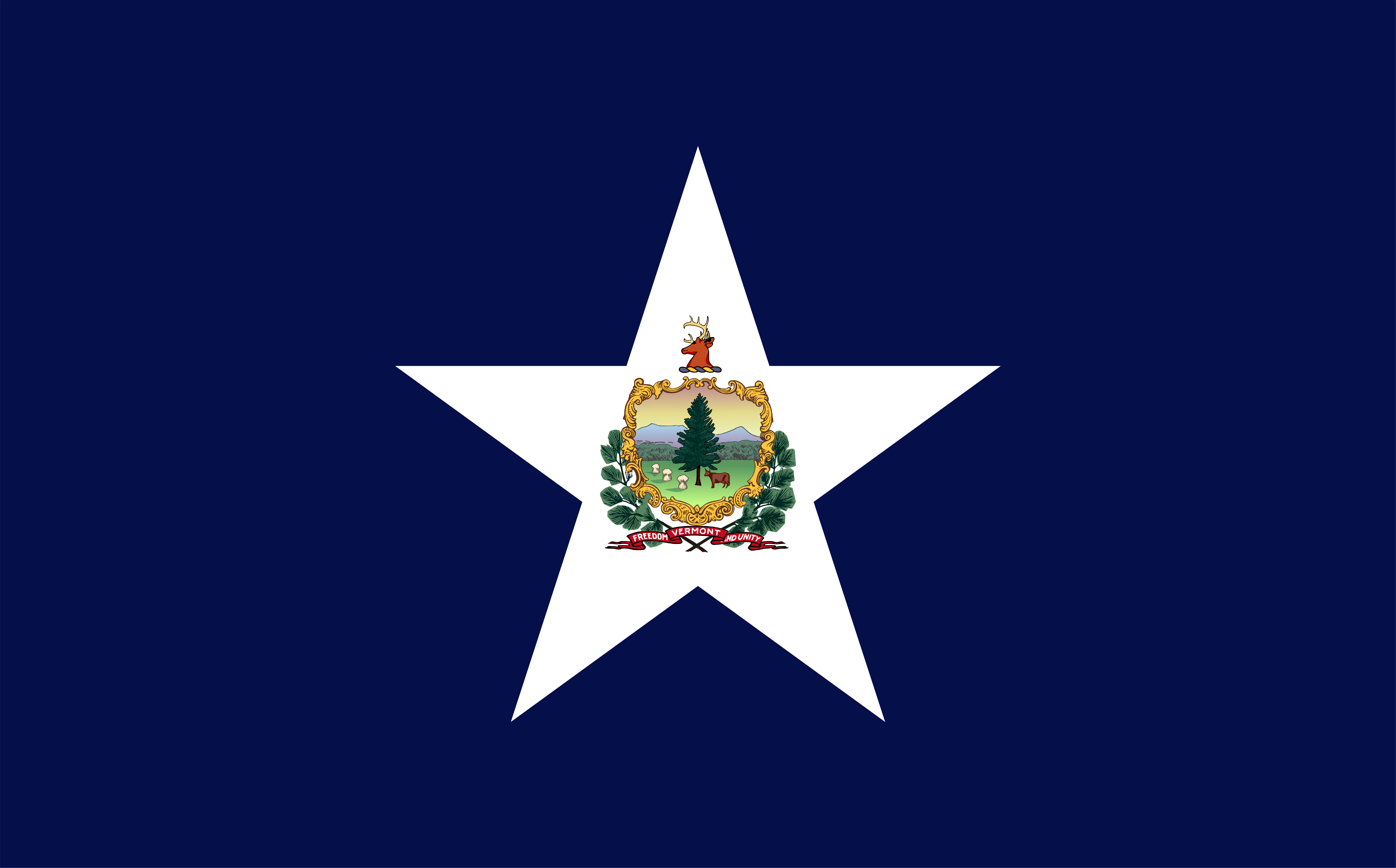
Variant of the state flag, described by The Lamoille news, 1878

According to The Lamoille news in 1878 there was a variant of the second state flag that was flown over the state house. It that had a dark blue field containing a star in the middle with the state's coat of arms in the center of it.

In June of 1916, the 2nd Vermont Cavalry were given a regimental flag. It contained plain field of yellow with the state coat of arms in the middle.

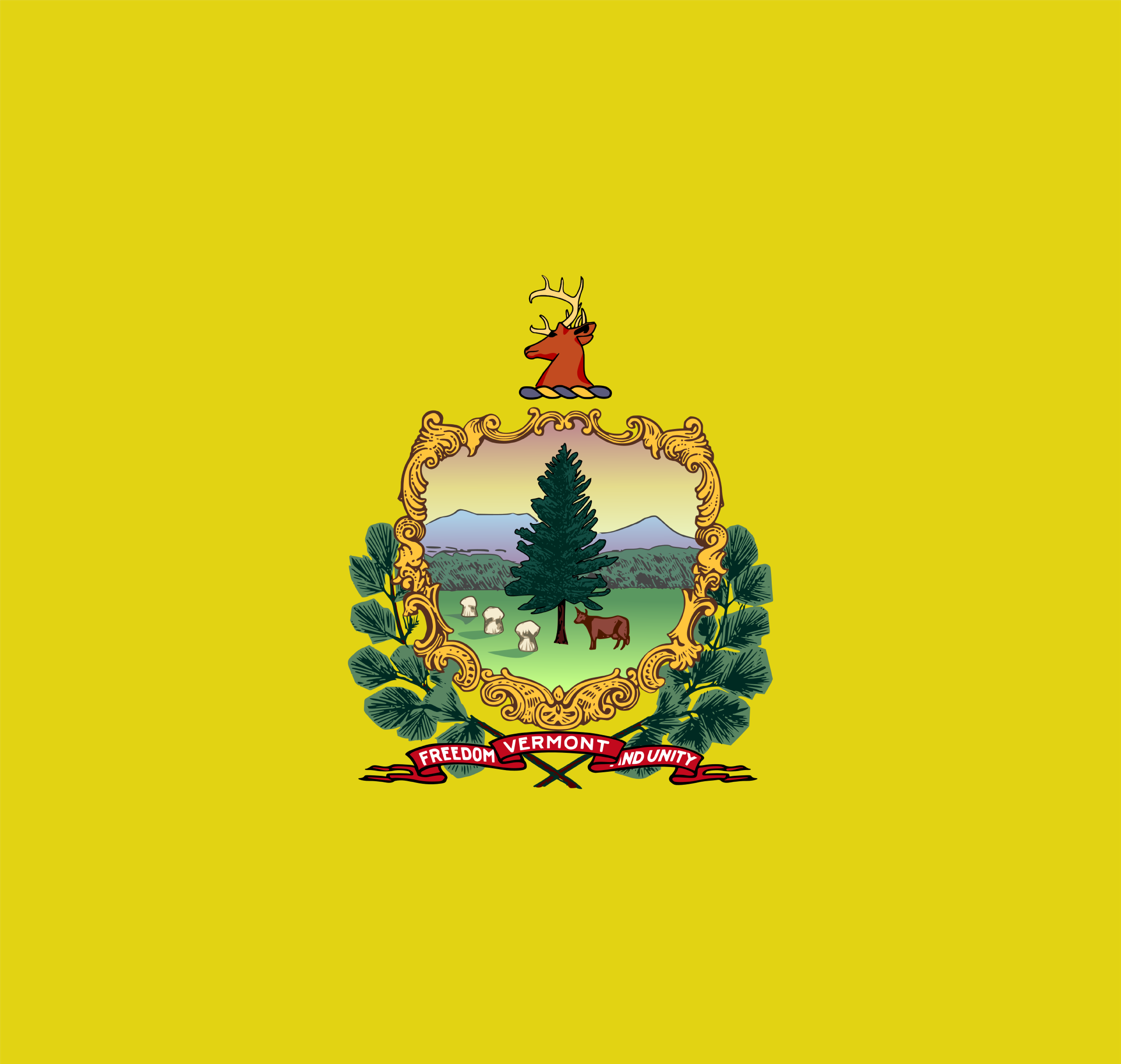
Flag of the 2nd Vermont Cavalry, 1916

== Gallery ==
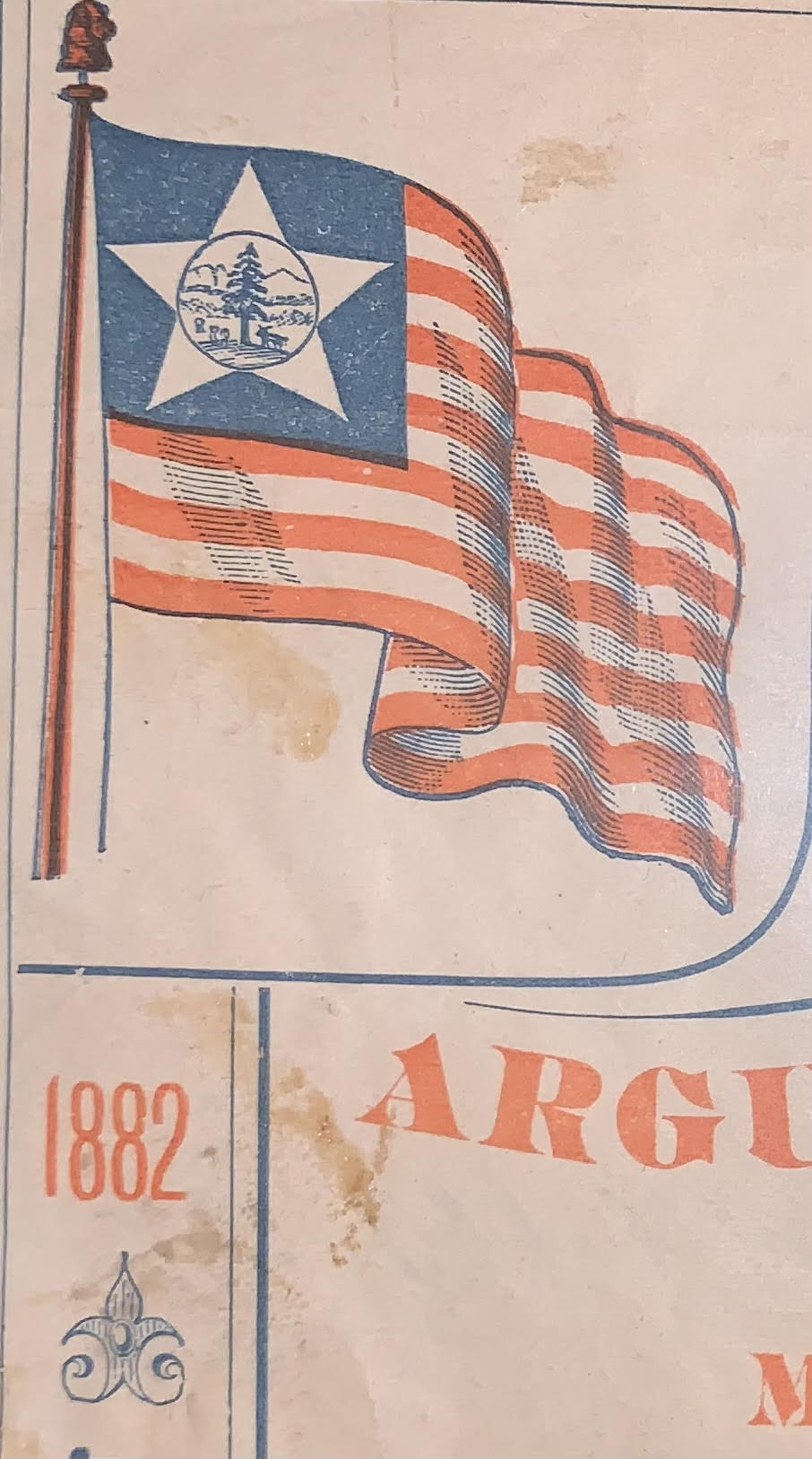
Illustration of the state flag from 1882

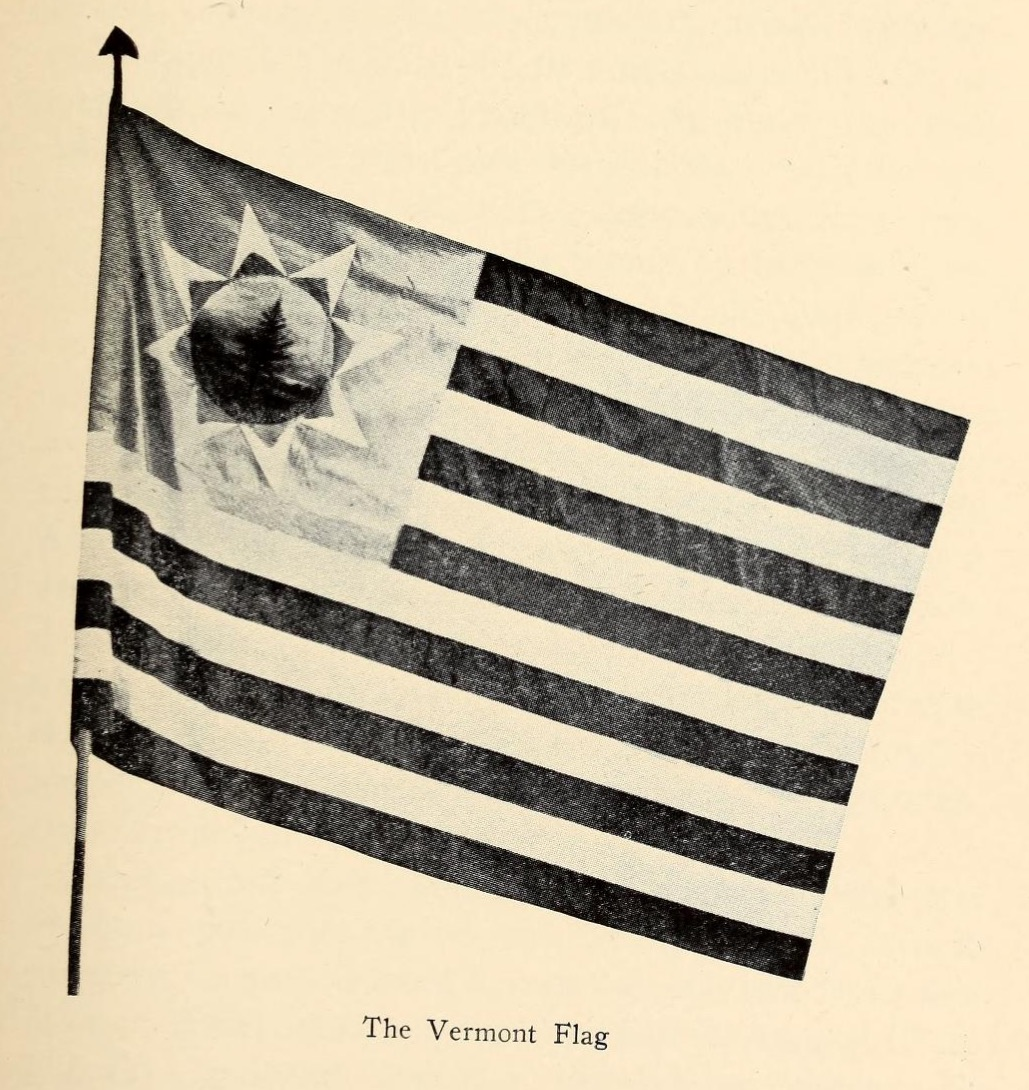
Black and white photograph of Vermont's second official flag

Early rendition of the current flag seen in the early 1920s

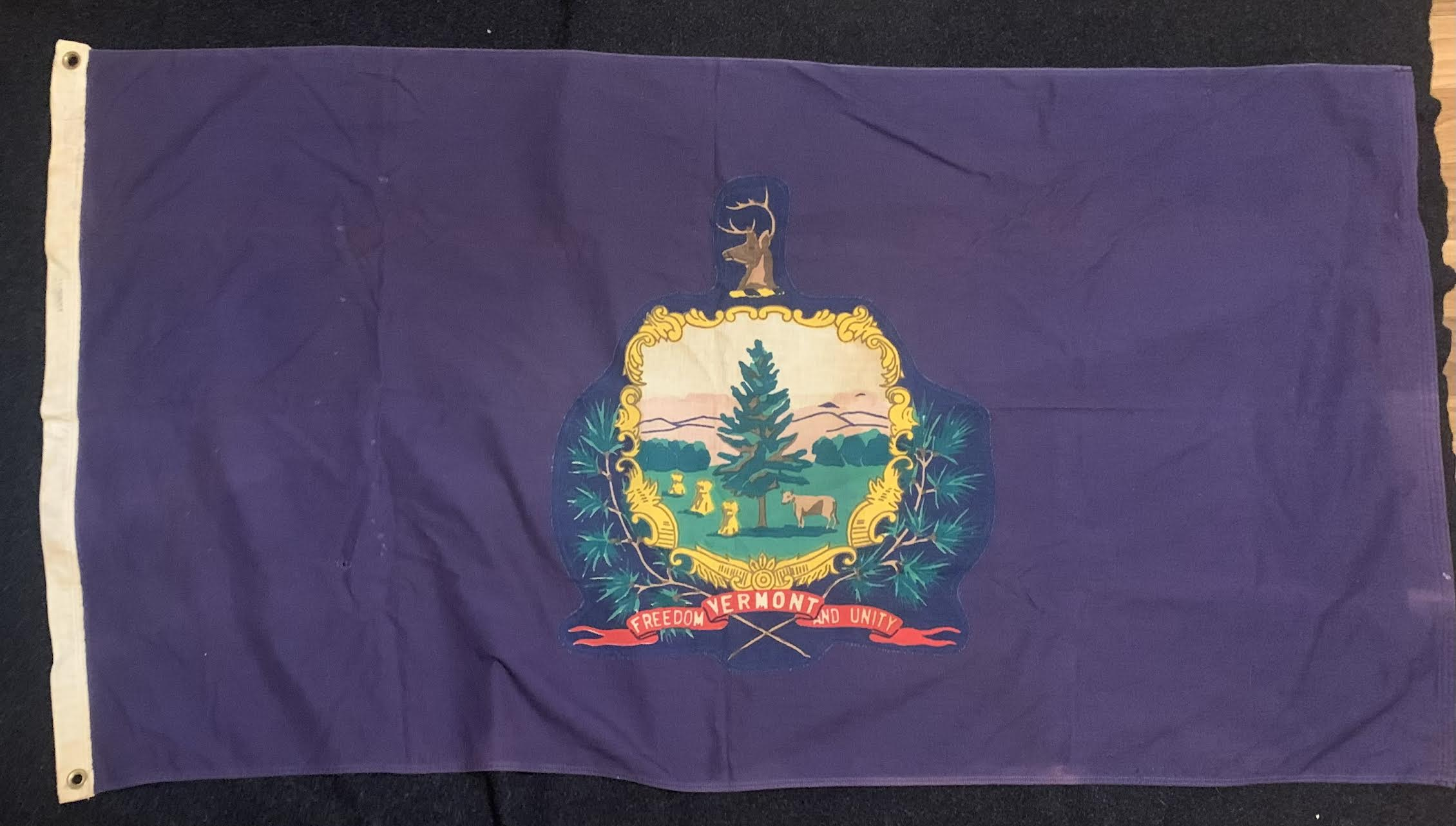
Vintage state flag

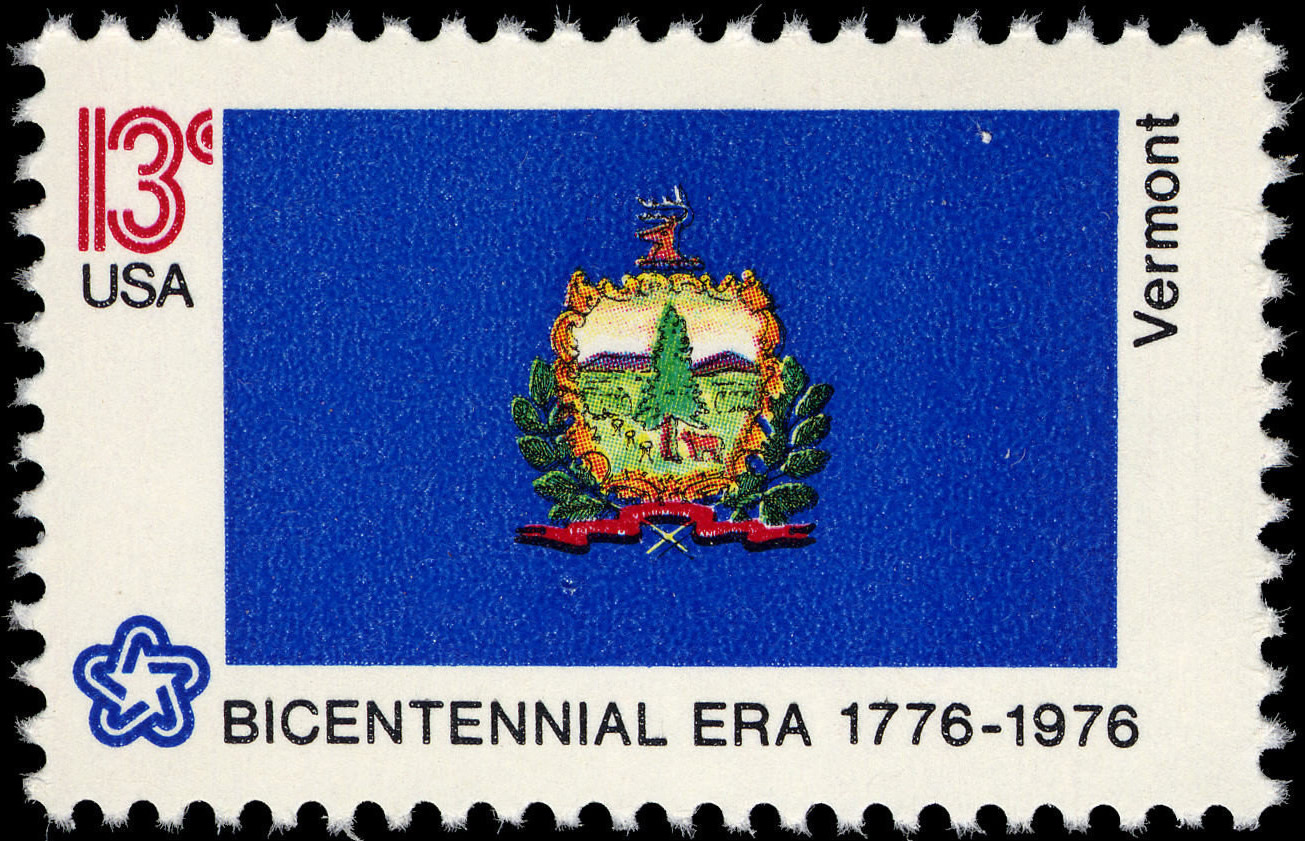
The Vermont state flag as depicted in the 1976 bicentennial postage stamp series

== See also ==
- State of Vermont
  - Symbols of the State of Vermont
    - Great Seal of the State of Vermont
- Flags of the United States
