= Bennington flag =

Version of the American flag

Digital reproduction of the Bennington flag

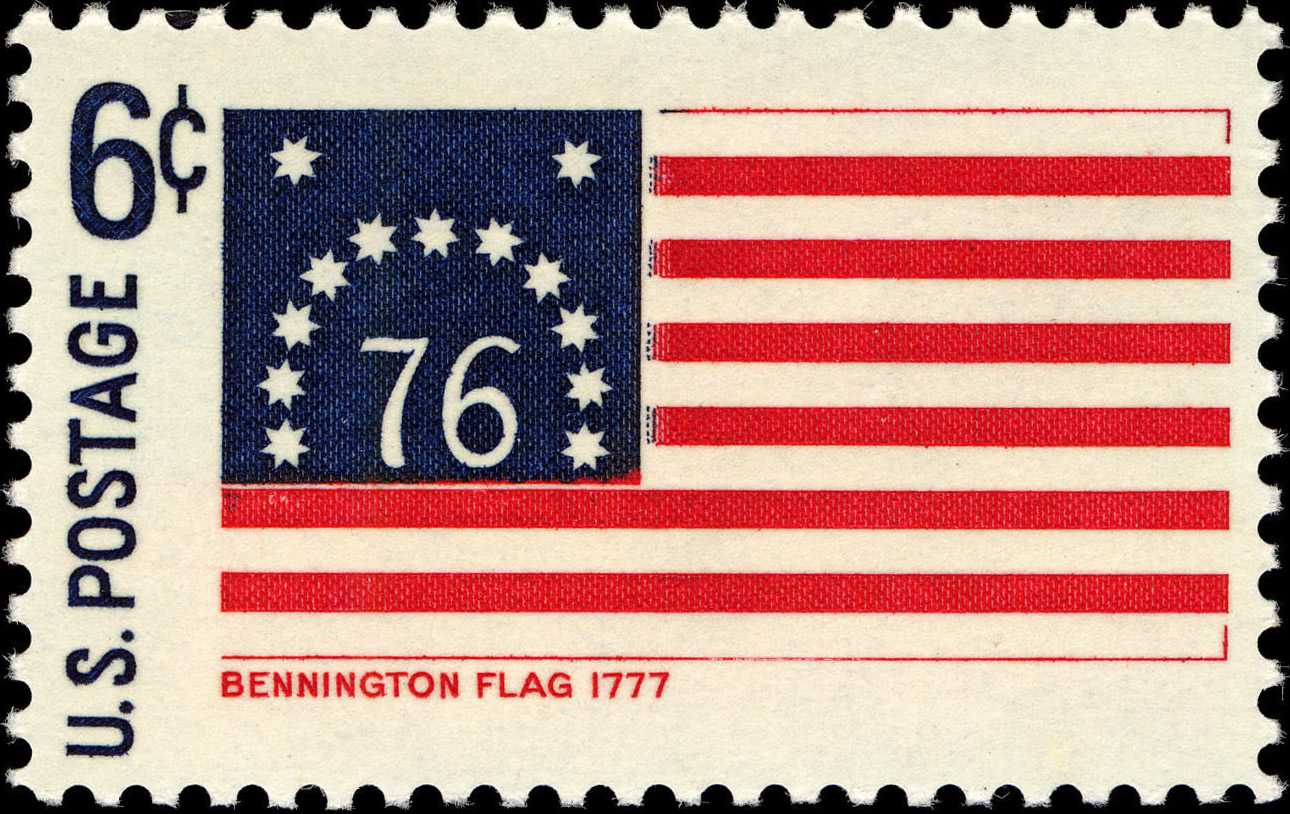
The Bennington flag as depicted in the 1968 "Historic Flag" stamp series.

The Bennington flag is a version of the U.S. flag associated with the American Revolution Battle of Bennington, from which it derives its name. Its distinguishing feature is the inclusion of a large '76' in the canton, a reference to the year 1776 when the Declaration of Independence was signed.

== Description ==
Like many Revolutionary War-era flags, the Bennington features 13 stars and 13 stripes, symbolic of the 13 North American colonies that were in a state of rebellion against Great Britain. The Bennington version is easily identified by a large '76' in the canton, recalling the year 1776, when the Declaration of Independence was signed. Another distinctive feature of the Bennington flag is the arrangement of the 13 stripes, with white being outermost (rather than red being outermost as in most U.S. flags). Also, its stars have seven points each (instead of the now-standard five points) and the blue canton is taller than on other flags, spanning nine instead of seven of the thirteen stripes.

The Bennington flag is a popular variant of the U.S. flag, and many historic flag dealers carry it. The large '76' makes it easily identifiable as banner from the American Revolution, evoking Spirit of '76 nostalgia.

== History ==
One legend claims that the original Bennington flag, which is 65.5 by 115 inches (1.66 by 2.92 m), was carried off the field by Nathaniel Fillmore and passed down through the Fillmore family, and was, at one time, in the possession of President Millard Fillmore, Nathaniel's grandson. Philetus P. Fillmore flew a Bennington flag in 1877, to commemorate the Battle of Bennington. Mrs. Maude Fillmore Wilson donated the family flag to the Bennington Museum. Because of the family association, the flag is also referred to as the "Fillmore flag".

Many doubt the actual use of the Fillmore flag at the Battle of Bennington. A Green Mountain Boys flag belonging to John Stark is generally accepted to have been there, but the Bennington flag has become more strongly associated with the event. Both Stark's flag and the Fillmore flag are held in a collection at the Bennington Museum, but the Stark flag is accepted as an 18th-century regimental banner, while the museum has dated the Bennington flag from the 19th century based on the nature of the machine-woven fabric it is made from. The flag may have been made to evoke revolutionary sentiment during the War of 1812 (fought against the United Kingdom), or to celebrate the 50th anniversary of the Declaration of Independence in 1826. The curator of textiles in the Smithsonian Institution's National Museum of History and Technology speculated that the flag may even have been a centennial banner, made c. 1876.

== Gallery ==
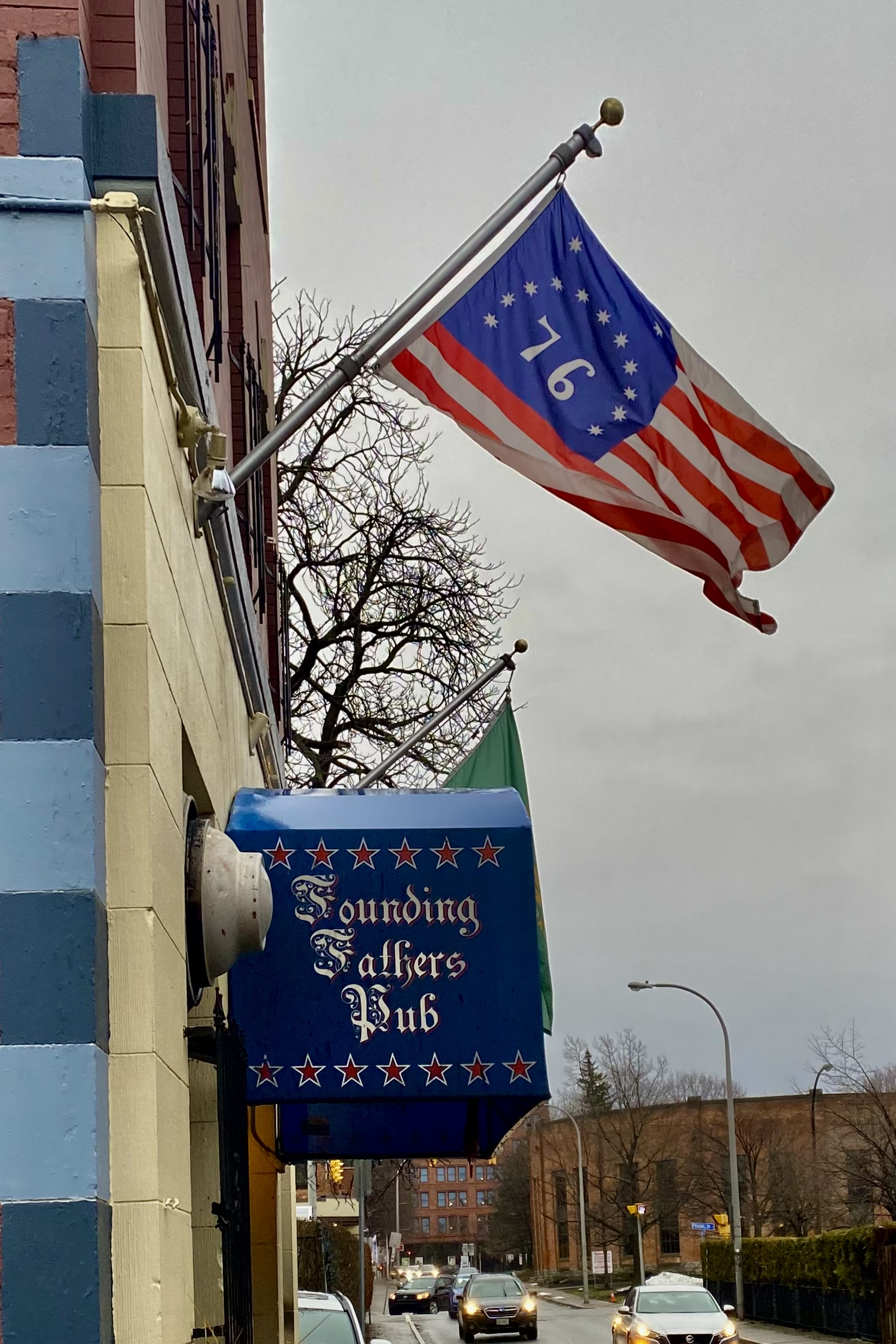
A replica of the flag flying in Buffalo, New York

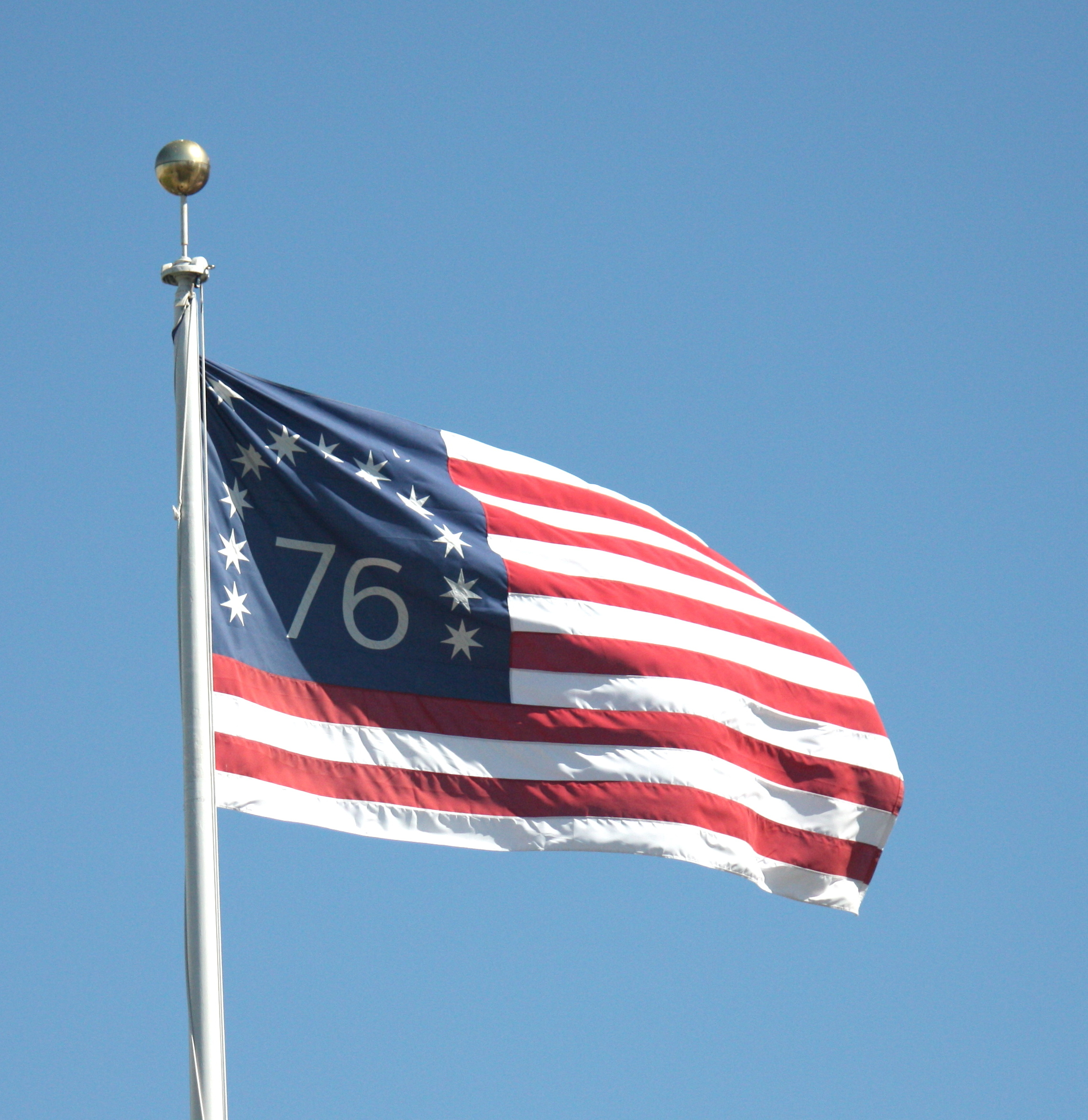
Bennington flag flying outside San Francisco City Hall, in San Francisco, California

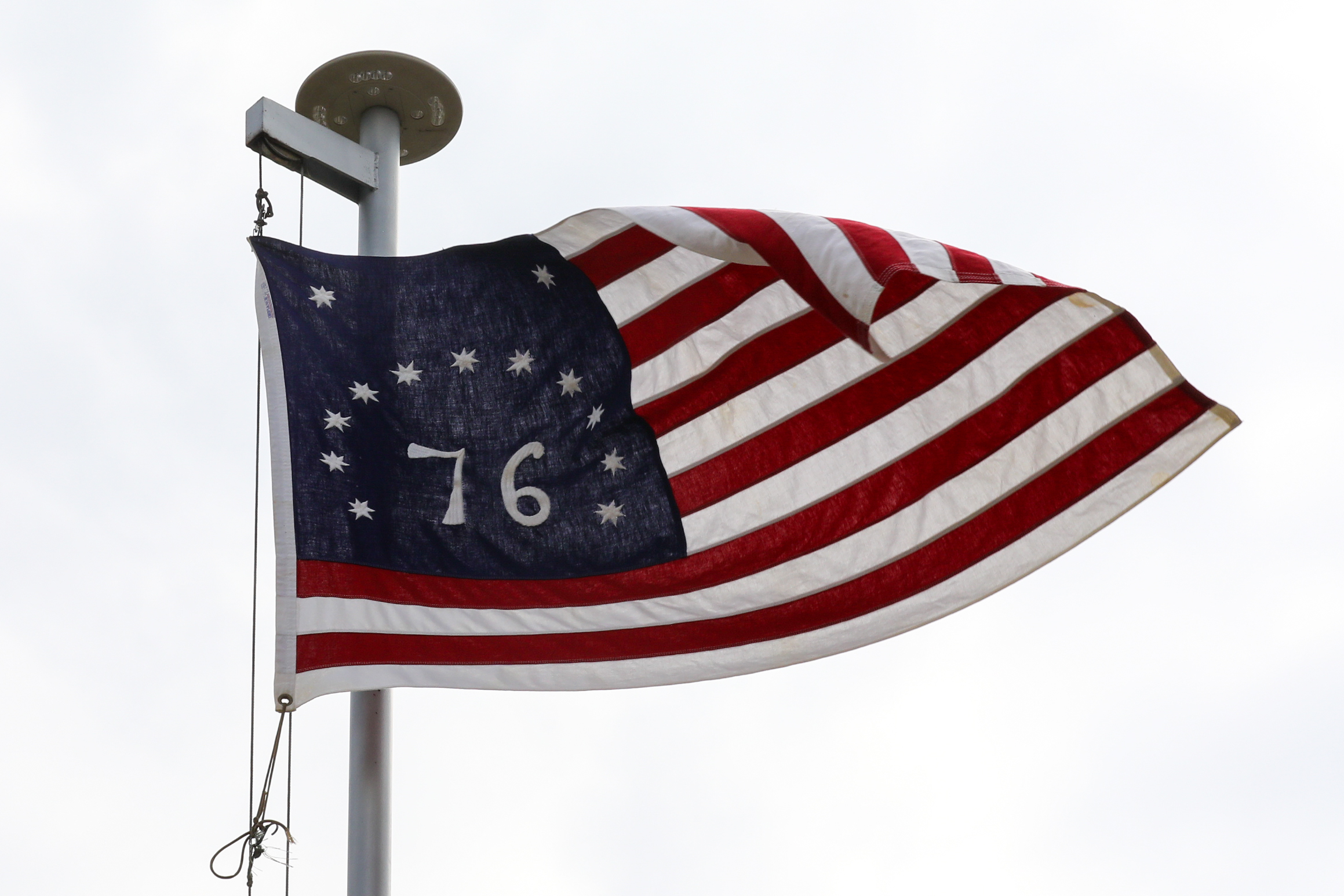
Bennington flag flying at Camp Nothing Hill, Kosovo, August 31, 2022
