= Freedom and Unity =

Official motto of the United States state of Vermont

The Great Seal of Vermont, designed by Ira Allen, prominently features Vermont's motto "Freedom & Unity".

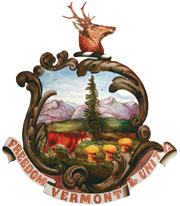
The motto Freedom and Unity in a stained glass window depicting the Vermont coat of arms.

"Freedom and Unity" is the official motto of the U.S. state of Vermont. The motto was first adopted in 1788 for use on the Great Seal of the Vermont Republic. Ira Allen designed the Vermont seal and is often credited as its author. Allen's 1798 book The Natural and Political History of the State of Vermont cites many contributions by him to Vermont's founding but does not claim credit for the motto. Following Vermont's admission to the federal union in 1791, the legislature once more approved the use of the motto for the new state seal. Vermont's first governor, Thomas Chittenden, cited the state motto in his epitaph: "Out of storm and manifold perils rose an enduring state, the home of freedom and unity.

== Meaning ==
There is general agreement that Vermont's motto is about the idea of balancing two seemingly opposite ideals: the personal freedom and independence of the individual citizen, with the common good of the larger community. Writer and Vermont resident Dorothy Canfield Fisher (1879–1958) wrote the following about her adopted state: "the Vermont idea grapples energetically with the basic problem of human conduct – how to reconcile the needs of the group, of which every man or woman is a member, with the craving for individual freedom to be what he really is."

These two forces have mostly endured in Vermont's history, both freedom, and unity, expressing distinct parts of the Vermont identity. Vermont's motto is believed to have been the inspiration for Daniel Webster's famous Liberty and Union speech before the United States Senate. Use of the exact motto is found in two quite different political groups. The left-center Social Democratic Party of Germany used the motto Freedom and Unity before World War II. In the United Kingdom, a right-center party, the English Democratic Party (not to be confused with the similarly named English Democrats Party) which seeks protection of English culture and opposing European unity, also uses the exact motto. The current national motto of Germany, adopted by the Federal Republic of Germany in 1952, is also quite similar, "Einigkeit und Recht und Freiheit" translating as "Unity and Justice and Freedom". The coat of arms of the Swiss canton of Vaud reads "Liberté et Patrie" - freedom and fatherland.

== Uses and applications ==
By Vermont statute the motto Freedom and Unity is applied to the Great Seal, coat of arms, and flag of Vermont. The motto can be found above the central doors of the Vermont Supreme Court, and above the rostrum in Representatives Hall at the Vermont State House.

Dean Roy, a 14-year-old teenager running for governor in Vermont, has founded a political party named the "Freedom and Unity Party".

== Tanzania ==
Tanzania's official motto is the Swahili phrase Uhuru na Umoja, which translates as "Freedom and Unity".

== See also ==
- "Stella quarta decima fulgeat", the state's official Latin motto
