= Vermont Military Crest =

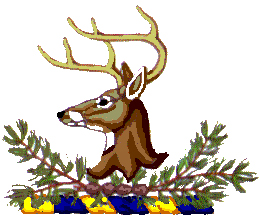
The Vermont Military Crest once used by Vermont's state military regiments is now used by the Vermont National Guard, the image gave reason for the nickname "Vermont Bucks" for Vermont's militiamen in the U.S. Civil War.

The Vermont Military Crest was first used in the coats of arms of units of Vermont state regiments, and later by the Vermont National Guard, as granted by the precursor organizations of what is now the United States Army Institute of Heraldry. The official Institute of Heraldry blazon describes the crest as follows: "A buck's head erased within a garland of pine branches all proper." The pine badge is also called a Vermonters badge, and was worn by citizens as a symbol of Vermont identity during the period of the Vermont Republic, by Vermont's military regiments at the Battle of Plattsburg, and through the U.S. Civil War. The crest is based upon the crest found on the coat of arms of Vermont. The design of the Vermont military crest is the source of the nickname for Vermont National Guard officers and enlistees, both male and female, as "Vermont Bucks."
