= Flag of the Green Mountain Boys =

Regimental colours from the American Revolutionary War

Green Mountain Boys flag
- Use: Civil and war flag
- Proportion: Approx. 2:3
- Adopted: Circa 1776
- Design: Green field with a blue canton containing 13 white stars in a "natural pattern"

The Green Mountain Boys flag, also known as the Stark flag, is a reconstruction of a regimental flag commonly stated to have been used by the Green Mountain Boys. The flag of the Green Mountain Boys has also been associated with the Vermont Republic. A remnant of a similar-looking flag, originally belonging to John Stark, is owned by the Bennington Museum. It still exists as one of the few regimental flags from the American Revolution. Although Stark was at the Battle of Bennington and likely flew this flag, the battle has become more commonly associated with the Bennington flag, which is believed to be a 19th-century banner. Widely popular with residents of contemporary Vermont, the flag's unusual appearance with randomly placed stars and a bright green field is popularly flown and depicted on stickers, shirts and other items as a symbol of the stubbornly independent spirit of Vermont.

Today the flag is used as the regimental flag of the Vermont National Guard unit. The regimental flag, known also as a "battle flag" or war flag, accompanies the unit on battle assignments and is physically handed to the commander of the regiment, as described by former Vermont National Guard Adjutant General Martha Rainville in an interview. Proposals have been considered to change the state flag of Vermont back to the flag of the Green Mountain Boys' design, but none have succeeded.

== Design ==
The common reconstruction consists of a green field and a constellation of thirteen five-pointed white stars representing the thirteen colonies arranged in a natural pattern within an azure canton. The existing fragments of Stark’s flag consist of the canton from the flag, which has remnants of green silk on three sides, and a piece of green cloth with flourish from elsewhere on the flag.

Surviving canton of Stark’s flag, now held at the Bennington Museum.

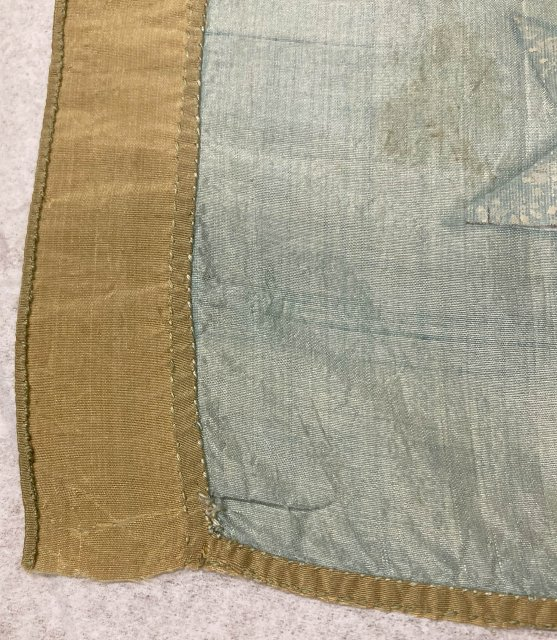
Close up of the surviving canton.

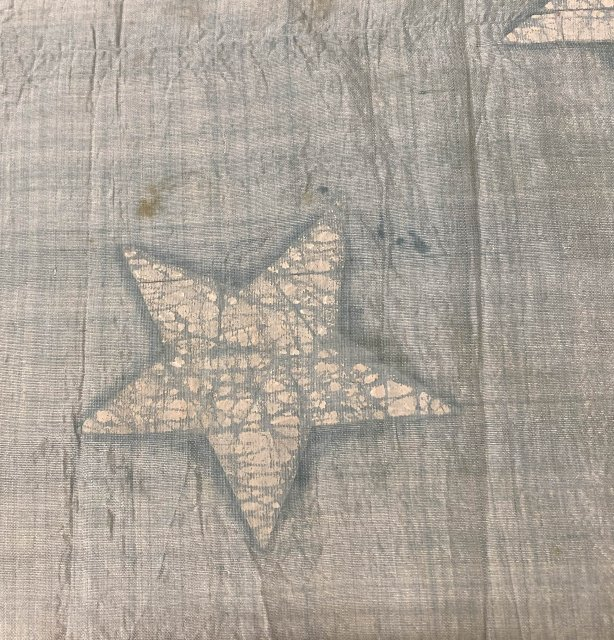
Close up of a star of the surviving canton.

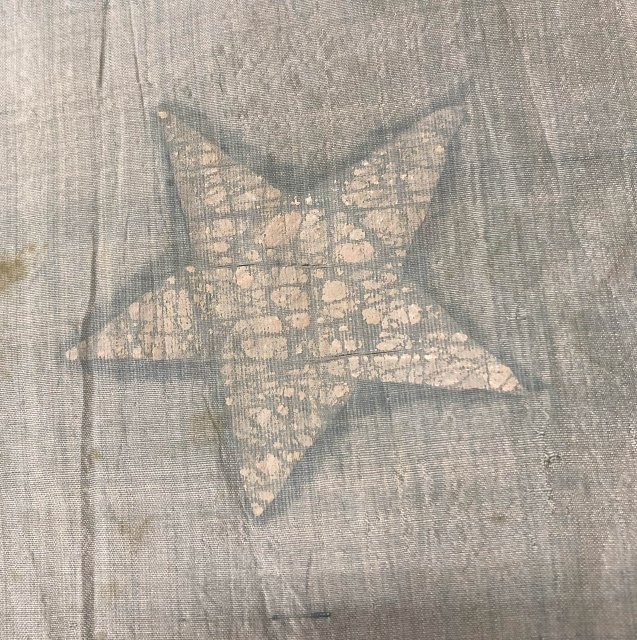
Another close up of a star of the surviving canton.

Common reproduction of the flag of the Green Mountain Boys.

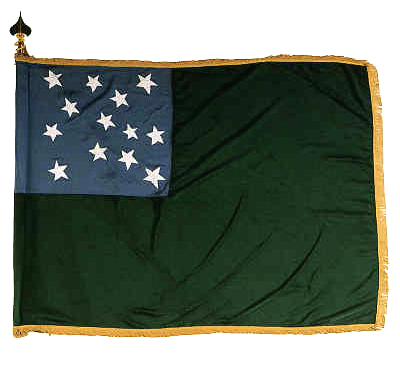
A modern replica of the flag.

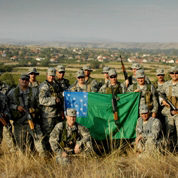
A Vermont National Guard unit displaying the flag while abroad.

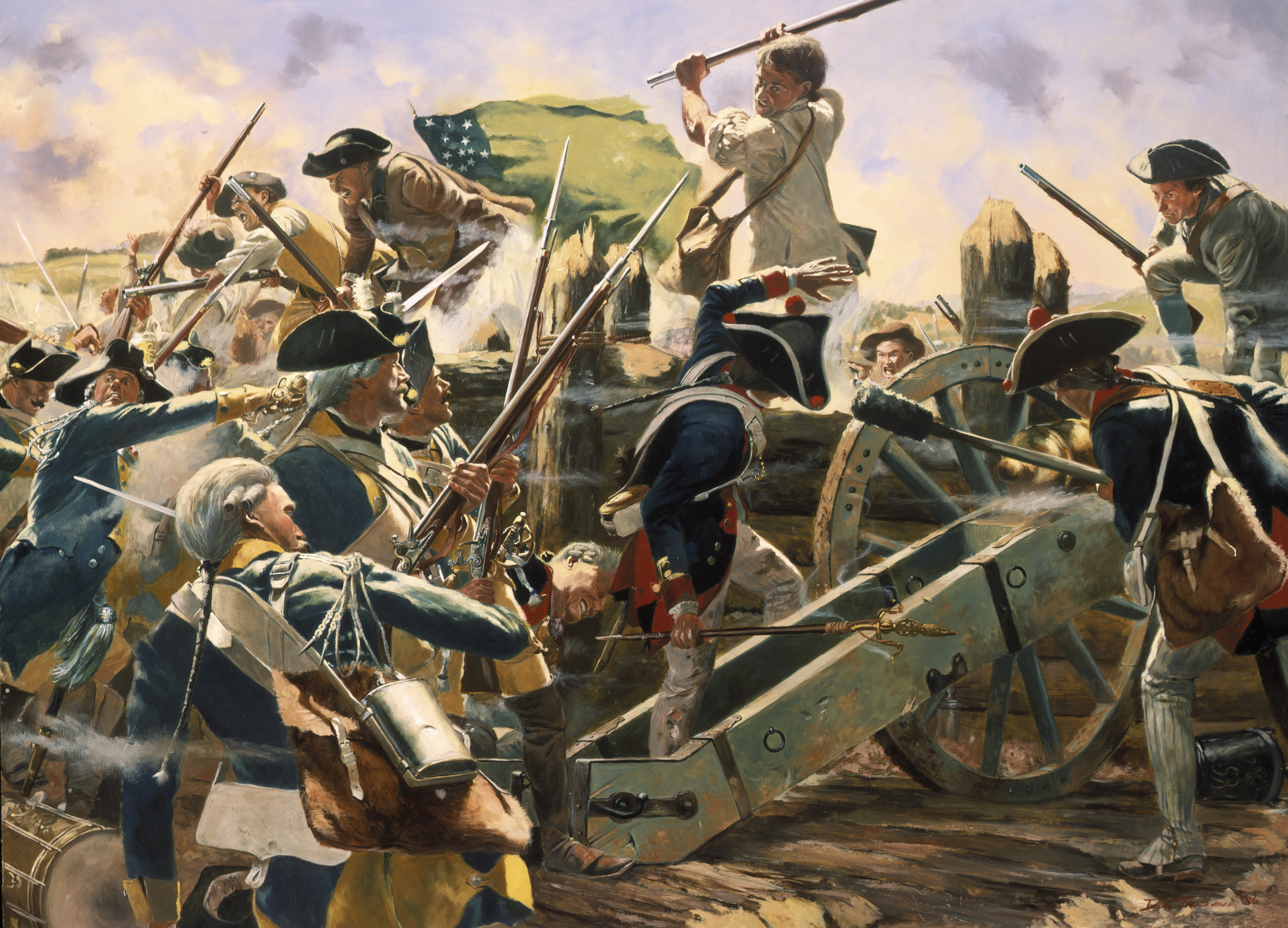
The flag depicted in "The Battle of Bennington" painting by Don Troiani.

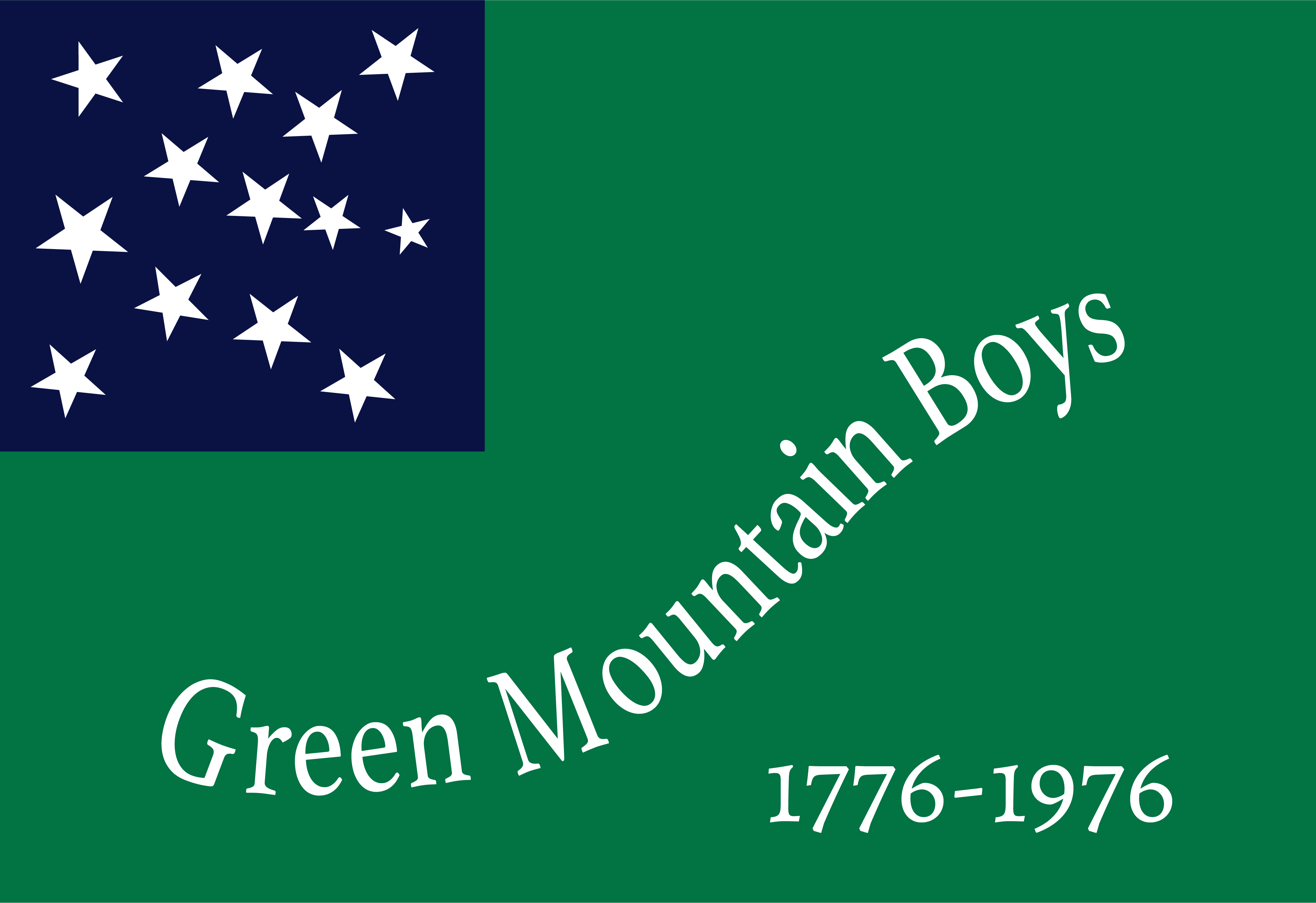
The flag from the 1976 Bicentennial

== See also ==
- Green Mountain Boys
- Vermont Republic
- Flag of Vermont
