= Kirkpatrick Sale =

American author (born 1937)

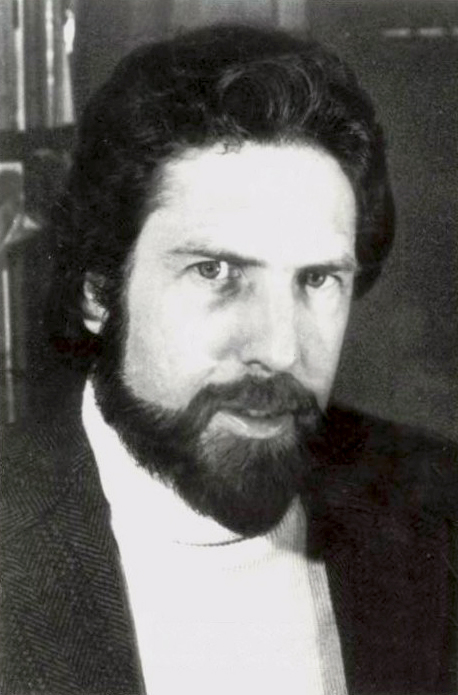
- Sale in 1980
- Born: June 27, 1937 (age 89); Ithaca, New York, U.S.
- Education: Cornell University (BA)
- Occupation: Author
- Spouse: Faith Apfelbaum (m. 1958; died 1999)

Kirkpatrick Sale (born June 27, 1937) is an American author who has written prolifically about political decentralism, environmentalism, luddism and technology. He has been described as having a "philosophy unified by decentralism" and as being "a leader of the neo-Luddites," an "anti-globalization leftist," and "the theoretician for a new secessionist movement."

== Early life and education ==
Sale grew up in Ithaca, New York, where he later said he "spent most of my first twenty years there, and that has made an imprint on me—on my philosophy, social attitudes, certainly on my politics—that has lasted powerfully for the rest of my life." Sale's brother, Roger Sale, was a literary critic and a professor of English at the University of Washington.

He graduated from Cornell University, majoring in English and history, in 1958.

He served as associate editor and editor-in-chief of the student-owned and managed newspaper, The Cornell Daily Sun. Sale was one of the leaders of the May 23, 1958, protest against university policies forbidding male and female students fraternizing and its in loco parentis policy. Sale and his friend and roommate Richard Fariña, and three others, were charged by Cornell. The protest was described in Fariña's 1966 novel, Been Down So Long It Looks Like Up to Me. In 1958 he collaborated with Thomas Pynchon on an unproduced futuristic musical called Minstrel Island.

== Career ==
Sale worked initially in journalism for the leftist journal New Leader, "a magazine founded in 1924 in part by socialists Norman Thomas and Eugene Debs," and The New York Times Magazine, before becoming a freelance journalist. He spent time in Ghana and wrote his first book about it. His second book, SDS, was about the radical 1960s group Students for a Democratic Society. The book "is still considered one of the best sources on the youth activist organization that helped define 1960s radicalism."

In 1968, he signed the "Writers and Editors War Tax Protest" pledge, vowing to refuse tax payments in protest against the Vietnam War. Subsequent books explored radical decentralism, bioregionalism, environmentalism, the Luddites and similar themes. He "has been a regular contributor to progressive magazines like Mother Jones and The Nation for the better part of his writing career".

Sale donated 16 boxes of materials—typescripts, galley proofs, correspondence, etc.—for each one of his books to the archives at Cornell University, where they are available for public inspection.

== Views ==
=== History ===
In his 1990 book, The Conquest of Paradise: Christopher Columbus and the Columbian Legacy, Sale argued that Christopher Columbus was an imperialist bent on conquest from his first voyage. In a New York Times book review, historian and member of the Christopher Columbus Quincentenary Jubilee Committee William Hardy McNeill wrote about Sale: "he has set out to destroy the heroic image that earlier writers have transmitted to us. Mr. Sale makes Columbus out to be cruel, greedy and incompetent (even as a sailor), and a man who was perversely intent on abusing the natural paradise on which he intruded." However, McNeill also declared Sale's work to be "unhistorical, in the sense that [it] selects from the often cloudy record of Columbus's actual motives and deeds what suits the researcher's 20th-century purposes." In McNeill's opinion, Columbus' advocates and detractors present a "sort of history [that] caricatures the complexity of human reality by turning Columbus into either a bloody ogre or a plaster saint, as the case may be."

Gaddis Smith of the Council on Foreign Relations journal Foreign Affairs described Sale as "no apologist for the old Northeast," but added "he attributes many of the nation's recent problems to the ascendance of the values and politicians of the region lying south of a line from San Francisco to the Virginia-North Carolina boundary."

=== Technology ===
Sale "has written extensively and skeptically about technology," and has said he is "a great admirer" of anarcho-primitivist John Zerzan. He has described personal computers as "the devil's work" and in the past opened personal appearances by smashing one. During promotion of his 1995 book Rebels Against the Future: The Luddites and Their War on the Industrial Revolution, Sale debated with Newsweek magazine senior editor and technology columnist Steven Levy "about the relative merits of the communications age".

Sale has a comprehensive knowledge of what is called the American Songbook (Tin Pan Alley, Broadway, and movie tunes 1910–1960) and was active in the folk revival of the 1960s with Peter Yarrow, Pete Seeger, and the Clancy Brothers, but has said that he does not "care much for" pop music after that era. For example, "he once heard a 'racket' in a nightclub during his left activist days in the 1960s from some 'young man' everyone told him was a 'big deal.' That 'young man' turned out to be Bob Dylan." Kirk recalls that "he'd never heard anything so awful in his life."

In 1995, Sale agreed to a public bet with Kevin Kelly that by the year 2020, there would be a convergence of three disasters: global currency collapse, significant warfare between rich and poor, and environmental disasters of some significant size. The bet was turned into a claim on the FX prediction market, where the probability has hovered around 25%. Sale and Kelly agreed that William Patrick would be the judge of the outcome. Patrick stated that Kelly had won the bet. Sale then initially refused to acknowledge the loss, and did not pay the $1000 that had been previously agreed, but a year after the resolution of the bet Sale changed his mind and agreed to pay $2000.

=== Secession ===
Sale has been described as "one of the intellectual godfathers of the secessionist movement." He argues that the major theme of contemporary history, from the dissolution of the Soviet Union to the expansion of United Nations membership from 51 in 1945 to 193 nations today, is the breakup of great empires. Some on both left and right call for smaller, less powerful government.

In 2004, Sale and members of the Second Vermont Republic formed the Middlebury Institute which is dedicated to the study of separatism, secession, and self-determination. Sale is director of the institute. In 2006, Middlebury sponsored the First North American Secessionist Convention, which attracted 40 participants from 16 secessionist organizations and was described as the first gathering of secessionists since the American Civil War. Delegates issued a statement of principles of secession which they presented as the Burlington Declaration.

In October 2007, The New York Times interviewed Sale about the Second North American Secessionist Convention, co-hosted by the Middlebury Institute. Sale told the interviewer, "The virtue of small government is that the mistakes are small as well." He went on to say, "If you want to leave a nation you think is corrupt, inefficient, militaristic, oppressive, repressive, but you don't want to move to Canada or France, what do you do? Well, the way is through secession, where you could stay home and be where you want to be." The convention received worldwide media attention.

The convention's other co-sponsor, the League of the South, has been designated a hate group by the Southern Poverty Law Center since 2000. According to Sale, "They call everybody racists. There are, no doubt, racists in the League of the South, and there are, no doubt, racists everywhere." The Southern Poverty Law Center later criticized The New York Times' October 2007 Peter Applebome interview of Sale for not covering its allegations.

Sale wrote the foreword to Thomas Naylor's 2008 book Secession: How Vermont and all the Other States Can Save Themselves from the Empire. Sale, Thomas Naylor and four others issued "The Montpelier Manifesto" in September, 2012.

== Personal life ==
After graduating from Cornell University in 1958, Sale married Faith Apfelbaum, who later worked as an editor with Thomas Pynchon, Kurt Vonnegut, Joseph Heller, and Amy Tan. Faith died in 1999. In 2019, Sale married his long-time partner Shirley Branchini in Mount Pleasant, South Carolina.

== Books ==
External videos
- Interview with Sale on The Fire of His Genius: Robert Fulton and the American Dream. Booknotes (November 25, 2001). C-SPAN.

- The Land and People of Ghana. Lippincott (1963)
- SDS: Ten Years Toward a Revolution. New York: Random House (1973). ISBN 0394478894. OCLC 1036846177.
  - Softcover edition. New York: Random House (1974). ISBN 978-0394478890.
- Power Shift: The Rise of the Southern Rim and Its Challenge to the Eastern Establishment. New York: Random House (1975).
- Human Scale. New York: Coward, McCann & Geoghegan (1980). ISBN 0698110137.
- Dwellers in the Land: The Bioregional Vision. San Francisco, Calif.: Sierra Club Books (1985). ISBN 0871568470.
- Conquest of Paradise: Christopher Columbus and the Columbian Legacy. New York: Knopf (1990).
- Green Revolution: The American Environmental Movement, 1962-1992. New York: Hill and Wang (1993). ISBN 978-0809052189.
- Rebels Against the Future: The Luddites and Their War on the Industrial Revolution: Lessons for the Computer Age. Boston, Mas.: Addison Wesley (1995). ISBN 0201626780.
- Why the Sea Is Salt: Poems of Love and Loss. San Jose, Calif.: Writers Club Press (2001). ISBN 978-0595176403.
- Fire of His Genius: Robert Fulton and the American Dream. Los Angeles, Calif.: Free Press (2001). ISBN 978-0684867151.
- After Eden: The Evolution of Human Domination. Duke University Press (2006). ISBN 978-0822339380.
- Emancipation Hell: The Tragedy Wrought by the Emancipation Proclamation 150 Years Ago. Sale (2012). ISBN 978-1480285224.
- Human Scale Revisited. Chelsea Green (2017).
- Collapse of 2020. Outskirts Press (2020).
- No More Mushrooms: Thoughts on Life Without Government. Autonomedia (2021).

=== Book contributions ===
- "Self-Sufficiency." In: Buying America Back, edited by Jonathan Greenberg and William Kistler. Tulsa, Okla.: Council Oak Books (1992), pp. 555-567.
