= Thomas Naylor =

American economist and founder of the Second Vermont Republic

- Born: Thomas Herbert Naylor; May 30, 1936; Jackson, Mississippi, U.S.
- Died: December 12, 2012 (aged 76); Burlington, Vermont, U.S.
- Resting place: Grand View Cemetery, Charlotte, Vermont, U.S.
- Occupations: Economist and professor
- Spouse: Magdalena R. Naylor
- Children: Alexander Naylor

Thomas Herbert Naylor (May 30, 1936 – December 12, 2012) was an American economist and professor. From Jackson, Mississippi, he was a professor emeritus of economics at Duke University, the author of thirty books, and a founder of the Second Vermont Republic (2003). Naylor authored ten academic books and three books advocating secession.

== Biography ==
Naylor was the son of T. H. Naylor Jr. who he described as a prominent Mississippi racist whose views he himself rejected. He graduated from Central High School. He then graduated from Millsaps College with a Bachelor of Science in 1958 and a second one from Columbia University in Industrial Engineering in 1959. He received a master's degree in business from Indiana University School of Business in 1961 and a Doctor of Philosophy in Economics from Tulane University in 1964. He began his career at Duke University as an assistant professor of economics in 1964, teaching economics, management science, and computer science, ending his career there in 1993. He also served as a visiting professor at the University of Wisconsin, Middlebury College and the University of Vermont.

During the 1970s Naylor was president of a 50-person computer software firm with Fortune 500 clients worldwide. He also was an international management consultant advising major corporations and governments in over thirty countries. He left business and turned to political analysis after trips to the Soviet Union in the 1980s which led him to publicly predicted future political changes there.

His articles appeared in The New York Times, International Herald Tribune, Los Angeles Times, Christian Science Monitor, The Nation, and Business Week. He has made appearances on major American television networks as well as CNN, Fox News, BBC and National Public Radio.

Naylor moved to Vermont in 1990 with his wife, Magdalena R. Naylor, M.D. who has worked as a psychiatrist and an associate professor at the University of Vermont. They have a son, Alexander Naylor.

== Second Vermont Republic activism ==
In 1997, Naylor published with William H. Willimon Downsizing the U.S.A., which called for Vermont independence. In 2003 he self-published The Vermont Manifesto. Naylor was spurred to create SVR by the September 11 attacks, writing in his manifesto "Our nation has truly lost its way. America is no longer a sustainable nation-state economically, politically, socially, militarily or environmentally. The Empire has no clothes." Vermont's Bread and Puppet Theater, a group that uses puppets to promote far-left politics, were early supporters. Naylor began informal meetings of the Second Vermont Republic, holding the first statewide meeting in October 2003.

In 2004, Kirkpatrick Sale recommended that Naylor sponsor the "Radical Consultation" meeting initiated by John Papworth, editor of the Fourth World Review in England. The consultation attracted various grass roots secessionist groups in Middlebury, Vermont, which resulted in the creation of the Middlebury Institute. He was mentioned prominently in reporting of the secessionist conferences of many of the same groups in 2006 in Burlington, Vermont.

According to Kirkpatrick Sale, Naylor "tended to stress what I came to call the Push reasons for secession—that is, it allows a state to get out from under an inept, dysfunctional, and evil empire so as not to go down with its inevitable collapse, and it frees it from the taxes, wars, regulations, and entangling alliances of that empire."

In 2007, Naylor was criticized when it was alleged that some advisory board members had affiliations with Neo-Confederate groups, such as the League of the South (LOS). Thomas Naylor told The Vermont Guardian that the organization has no direct link to LOS, except a link on the SVR website, and that SVR is not racist. He told a radio audience: "The SPLC is a well-known McCarthy-style group of mercenaries who routinely engage in ideological smear campaigns on behalf of their wealthy techno-fascist clowns. It's all about money, power, and greed." In 2009 SPLC criticized Naylor for agreeing to speak at the 2010 Abbeville Institute secessionist conference called "State Nullification, Secession and the Human Scale of Political Order." Naylor continued to criticize SPLC, especially for ignoring what he alleged to be the United States government's racism.

In May 2008, Feral House published Thomas Naylor's book Secession: How Vermont and all the Other States Can Save Themselves from the Empire. Author Kirkpatrick Sale wrote the foreword. Professor Walter E. Williams of George Mason University writes it is a "serious examination of our God given right of self governance and that right's implication for secession. Dr. Naylor has made a persuasive case of the identical response to today's 'train of abuses' that led the Founders to secede from King George's tyranny."

In January 2010, nine Vermonters announced they were planning to run for governor, lieutenant governor and seven seats in the state Senate on a Vermont secession platform. Lieutenant Governor candidate Peter Garritano said the idea to run came during a meeting two months before with Thomas Naylor. After the candidates were labeled a "Green Tea Party" in a Huffington Post article, Naylor disagreed, saying "While tea partiers think the system's fixable, the secessionists believe America has become ungovernable — and that Vermont must break away from 'the empire' to survive."

In January 2011, Time magazine named Second Vermont Republic one of the "Top 10 Aspiring Nations," mentioning Naylor as its founder. Naylor, Kirkpatrick Sale and four others issued "The Montpelier Manifesto" in September 2012.

== Death and legacy ==
Naylor died on December 12, 2012, in Burlington, Vermont, at the age of 76, a few days after suffering a stroke. In a Duke University Department of Economics obituary Professor Roy Weintraub was quoted as saying: "When I came to Duke's Department of Economics in 1970, Tom Naylor was the force for growth and change in the Department. His civil rights work, his insistence on the role of econometrics in the program, and his enormous energy were all part of his encouraging the younger faculty members to participate in changing the departmental mood. And his parties, with rock bands, jazz groups, and like-minded people from all over the university and the larger community, were memorable."

Rob Williams, a long-time friend and publisher of "Vermont Commons" said of Naylor "The idea of Vermont independence has really rooted itself and Thomas deserves a lot of credit for that." Seven Days called him a "tireless advocate for secession" and detailed his activist style. WCAX-TV in Burlington wrote that he was the "man who led the fight for Vermont to become an independent nation." Kirkpatrick Sale wrote in an obituary that Naylor's urging was partially responsible for Sale's sponsoring three national congresses of secessionist organization from around the country, thus "putting the movement on the map", and for initiating a 2013 conference on small nations.

== Partial bibliography ==
Academic books

- Microeconomics and Decision Models of the Firm (with John Vernon). New York: Harcourt, Brace, and World, 1969. Translated into Spanish.
- You Can't Eat Magnolias (editor with H. Brandt Ayers). New York: McGraw-Hill, 1972.
- Strategies for Change in the South (with James Clotfelter). Chapel Hill, North Carolina: University of North Carolina Press, 1975.
- Corporate Planning Models. Reading, Massachusetts: Addison-Wesley, 1979.
- Simulation Models in Corporate Planning (editor). New York: Praeger Press, 1979,
- Managerial Economics: Corporate Economics and Strategy (with John M. Vernon and Kenneth Wertz). New York: McGraw-Hill, 1983.
- The Corporate Strategy Matrix. New York: Basic Books, 1986. Translated into Hungarian.
- The Gorbachev Strategy: Opening the Closed Society. Lexington, Massachusetts: Lexington Books, 1988.
- The Cold War Legacy. Lexington, Massachusetts: Lexington Books, 1991.
- The Abandoned Generation: Rethinking Higher Education (with William H. Willimon). Grand Rapids, Michigan: Wm. B. Eerdmans Publishing, 1995.
- Affluenza: How Overconsumption Is Killing Us--and How to Fight Back, 3rd Edition (with John De Graaf and David Wann, 2014), Berrett-Koehler Publishers, ISBN 9781609949273.

Books on secession

- Downsizing the USA (with William H. Willimon). Grand Rapids, Michigan: Wm. B. Eerdmans Publishing, 1997.
- The Vermont Manifesto: The Second Vermont Republic. Philadelphia, Pennsylvania: Xlibris, 2003.
- Secession: How Vermont and all the Other States Can Save Themselves from the Empire, foreword by Kirkpatrick Sale. Port Townsend, Washington: Feral House, 2008.
