= These Green Mountains =

Vermont state song

Song
- Released: May 22, 2000
- Genre: State Song
- Composer: Diane Martin

"These Green Mountains" is the official state song of Vermont.

== History ==
In 1998, the Vermont Legislature resolved to have the Vermont Arts Council establish a committee to find and recommend a new state song to replace "Hail to Vermont!". The committee subsequently solicited candidates and reviewed 107 songs, choosing eight songs as finalists. Following a solicitation of input from the Vermont public, "These Green Mountains" was put forth as their official recommendation.

The song was composed by Diane Martin and arranged by Rita Buglass-Gluck and was made official on May 22, 2000, when then-governor Howard Dean signed Act 99.

== Lyrics ==
These green hills and silver waters
are my home. They belong to me.
And to all of her sons and daughters
May they be strong and forever free.

Let us live to protect her beauty
And look with pride on the golden dome.
They say home is where the heart is
These green mountains are my home.

These green mountains are my home.
