= Hail, Vermont! =

"Hail, Vermont!" was the former state song of the U.S. state of Vermont. The song was written by Josephine Hovey Perry of Barre, Vermont, and was officially made the state song in 1938. The song was significant at its time of publication for mentioning Vermont's daughters as well as her sons. From the 1950s through the 1960s the song was given to Vermont school children in a soft-bound booklet titled Vermont Sings. On May 22, 2000, the song was replaced by "'These Green Mountains."'

Though not designated the official state song by legislative statute, "Hail Vermont!" was proclaimed the state song by Governor of Vermont George Aiken to be performed in the Vermont Pavilion at the 1939 New York World's Fair. The current state song, "These Green Mountains" became the official state song by passage of Act 99 of the Vermont General Assembly's 1999–2000 biennial session.

== Lyrics ==
Hail to Vermont!
Lovely Vermont!
Hail to Vermont so fearless!
Sing we a song!
Sing loud and long!
To our little state so peerless!
Green are her hills, Clear are her rills,
Fair are her lakes and rivers and valleys;
Blue are her skies, Peaceful she lies,
But when roused to a call she speedily rallies.

Hail to Vermont! Dear old Vermont!
Our love for you is great.
We cherish your name,
We laud! We acclaim!
Our own Green Mountain State.

Proud of Vermont, Lovely Vermont,
Proud of her charm and her beauty;
Proud of her name, Proud of her fame,
We're proud of her sense of duty;
Proud of her past, Proud first and last,
Proud of her lands and proud of her waters;
Her men are true. Her women, too.
We're proud of her sons and proud of her daughters.

Hail to Vermont! Dear old Vermont!
Our love for you is great.
We cherish your name,
We laud! We acclaim!
Our own Green Mountain State.

Animated-Flag-Vermont
