= Seal of Vermont =

Official government emblem of the U.S. state of Vermont

Great Seal of Vermont

Versions
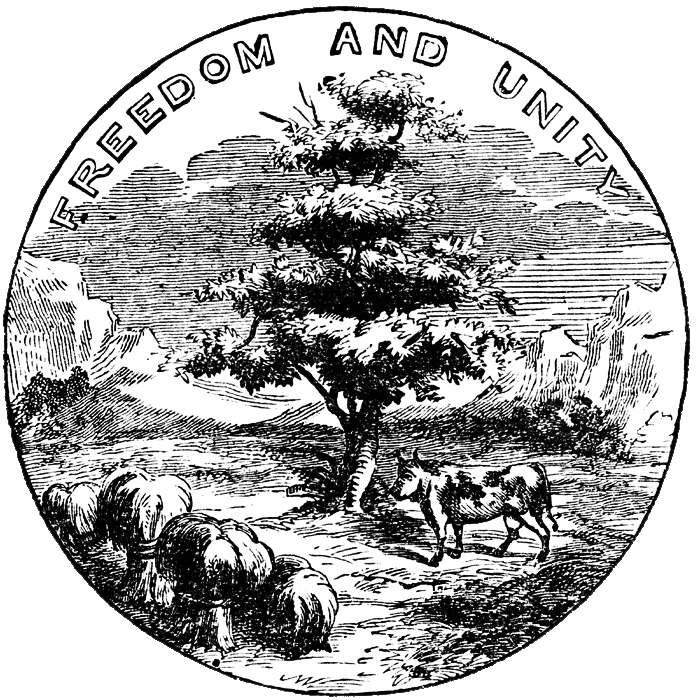
- An older version of the seal used before Ira Allen's rendition was restored in 1937.
- Armiger: State of Vermont
- Motto: Freedom & Unity

The Great Seal of the State of Vermont is the official seal of the U.S. state of Vermont, used to emboss and authenticate official documents. It was designed by Ira Allen, the brother of Ethan Allen and one of the state's founders.

== Great Seal ==
The seal, depicts a 14-branched pine tree rising from the forest, with a grain sheaf above. The 14 branches symbolize the Thirteen Colonies and Vermont as the 14th state admitted to the union. A cow on the right, representing Vermont's history of dairy farming, also appears. On the top of the seal are wavy lines, possibly suggesting clouds; on the bottom wavy lines suggest water. It is believed that the two sets of wavy lines might also suggest the Connecticut River and Lake Champlain, Vermont's east and west borders. The passage "Freedom & Unity"—Vermont's state motto—is centered below the state name. The motto is central to the Vermont ideal of balancing personal freedom with the individual's responsibility to their community. The seal was first used by the government of the independent Vermont Republic as it existed prior to admission to the Union.

Intended for use to emboss official documents, the seal is not intended for decorative use, the single exception being a large version carved in hardwood and affixed to the Vermont Pavilion at the Expo 67 World's Fair. That seal was later used as a backdrop behind the podium in the Vermont State House Press Briefing Room, which is now the minority party's caucus room. The large wooden Great Seal of Vermont has been moved to the working offices of the governor of Vermont at The Pavilion.

A more naturalistic and colorful armorial representation of the elements of the seal can be seen in the coat of arms of Vermont, which is found on the Vermont flag. It is also used on letterheads and on signs marking state buildings, bridges, state's borders, and at Vermont welcome centers. By Vermont statute, the Great Seal of Vermont is the shared domain of the Vermont Secretary of State, the offices of the state governorship, and the legislative and judiciary branches of government. The original metal dies for the first seal of Vermont are stored at the Secretary of State's office at Redstone, a large red brick and sandstone Queen Anne style house at Montpelier.

== Seals of the government of Vermont ==
There are various seals of the state government. Most use the coat of arms of Vermont.

Seal of the State Treasurer of Vermont

Seal of the State Auditor of Vermont

== See also ==
- Symbols of the State of Vermont
