= Stella quarta decima =

Vermont coin motto

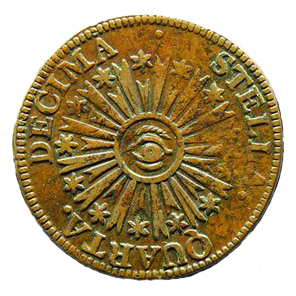
Vermont copper coinage with the motto STELLA QUARTA DECIMA.

Stella quarta decima (Latin for "The Fourteenth Star") is a motto appearing on Vermont copper coinage struck in 1785 and 1786. The coins were issued during the period when Vermont was an independent state (1777–1791), sometimes referred to as the Vermont Republic.

The motto appears on the reverse of the coin and encircles a corona of 13 small stars representing the existing U.S. states, with a large central star with an eye contained within. The motto expresses the then independent state's aspiration to join the United States as the fourteenth. The United States Congress admitted Vermont into the Union, as the fourteenth state, on March 4, 1791.

== Usage in Latin motto ==
On April 10, 2015, an extended version of the phrase, Stella quarta decima fulgeat, became the official state Latin motto when it was signed into law at the University of Vermont on Latin day by Peter Shumlin, the 81st governor of Vermont. The Latin words translate as "May the fourteenth star shine bright." It brought about some controversy and confusion, as some people misunderstood and believed the state had created a state motto for Latinos or confused Latin with Latin America. The author of the motto is Angela Kubicke, who was a ninth grader at the time of it going into effect. She submitted it to Joe Benning, her state senator and the senate's minority leader, who sponsored the bill to make it law.
