= Coat of arms of Vermont =

Official armorial bearings of the United States state of Vermont

Coat of arms of Vermont

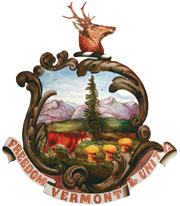
An arrangement of the coat of arms of Vermont can be found in this c. 1866 stained glass window created for the ceiling of the chamber of the U.S. House of Representatives in the U.S. Capitol. Following its removal in a 1950s renovation, it was given to the Vermont Historical Society.

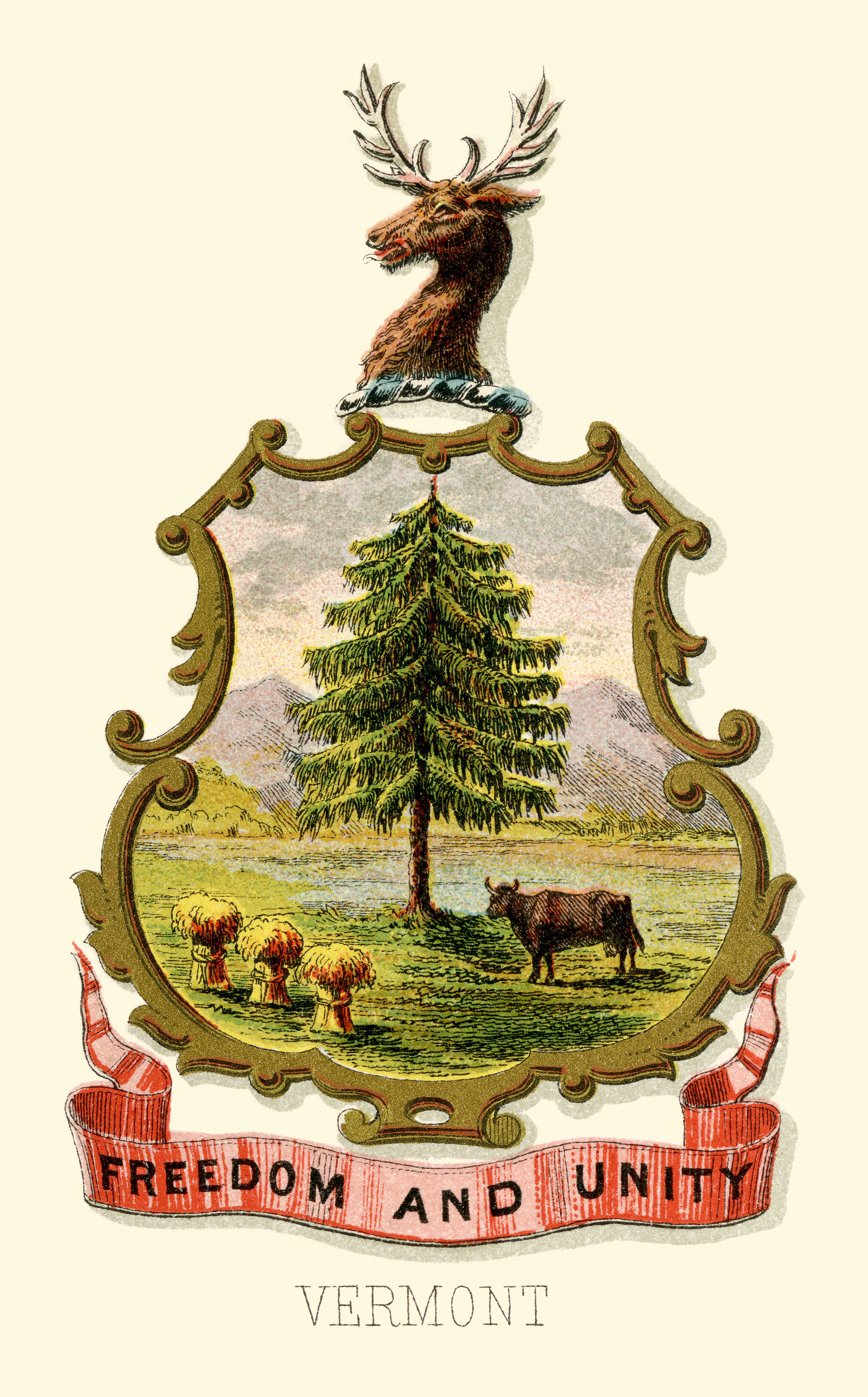
Vermont state historical coat of arms (illustrated, 1876)

The coat of arms of Vermont is the official armorial bearings of the U.S. state of Vermont. Most of the elements found in the coat of arms originate in the Great Seal of Vermont designed by Ira Allen. Whereas the Great Seal of Vermont is reproduced in a single color and is reserved for embossing and authenticating state documents, the coat of arms is a more naturalistic and colorful representation of many of the same elements. The coat of arms of Vermont was first used in 1807 on $5 banknotes of the Vermont State Bank. One of these notes is in the special collections of the Vermont History Center in Barre, Vermont. Prior to the discovery of the 1807 banknotes, the earliest representation of the coat of arms of Vermont was found on an engraved 1821 state military commissions. The exact designer is not known, but it is likely that then Secretary of State Robert Temple worked with an engraver in developing the arms. Considerable liberties were taken in early depictions of the coat of arms. The location of the cow and the sheaves (bundles of cereal grains) moved about the foreground, and the height of the pine tree and size of the buck's head also varied. A state statute was approved in 1840, and modified in 1862, both attempts to codify and create more consistent representation of the arms. The coat of arms was cast in brass to ornament uniforms of Vermont's military regiments before, and through the U.S. Civil War, when individual states raised and trained their own regiments.

Today, incorrect emblazonments of the coat of arms appears on the current flag of Vermont, above the rostrum in the Hall of Representatives at the Vermont State House, on state court buildings, stationery, signage marking the Vermont border, and at Vermont Welcome Centers.

The blazon was formalized and described by state statute in 1840 in the following manner: "the coat of arms of the state shall be, and is described as follows: Green, a landscape occupying half of the shield; on the right and left, in the background, high mountains, blue; the sky yellow. From near the base, and reaching nearly to the top of the shield, arises a pine-tree of the natural color, and between three erect sheaves, yellow, placed bendwise on the dexter side, and a red cow standing on the sinister side of the field. The Crest: A buck's head, of the natural color, cut off and placed on a scroll, blue and yellow. The Motto and Badge: On a scroll beneath the shield, the motto: Vermont: Freedom and Unity. The Vermonter's Badge: two pine branches of natural color, crossed between the shield and scroll." The crest and Vermonter's Badge can also be seen, in modified form, on the Vermont Military Crest. The depiction of the shield on the flag, and other similar emblazonments, however, are incorrect, as in blazon the initial tincture (colour) mentioned when describing the shield is that of the background or "field," and the next tincture describes the colour of everything on the shield; the shield should therefore be shown with a green background completely hidden by everything on it, and a blue landscape.

The "Vermonter's Badge" described in the statute was worn as an expression of Vermont identity by citizens during the period of the Vermont Republic, and again during the American Civil War by Vermont's military regiments. The motto Freedom and Unity is central to the Vermont ideal of balancing personal freedom with the individual's responsibility to their community.

== Seals of the government of Vermont ==
Many government seals of Vermont use the state's coat of arms.

Seal of the State Treasurer of Vermont

Seal of the State Auditor of Vermont

== See also ==
- Coats of arms of the U.S. states
- Seal of Vermont
