= Vermont Republic =

Unrecognized republic in North America from 1777 to 1791

Coordinates: 44°N 72.7°W

State of Vermont État du Vermont (French)
- 1777–1791
- Great Seal
- Motto: Freedom and Unity (on Great Seal); Stella quarta decima (English: the fourteenth star; on Vermont coinage)
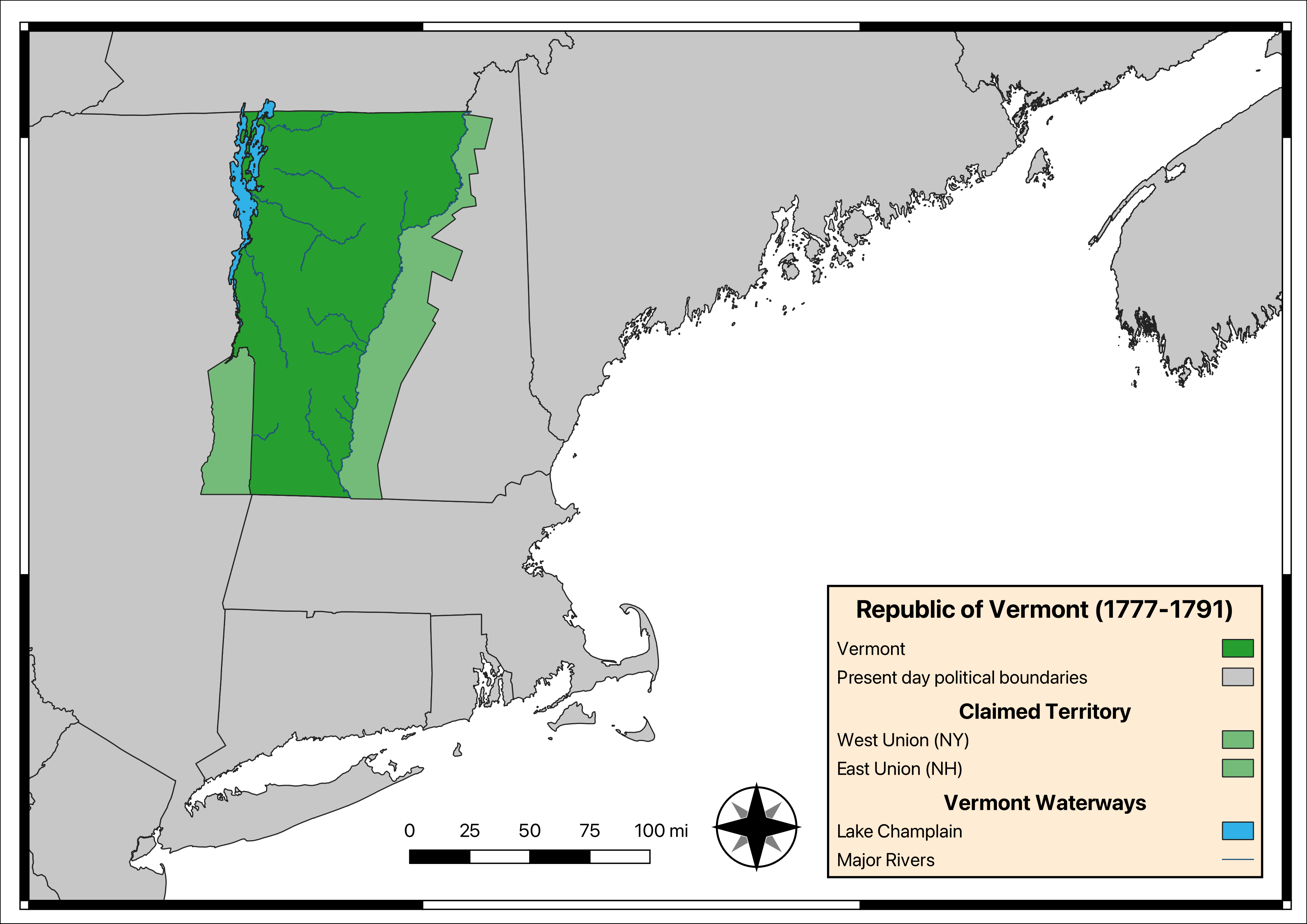
- The Republic of Vermont, 1777-1791. (Note: Brief claims to adjacent townships in New Hampshire and New York were made in 1781 as East Union and West Union counties respectively, but they were never formally annexed and Vermont rescinded the claims in 1782.)
- Capital: Westminster (1777); Windsor (1777–1784); Castleton (1784–1791)
- Common languages: English; French
- Demonym: Vermonter
- Government: Republic with executive governor
- Governor
  - 1778–1789: Thomas Chittenden
  - 1789–1790: Moses Robinson
  - 1790–1791: Thomas Chittenden (Note: Left office to become US state governor.)
- Legislature: House of Representatives of the Freemen of Vermont
- Historical era: Early modern period
  - Independence: January 15, 1777
  - Admission to the Union with the United States: March 4, 1791
- Currency: Vermont copper
Preceded by
New York
New Hampshire
Quebec
New Hampshire Grants
Succeeded by
Vermont
- Today part of: Vermont

The Vermont Republic, officially known at the time as the State of Vermont, was a de facto, unrecognized independent state in New England that existed from January 15, 1777, to March 4, 1791. The state was founded in January 1777, when delegates from 28 towns met and declared independence from the jurisdictions and land claims of the British colonies of Quebec, New Hampshire, and New York. The republic remained in existence for the next fourteen years, albeit without diplomatic recognition from any foreign power. On March 4, 1791, it was admitted into the United States as the State of Vermont, with the constitution and laws of the independent state continuing in effect after admission.

The delegates forbade adult slavery within their republic, although the Vermont constitution continued to make allowances for the enslavement of men under the age of 21 and women under the age of 18. Many Vermonters took part in the American Revolution on the side of the Revolution, but the Continental Congress did not recognize the independence of Vermont (then also known as the New Hampshire Grants) due to objections from New York, which had conflicting property claims. In a response to this, members representing Vermont conducted negotiations to join the Province of Quebec, which were accepted by the British, who offered generous terms for the republic's reunion. Following the Franco-American victory at the siege of Yorktown in 1781, however, American independence became apparent. Vermont, later bordered on three sides by U.S. territory, ended negotiations with Britain and instead negotiated terms to become part of the United States.

Many of its citizens favored political union with the United States rather than full independence. While the Continental Congress did not allow a seat for Vermont, Vermont engaged William Samuel Johnson, representing Connecticut, to promote its interests. In 1785 the Vermont General Assembly granted Johnson title to the former King's College Tract as a form of compensation for representing Vermont.

== Name ==
The constitution and other official documents referred to the country as the "State of Vermont.” The 1777 constitution refers to Vermont variously: the third paragraph of the preamble, for example, mentions "the State of Vermont,” and in the preamble's last paragraph, the constitution refers to itself as "the Constitution of the Commonwealth." The currency used by the country, the Vermont copper, carried the legend that read Vermontis. Res. Publica, which in Latin means: Republic of Vermont.

Prior to June 2, 1777, it was also known as the Republic of New Connecticut, and the Republic of the Green Mountains.

== Background ==
Reconstruction of the flag of the Green Mountain Boys, a militia instrumental in the Republic's creation. Today the flag is used by the Vermont National Guard.

Historical population
Year	Pop.	±%
1770	10,000	—
1780	47,620	+376.2%
1790	85,425	+79.4%
Source: 1770–1780; 1790

After 1724, the Province of Massachusetts Bay built Fort Dummer near Brattleboro, as well as three other forts along the northern portion of the Connecticut River to protect against raids by Native Americans farther south into Western Massachusetts. After 1749, Benning Wentworth, the Royal Governor of New Hampshire, granted land to anyone in a land-granting scheme designed to enrich himself and his family. After 1763, settlement increased because of easing security concerns after the end of the French and Indian Wars. The Province of New York had made grants of land, often in areas overlapping similar grants made by the Province of New Hampshire; this issue had to be resolved by King George III in 1764, who granted the land to New York, but the area was popularly known as the New Hampshire Grants. The "Green Mountain Boys," led by Ethan Allen, was a militia force from Vermont that supported the New Hampshire claims and fought in Revolutionary War.

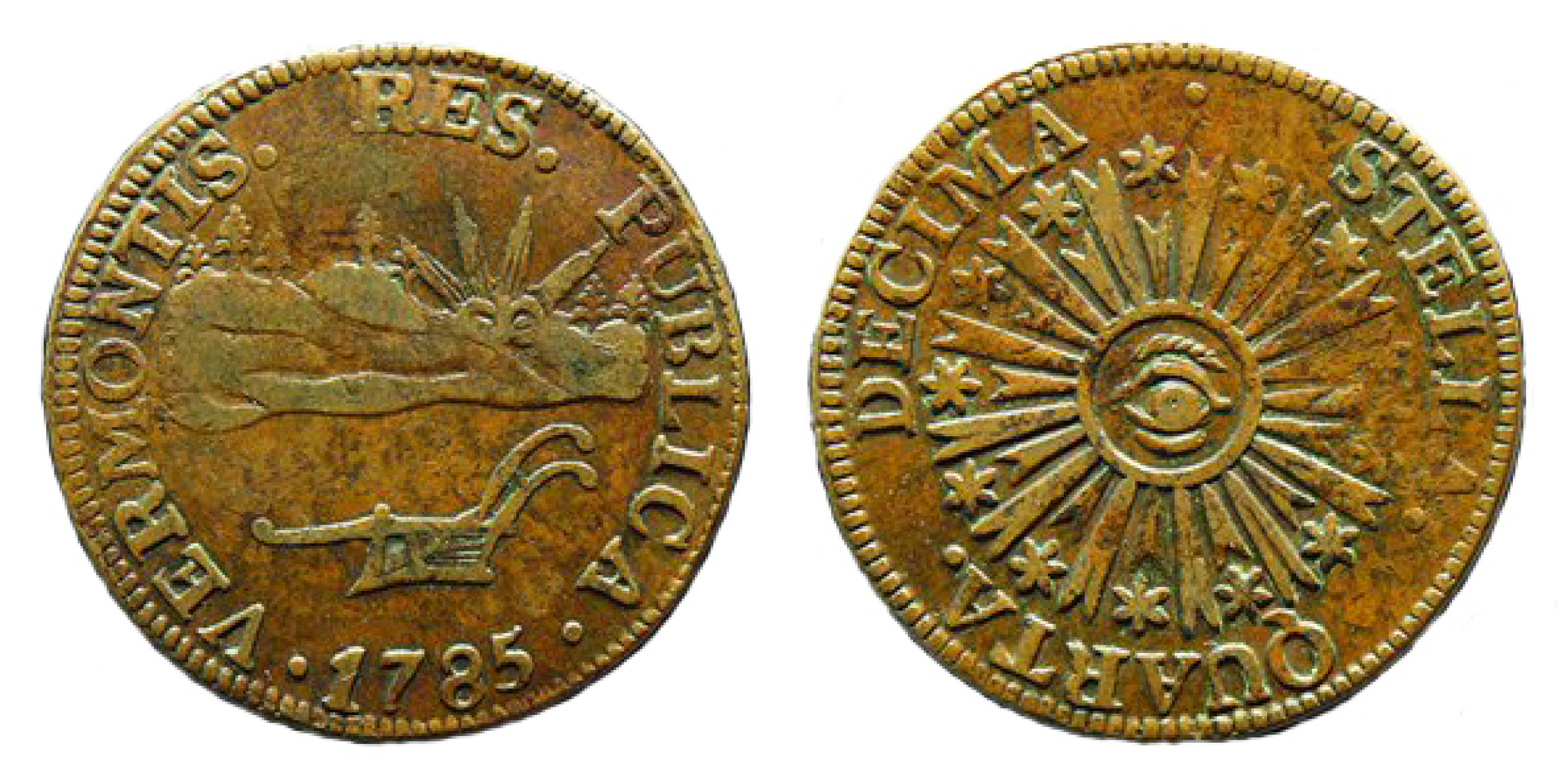
Vermont coin with the passage VERMONTIS. RES. PUBLICA. on the obverse, and the motto "STELLA QUARTA DECIMA" on the reverse

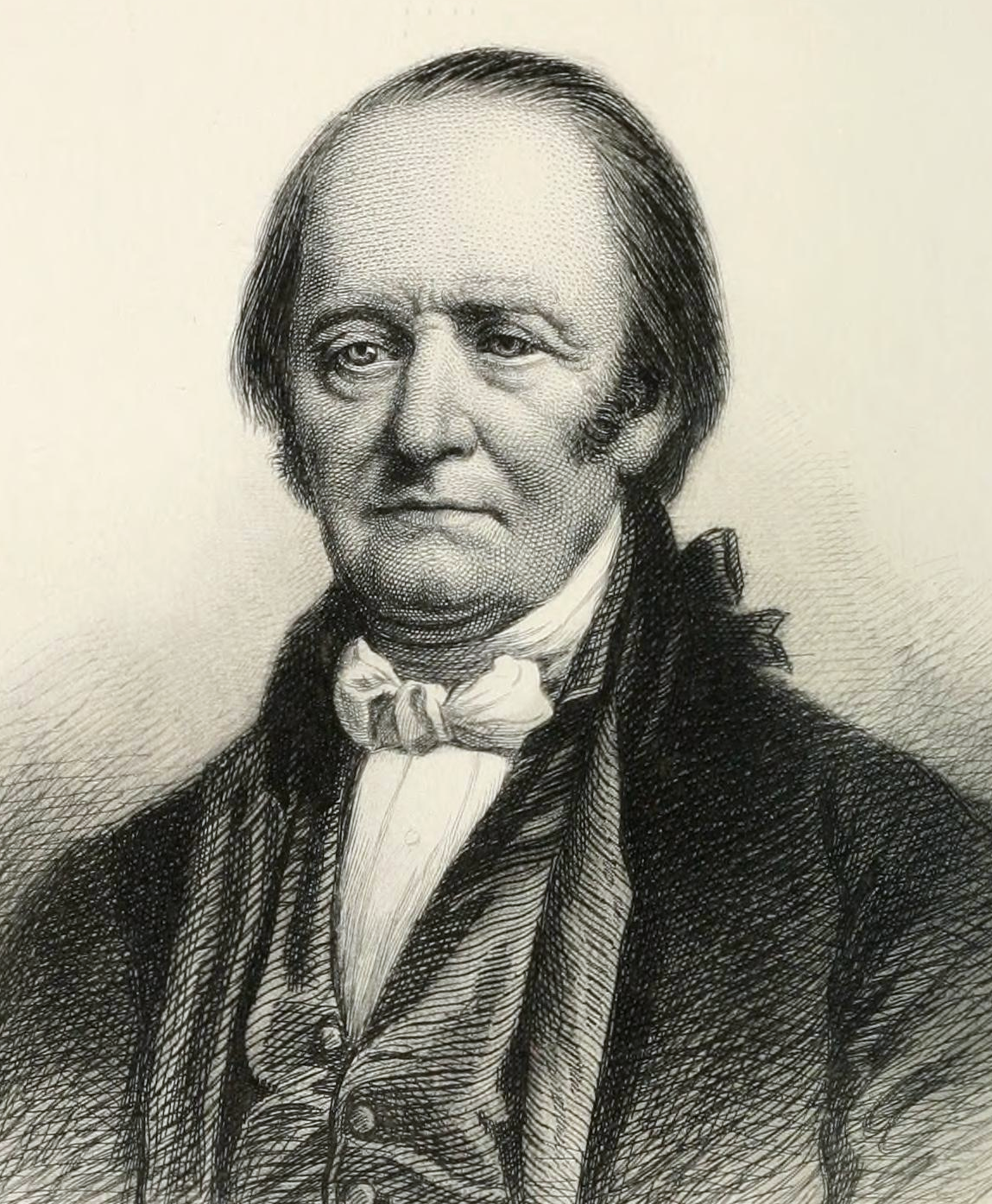
Engraving of Thomas Chittenden, first and third governor of the Vermont Republic, and first governor of the State of Vermont with the most gubernatorial terms held to date

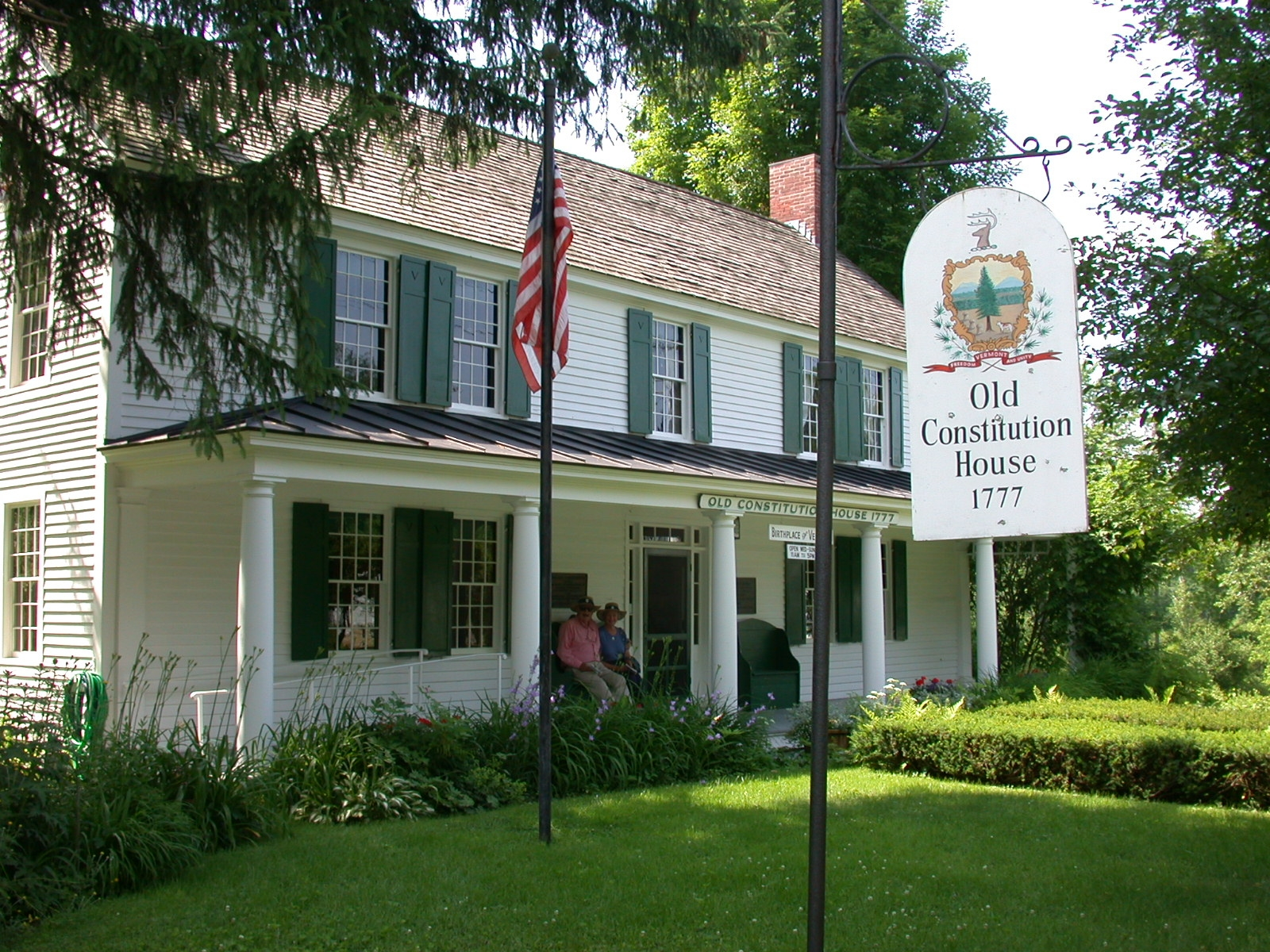
The Old Constitution House in Windsor, Vermont, where the 1777 constitution was signed, is also called the birthplace of Vermont.

== Founding ==
Following controversy between the holders of the New York grants and the New Hampshire grants, Ethan Allen and his militia of "Green Mountain Boys" suppressed Loyalists through their enforcement of the Sequestration Act, (which permitted the seizure and resale of properties owned by known loyalists). On January 15, 1777, a convention of representatives from towns in the territory declared the region independent, choosing the name the Republic of New Connecticut (although it was sometimes known colloquially as the Republic of the Green Mountains). On June 2 of that year, the name was officially changed to "Vermont" (from the French, les verts monts, meaning the Green Mountains) upon the suggestion of Thomas Young, a member of the Sons of Liberty, a Boston Tea Party leader, and mentor to Ethan Allen.

John Greenleaf Whittier's poem The Song of the Vermonters, 1779 describes the period in ballad form. First published anonymously, the poem had characteristics in the last stanza that were similar to Ethan Allen's prose and caused it to be attributed to Allen for nearly 60 years. The last stanza reads:

Come York or come Hampshire, come traitors or knaves,
If ye rule o'er our land ye shall rule o'er our graves;
Our vow is recorded—our banner unfurled,
In the name of Vermont we defy all the world!

On August 20, 1781, the Confederation Congress of the United States passed resolutions saying it would not consider admitting that state to the Union unless Vermont would renounce its claims to territory east of the Connecticut River and west of Lake Champlain.

== Constitution and frame of government ==
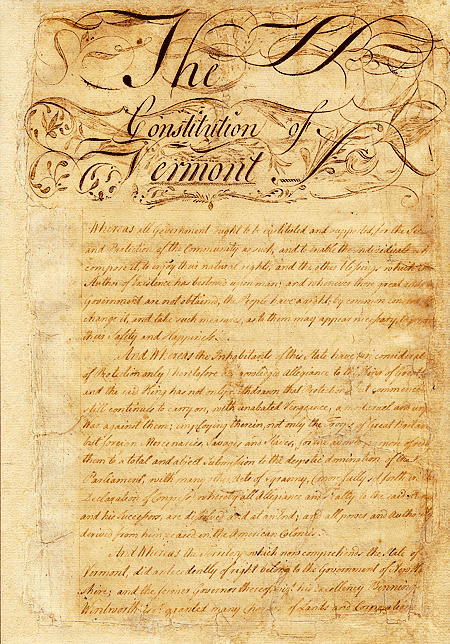
Vellum manuscript of the 1777 Constitution of Vermont

The Constitution of Vermont was drafted and ratified at Elijah West's Windsor Tavern in 1777. The settlers in Vermont, who sought independence from New York, justified their constitution on the same basis as the first state constitutions of the former colonies: authority is derived from the people. As historian Christian Fritz notes in American Sovereigns: The People and America's Constitutional Tradition before the Civil War:

They saw themselves as a distinct region outside the legitimate jurisdiction of New York. Possessing an identifiable population or "a people" entitled them to the same constitutional rights of self-government as other "Peoples" in the American confederacy.

The Vermont constitution was modeled after the radically democratic constitution of Pennsylvania on the suggestion of Young, who worked with Thomas Paine and others on that 1776 document in Philadelphia.

During its time as an independent state, the government issued its own coinage and currency and operated postal service. The currency was known as the Vermont copper, and its mint was operated by Reuben Harmon in East Rupert from 1785 to 1788. The chief executive of the state was referred to as the governor.

The governor of Vermont, Thomas Chittenden, with consent of his council and the General Assembly, appointed commissioners to the American government seated in Philadelphia. Vermont engaged in diplomatic negotiations with the United States, the Netherlands, and France.

After a combined British-Mohawk force raided several Vermont settlements in the 1780 Royalton raid, Ethan Allen led a group of Vermont politicians in secret discussions with Frederick Haldimand, the Governor General of the Province of Quebec, about returning Vermont to British rule.

=== Symbolism of fourteen ===
Much of the symbolism associated with Vermont in this period expressed a desire for political union with the United States. Vermont's coins minted in 1785 and 1786 bore the Latin inscription "STELLA QUARTA DECIMA" (meaning "the fourteenth star"). The Great Seal of Vermont, designed by Ira Allen, centrally features a 14-branched pine tree.

== Union ==
On March 6, 1790, the legislature of New York consented to Vermont statehood, provided that a group of commissioners representing New York and a similar group representing Vermont could agree on the boundary. Vermont's negotiators insisted on also settling the real-estate disputes rather than leaving those to be decided later by a federal court. On October 7, the commissioners proclaimed the negotiations successfully concluded, with an agreement that Vermont would pay $30,000 to New York to be distributed among New Yorkers who claimed land in Vermont under New York land patents. The Vermont General Assembly then authorized a convention to consider an application for admittance to the "Union of the United States of America.” The convention met at Bennington, on January 6, 1791. On January 10, 1791, the convention approved a resolution to make an application to join the United States by a vote of 105 to 2. Vermont was admitted to the Union by 1 Stat. 191 on March 4, 1791. Vermont's admission act is the shortest of all state admissions, and Vermont is "the only state admitted without conditions of any kind, either those prescribed by the Congress or the state from which it was carved.” March 4 is celebrated in Vermont as Vermont Day.

The North, the smaller states, and states concerned about the impact of the sea-to-sea grants held by other states, all supported Vermont's admission. Thomas Chittenden served as governor for Vermont for most of this period and became its first governor as a member state of the United States.

The 1793 Vermont state constitution made relatively few changes to the 1786 Vermont state constitution, which had, in turn, succeeded the 1777 constitution. It retained many of its original ideas, as noted above, and kept the separation of powers. It remains in force with several amendments.

== See also ==
- 1789 Vermont Republic gubernatorial election
- Impeachment in Vermont – Political process in Vermont
- Second Vermont Republic – Secessionist group in US state
- State of Deseret – Provisional U.S. state founded by Mormons (1848–1850)
- Republic of East Florida – Unrecognized proto-state
- Kingdom of Hawaii – Country in the Pacific Ocean (1795–1893)
- Republic of Hawaii – Transitional republic in Hawaii before US annexation, 1894–1898
- Indian Territory – Historic sovereign territory set aside for Native American nations, 1834–1907
- Provisional Government of Oregon – Early elected government of Pacific Northwest, 1843–1849
- Republic of the Rio Grande – Federalist revolt on the lower Rio Grande, 1838–1840
- Republic of Sonora – Former Federal Republic in Northern Mexico, 1854
- Republic of Texas – Country in North America (1836–1846)
- Republic of West Florida – 1810 unrecognized republic in Spanish West Florida
