= 2024 in Vermont =

- Decades: 2000s; 2010s; 2020s
- See also: History of Vermont; Historical outline of Vermont; List of years in Vermont; 2024 in the United States

The following is a list of events of the year 2024 in Vermont.

== Incumbents ==
=== State government ===
- Governor: Phil Scott (R)

== Events ==
- March 5 –
  - Super Tuesday:
    - The Democratic Party holds presidential nominating contests in Vermont, amongst other states.
    - The Republican Party holds presidential nominating contests in Utah, amongst other states.
- April 28 – Cornel West 2024 presidential campaign:Cornel West wins the nomination of the Green Mountain Peace and Justice Party, gaining ballot access in Vermont.**
- November 5 –
  - 2024 United States presidential election in Vermont
  - 2024 VermontHouse of Representatives election

== See also ==
- 2024 in the United States
