= VTL =

VTL may refer to:

- Virtual tape library, for computer data storage
- Vermont Transit Lines, US
- Vertical turret lathe
- Apache Velocity Template Language
- Valtion teknillinen tutkimuslaitos, a research institute in Finland, now known as VTT Technical Research Centre of Finland
