= 2023 in Vermont =

- Decades: 2000s; 2010s; 2020s
- See also: History of Vermont; Historical outline of Vermont; List of years in Vermont; 2023 in the United States

The following is a list of events of the year 2023 in Vermont.

== Incumbents ==
=== State government ===
- Governor: Phil Scott (R)

== Events ==
- June 29 – Smoke from the Canadian wildfires affects several U.S. states, including Vermont.
- July 11 – Montpelier receives extensive flooding after the Wrightsville Dam exceeds capacity.
- November 26 – 2023 shooting of Palestinian students in Burlington, Vermont: Three students of Palestinian ethnicity are shot and injured by an unknown attacker in Burlington, in what police are describe as a possible hate crime.

== See also ==
- 2023 in the United States
