= 2026 in Vermont =

- Decades: 2000s; 2010s; 2020s
- See also: History of Vermont; Historical outline of Vermont; List of years in Vermont; 2026 in the United States

The following is a list of events of the year 2026 in Vermont.

== Incumbents ==
=== State government ===
- Governor: Phil Scott (R)

== Events ==
- March 11 – State and local police arrest six protesters in South Burlington. The protesters had gathered against an ICE raid at a home where three people were detained.
- May 26 – Governor Scott signs a bill that bans paraquat in the state over its link to Parkinson's disease.
- June 17 – Dairy Farmers of America announces it is closing its milk processing plant in St. Albans.
- August 1 – Vermont Green FC wins the 2026 USL League Two championship, beating the Flint City Bucks 2–1.
- September 21 – A jury convicts Jason Eaton of attempted murder for the 2023 shooting of three Palestinian college students near his home in Burlington.
- November 3:
  - 2026 Vermont House of Representatives election
  - 2026 Vermont Senate election
  - 2026 Vermont gubernatorial election: Phil Scott wins reelection.
  - 2026 Vermont lieutenant gubernatorial election
  - 2026 Vermont Proposal 3
  - 2026 United States House of Representatives election in Vermont: Becca Balint wins reelection.

== See also ==
- 2026 in the United States
