= 2025 in Vermont =

- Decades: 2000s; 2010s; 2020s
- See also: History of Vermont; Historical outline of Vermont; List of years in Vermont; 2025 in the United States

The following is a list of events of the year 2025 in Vermont.

== Incumbents ==
=== State government ===
- Governor: Phil Scott (R)

== Events ==
- January 20 – Border Patrol Agent David Maland is shot and killed during a traffic stop in Coventry. Ophelia Bauckholt, who shot Maland, is shot and killed by agents. Maland's murder is connected to other homicides committed by a rationalist group called the Zizians.
- March 5 – Elder financial abuse: The U.S. Attorney's Office for the District Court of Vermont indicts and charges 25 Canadians for conspiracy to defraud elderly people in the United States out of US$21 million and charges five of those 25 with conspiracy to commit money laundering.
- March 20 – The United States closes Canadian access to the Haskell Free Library and Opera House, a library that straddles the border of Derby Line, Vermont, and Stanstead, Quebec. The library later opens a new entrance on the Canadian side.
- April 14 – Immigration and Customs Enforcement (ICE) agents arrest Columbia University student Mohsen Mahdawi at the U.S. Citizenship and Immigration Services office in Colchester. Mahdawi had been involved with pro-Palestinian protests at Columbia in 2023 and 2024.
- April 30 – Federal judge Geoffrey W. Crawford orders that Mohsen Mahdawi be released.
- September 18 – Vermont joins the Northeast Public Health Collaborative, a collaborative health agency among Northeastern states.
- October 18 – Transgender Middlebury College student Lia Smith dies by suicide.
- October 20 – State Senator Sam Douglass announces he will resign following a report by Politico that he and other members of Young Republicans groups, including his wife Brianna, were in a group chat that contained racist and antisemitic messages.
- November 12 – Sterling College in Craftsbury announces it will close after the Spring 2026 semester.

== Sports ==
- 2024–25 Vermont Catamounts men's ice hockey season
- 2024–25 Vermont Catamounts men's basketball team
- 2024–25 Vermont Catamounts women's ice hockey season
- 2024–25 Vermont Catamounts women's basketball team

== See also ==
- 2025 in the United States
