= National Register of Historic Places listings in Vermont =

The following properties in Vermont are listed on the National Register of Historic Places.

Contents: Counties in Vermont / See also: Vermont state-wide list
- Addison
- Bennington
- Caledonia
- Chittenden
- Essex
- Franklin
- Grand Isle
- Lamoille
- Orange
- Orleans
- Rutland
- Washington
- Windham
- Windsor

This National Park Service list is complete through NPS recent listings posted August 28, 2026.

== Current listings by county ==

The following are approximate tallies of current listings by county. These counts are based on entries in the National Register Information Database as of April 24, 2008 and new weekly listings posted since then on the National Register of Historic Places web site. There are frequent additions to the listings and occasional delistings and the counts here are approximate and not official. New entries are added to the official Register on a weekly basis. Also, the counts in this table exclude boundary increase and decrease listings which modify the area covered by an existing property or district and which carry a separate National Register reference number. The numbers of NRHP listings in each county are documented by tables in each of the individual county list-articles.

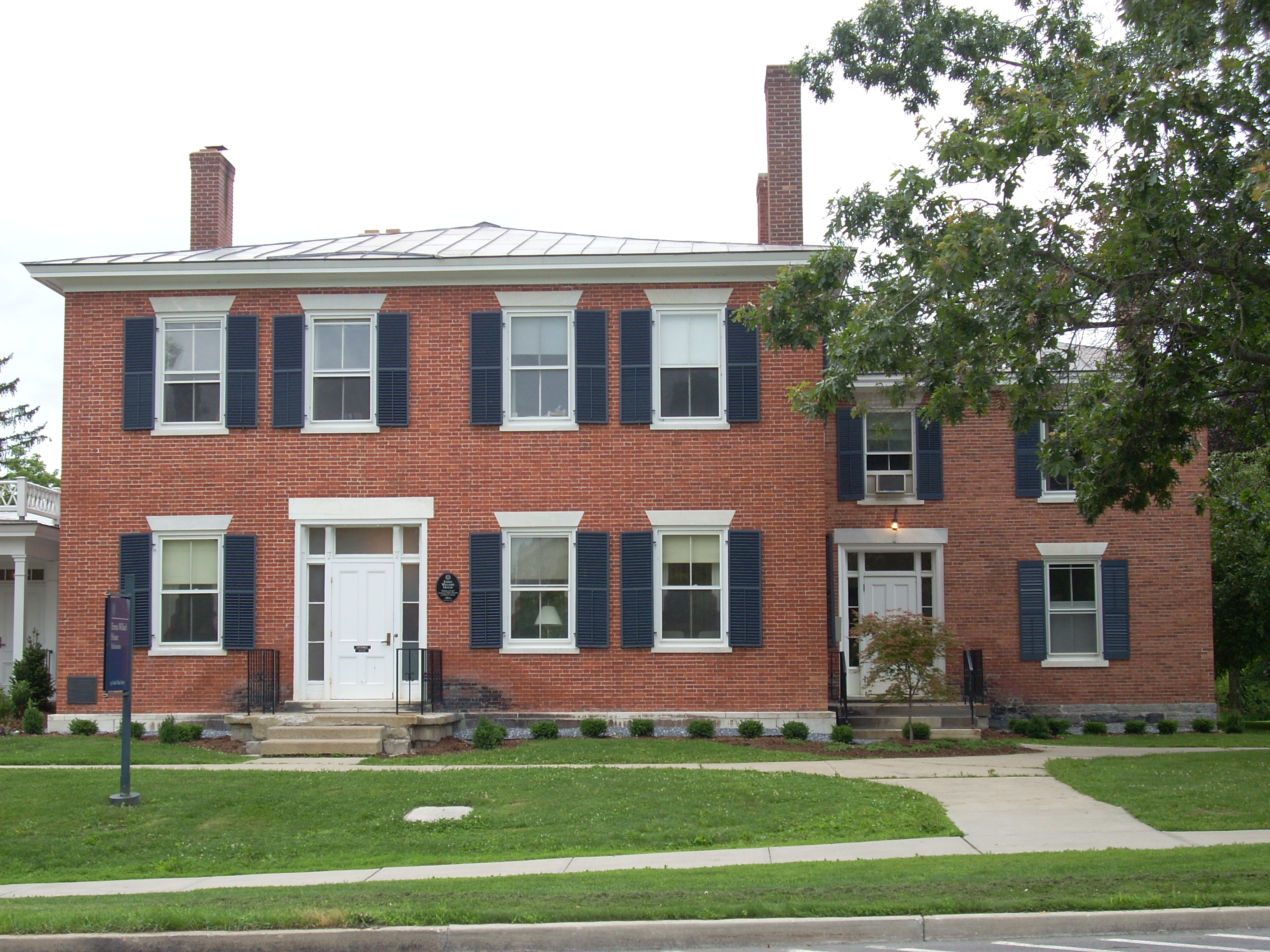
Emma Willard House, in Addison County

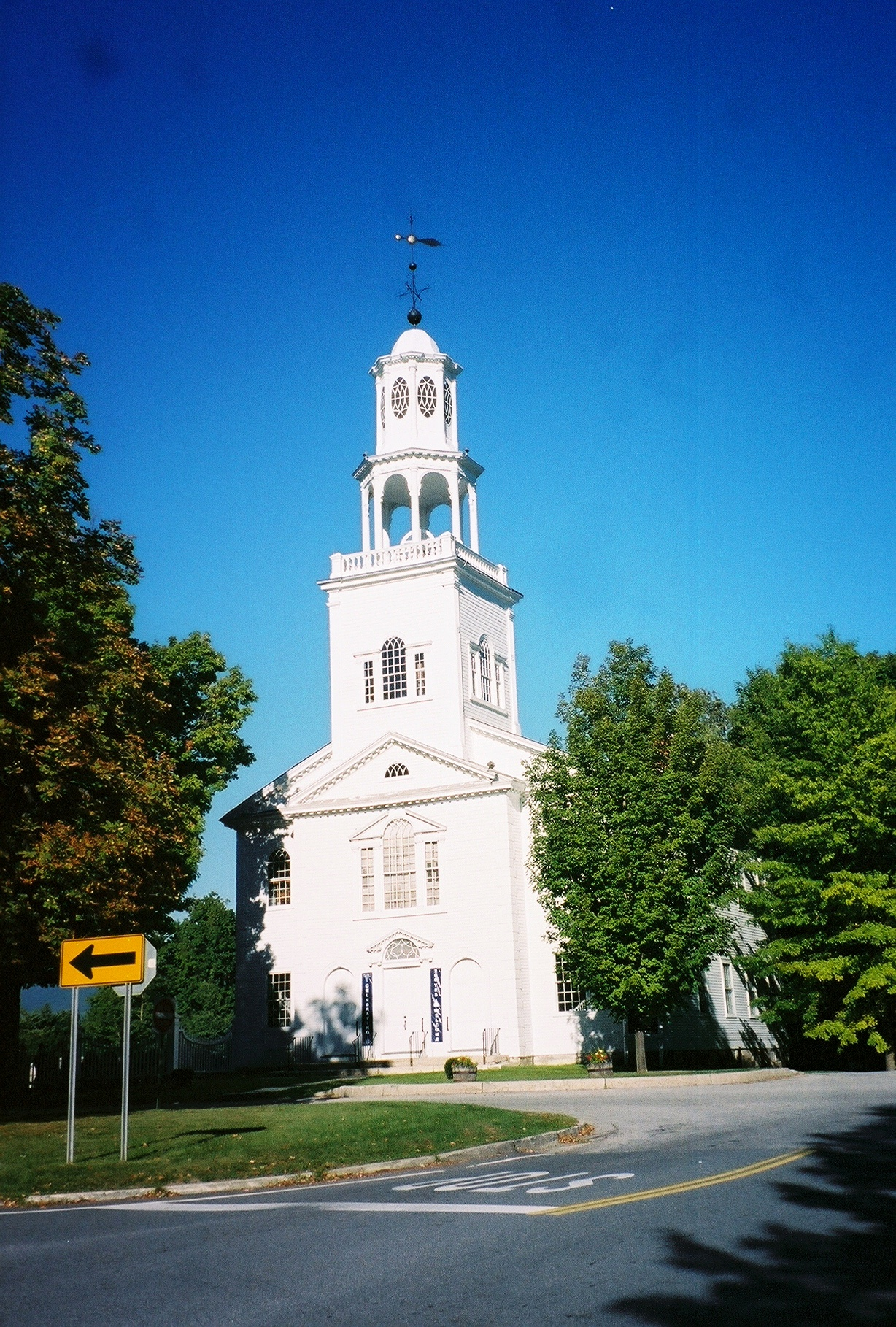
First Congregational Church of Bennington, in Bennington County

| | County | # of Sites |
|---|---|---|
| 1 | Addison | 73 |
| 2 | Bennington | 54 |
| 3 | Caledonia | 58 |
| 4 | Chittenden | 113 |
| 5 | Essex | 11 |
| 6 | Franklin | 65 |
| 7 | Grand Isle | 12 |
| 8 | Lamoille | 32 |
| 9 | Orange | 64 |
| 10 | Orleans | 29 |
| 11 | Rutland | 77 |
| 12 | Washington | 75 |
| 13 | Windham | 100 |
| 14 | Windsor | 135 |
| (duplicates) | | (2) |
| Total: | | 896 |

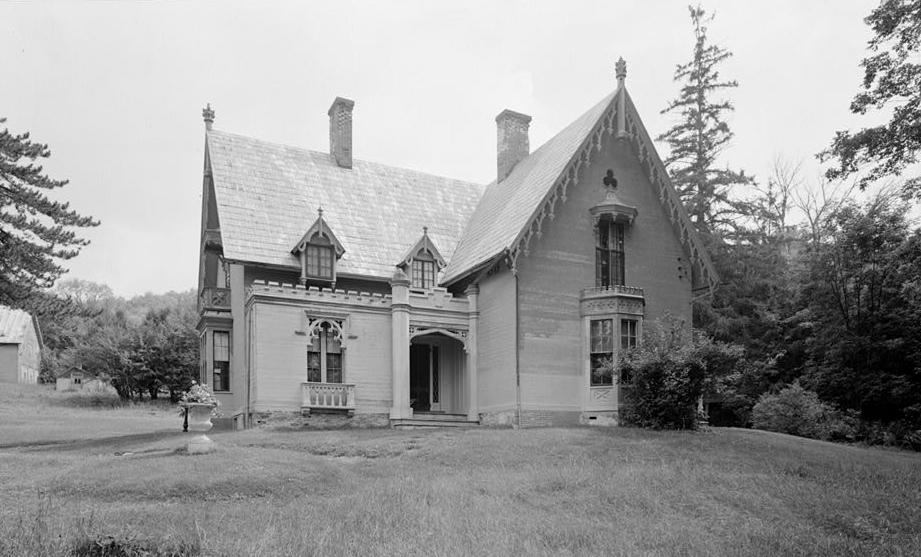
Justin Smith Morrill Homestead, in Orange County

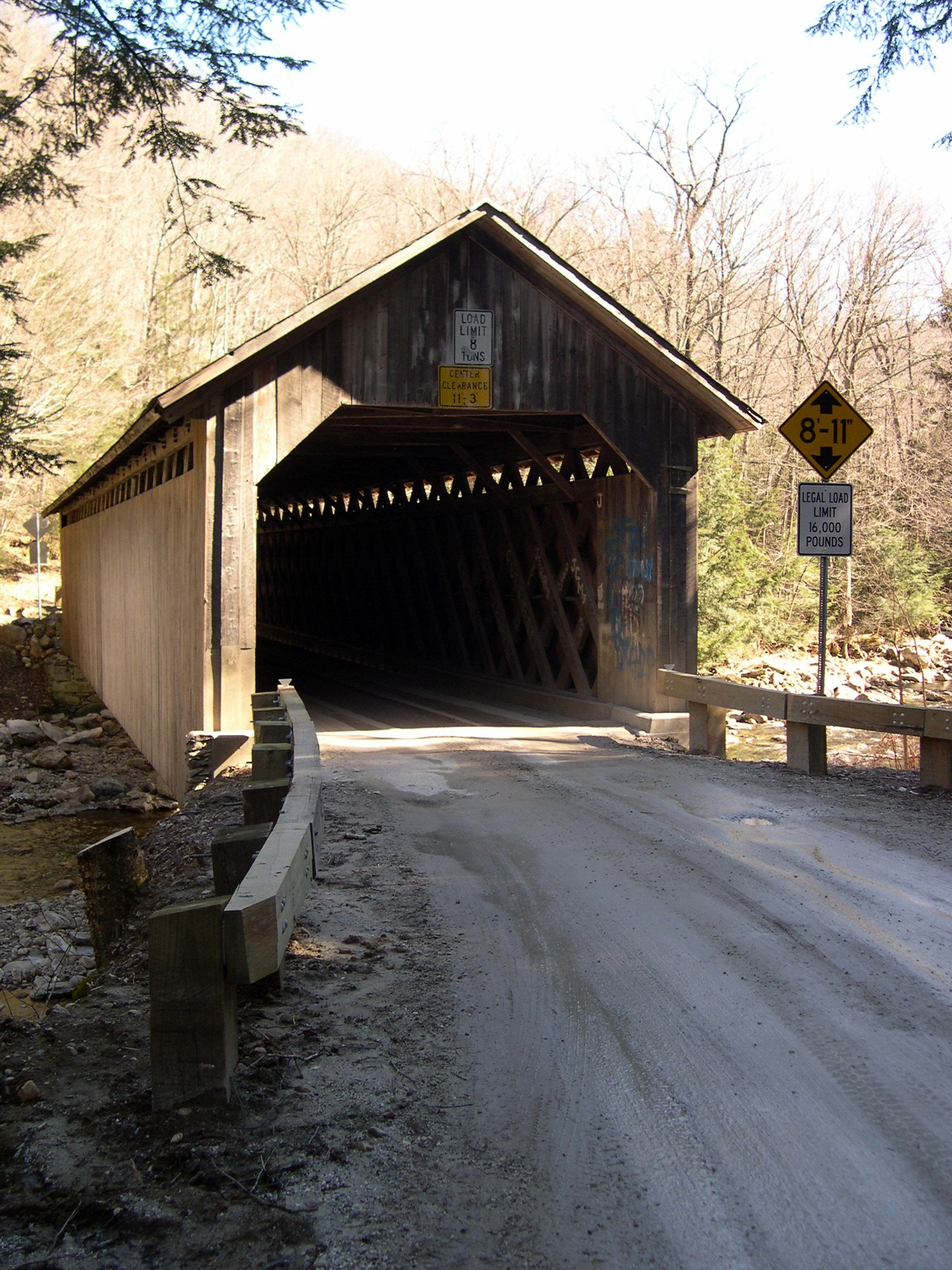
Brown Covered Bridge, in Rutland County

== See also ==
- List of National Historic Landmarks in Vermont
- List of bridges on the National Register of Historic Places in Vermont
- List of historical societies in Vermont
