= Londonderry Arts and Historical Society =

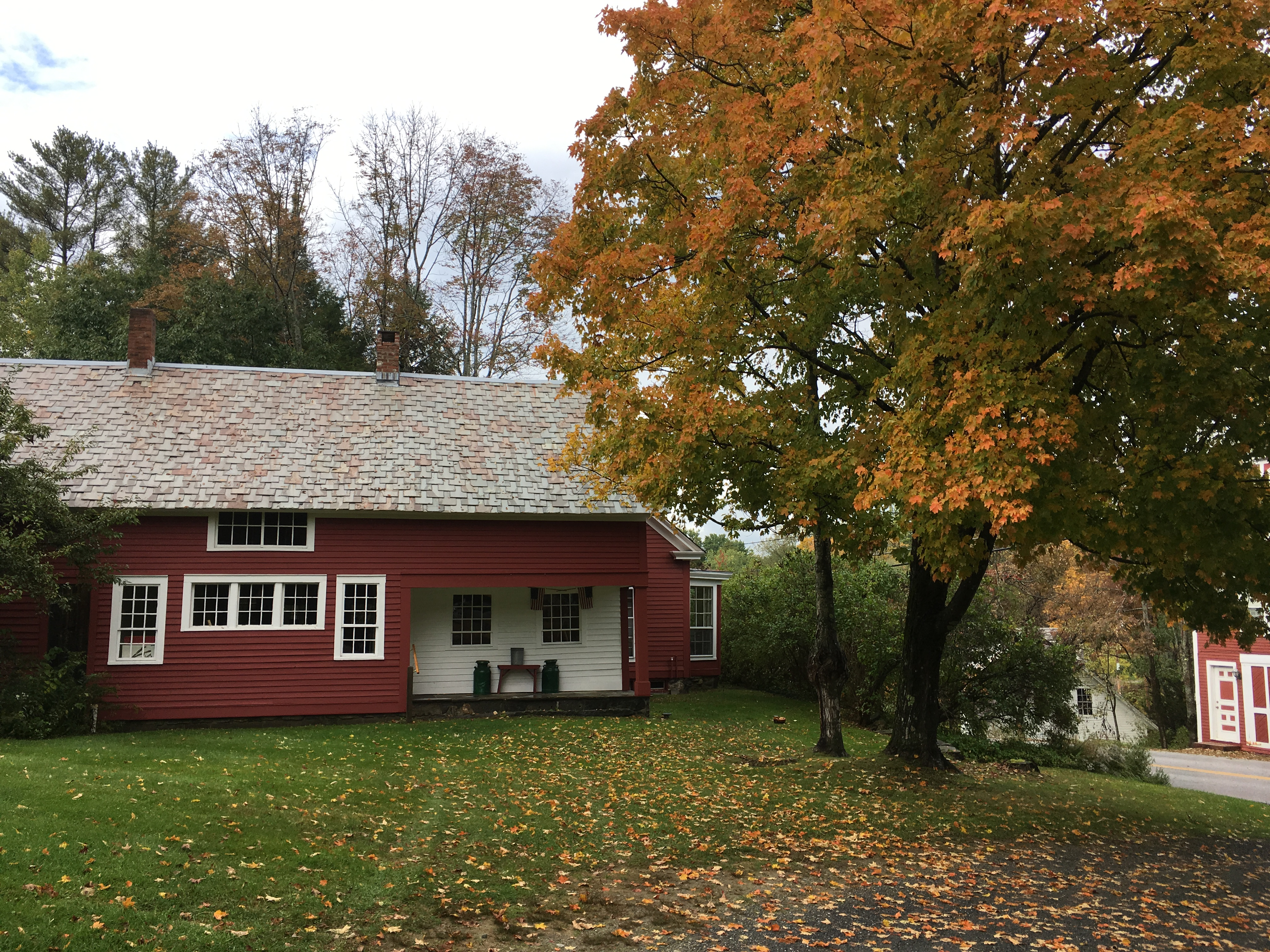
View of the Custer-Sharp House, once belonging to Bernadine Custer and Arthur Sharp, now home to the Londonderry Arts and Historical Society, Londonderry, Vermont

The Londonderry Arts and Historical Society is a non-profit organization dedicated to preserving and sharing the local history of Londonderry, VT and the adjacent territory. The organization maintains two historic structures: The Custer-Sharp House and the Middle Town School House.

The organization, originally titled the Londonderry Historical Society, was founded in 1971 by local residents who wished to study the history of the town and surrounding area. The Society was originally located inside the town office, opening a small "Londonderry Historical Museum" in 1983.

Upon the death of local artist Bernadine Custer Sharp in 1991, the society was bequeathed the artist's mid-1800s farmhouse; Bernadine asked for her house to be used as a local center for the arts. In 1992, the Society began an extensive renovation on the farmhouse, eventually moving its collection to the Custer-Sharp House. In 2013, the organization changed its name from the Londonderry Historical Society to the Londonderry Arts and Historical Society to better reflect their revised mission upon Bernadine's donation.

The Society's collection contains nearly 3,000 works on paper by the artist Bernadine Custer Sharp as well as other local artists such as her husband Arthur "Jimmy" Sharp and Harry Shokler. The organization also collects objects and documents pertaining to history of the town.

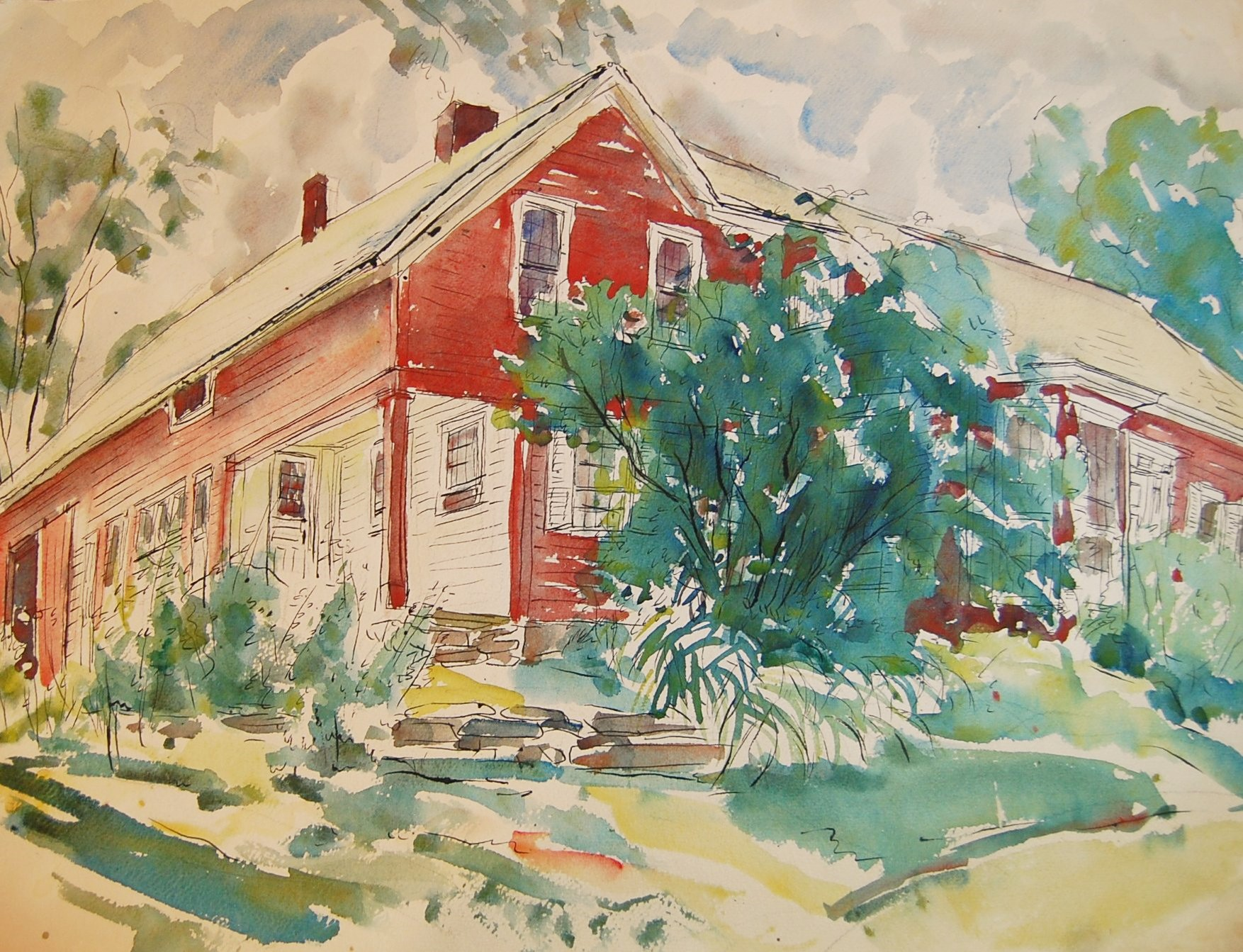
Watercolor by Bernadine Custer of the Custer-Sharp House, c. 1960s

The Custer-Sharp House is open on Saturdays during the summer months and features exhibits on local history and/or art.

== See also ==
- List of historical societies in Vermont
