= List of historical societies in Vermont =

The following is a list of historical societies in the state of Vermont, United States.

== Organizations ==
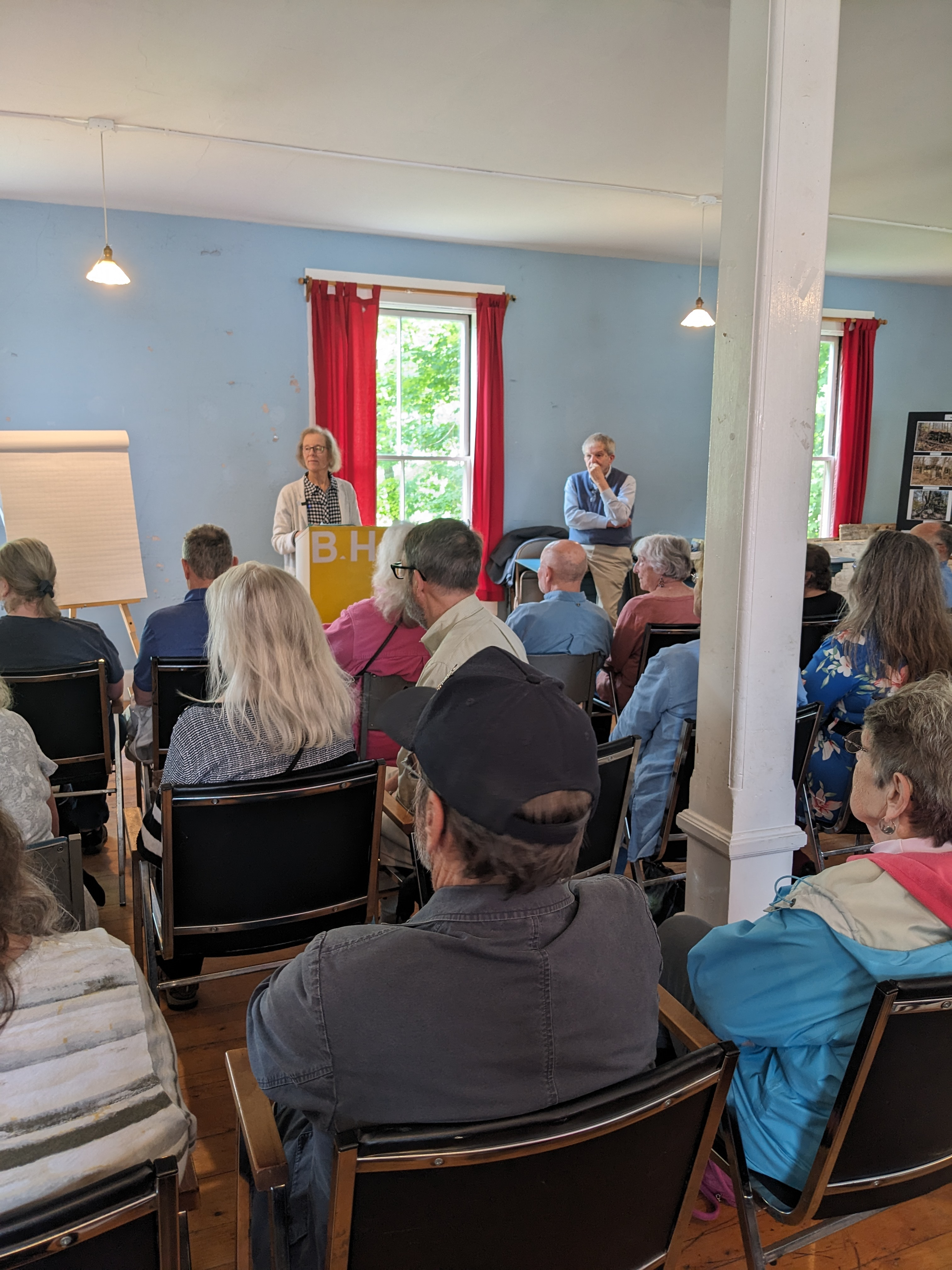
Lecture attendees, Bridgewater Historical Society, Vermont, 2024

1881 publication of the Rutland County Historical Society, Vermont

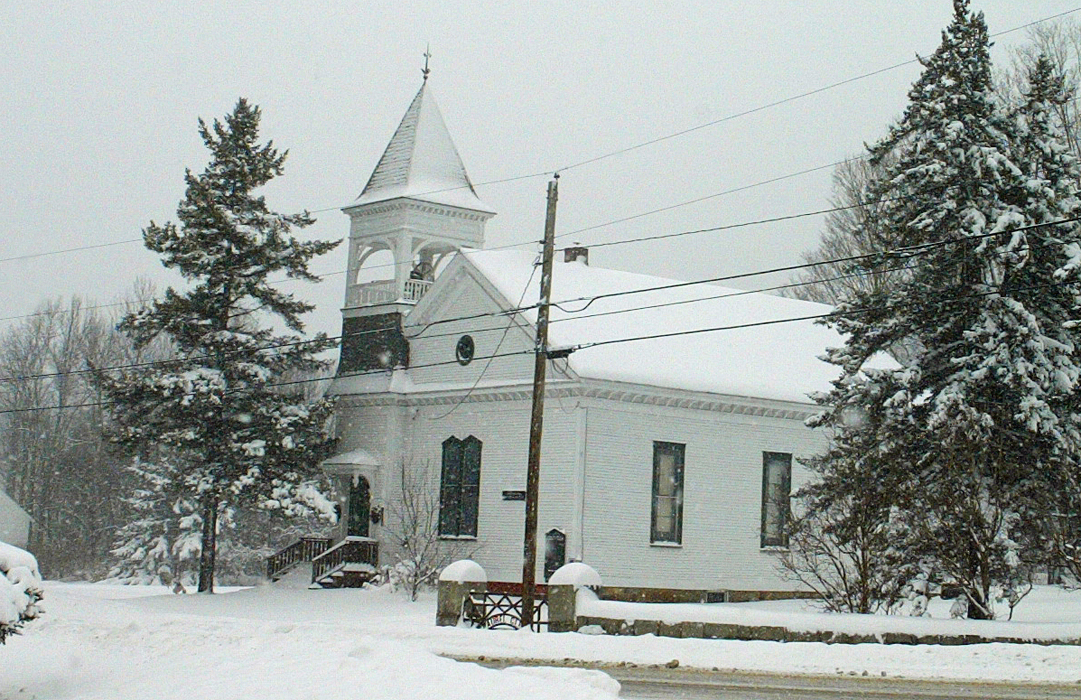
Shrewsbury Historical Society building in Vermont (photo 2012)

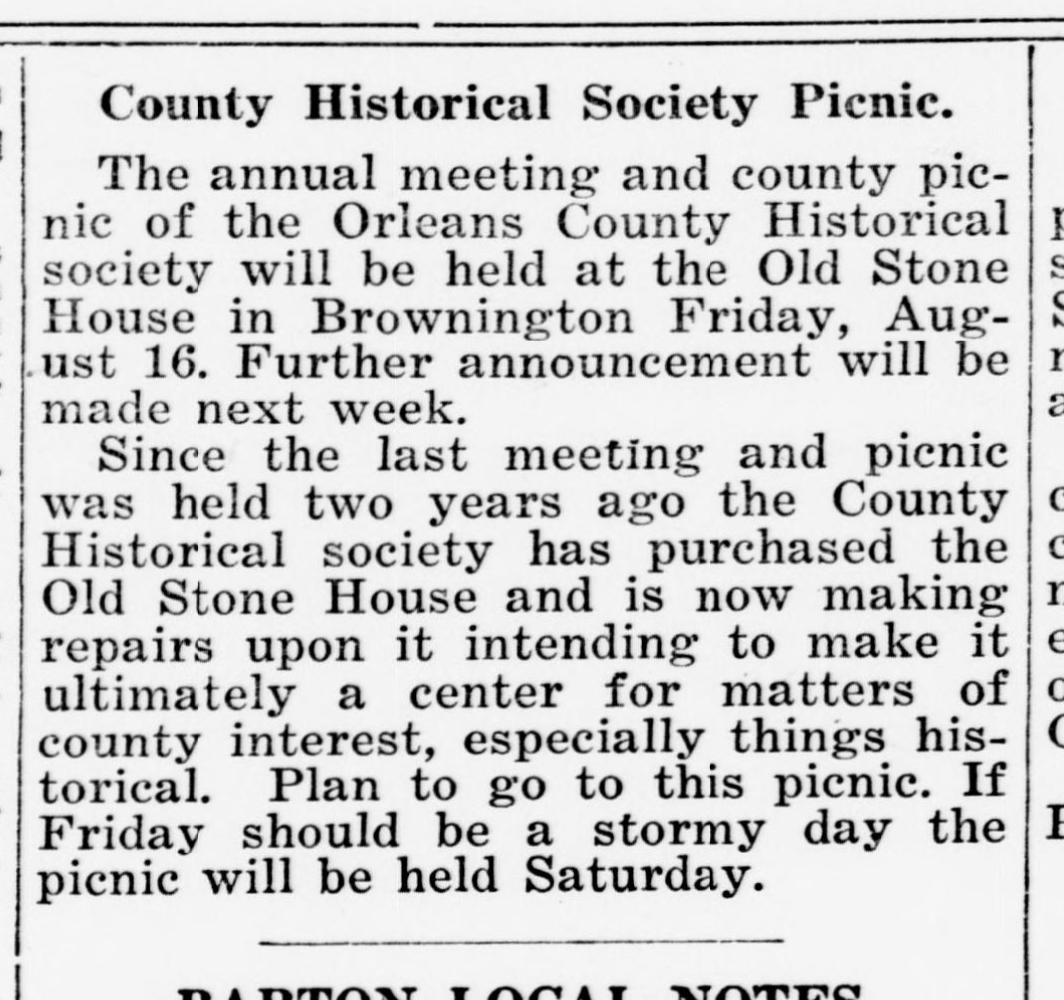
1918 newspaper item about an Orleans County Historical Society picnic in Brownington, Vermont

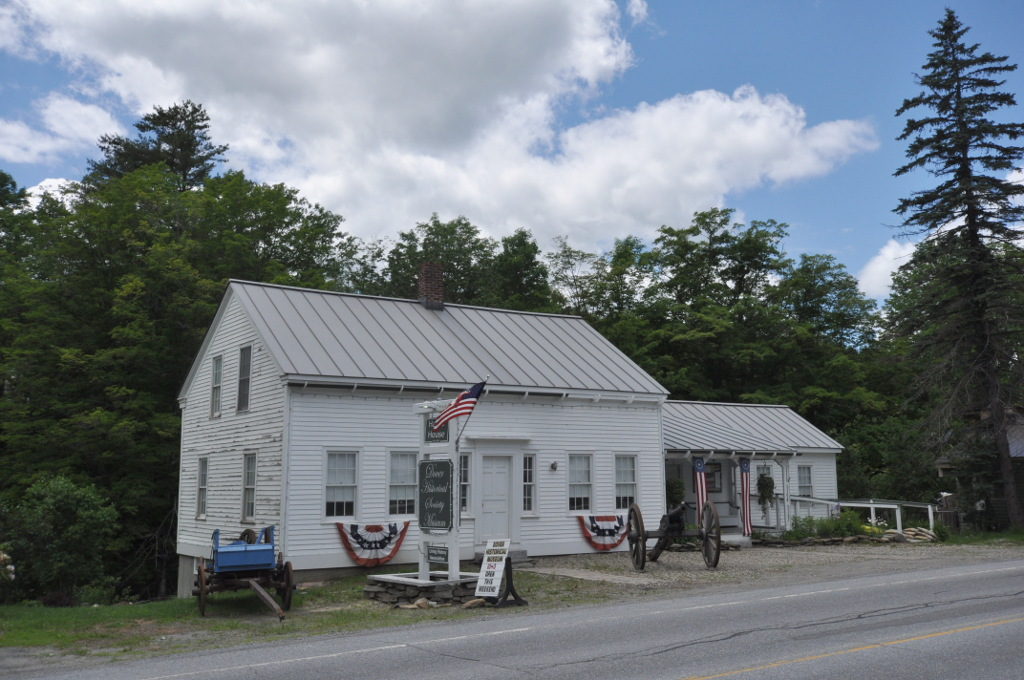
Dover Historical Society building in Vermont (photo 2017)

- Addison Town Historical Society
- Alburgh Historical Society
- Barnard Historical Society
- Barnet Historical Society
- Barre Historical Society
- Bellows Falls Historical Society
- Bennington Historical Society
- Berlin Historical Society
- Bethel Historical Society
- Black River Historical Society
- Braintree Historical Society
- Brattleboro Historical Society
- Bridgewater Historical Society
- Bridport Historical Society
- Historical Society of Brookfield Vermont
- Cabot Historical Society
- Cambridge Historical Society
- Canaan Historical Society, Vermont
- Castleton Historical Society
- Cavendish Historical Society
- Central Vermont Railway Historical Society
- Champlain Valley Historical Reenactors
- Charlotte Historical Society
- Chelsea Historical Society
- Chester Historical Society
- Chittenden County Historical Society
- Chittenden Historical Society
- Historical Society of Clarendon Vermont
- Colchester Historical Society
- Concord Historical Society
- Corinth Historical Society
- Cornwall Historical Society
- Craftsbury Historical Society
- Crystal Lake Falls Historical Association
- Danville Historical Society
- Dorset Historical Society
- Dover Historical Society
- Dummerston Historical Society
- Duxbury Historical Society
- East Middlebury Historical Society
- East Montpelier Historical Society
- Eden Historical Society
- Elmore Historical Society
- Enosburgh Historical Society
- Essex Community Historical Society
- Essex Junction Historical Society
- Fair Haven Historical Society
- Fairfax Historical Society
- Fayston Historical Society
- Ferrisburgh Historical Society
- Fletcher Historical Society
- Glover Historical Society
- Grafton Historical Society
- Grand Isle Historical Society
- Green Mountain Perkins Academy and Historical Association
- Greensboro Historical Society
- Groton Historical Society, Vermont
- Guilford Historical
- Halifax Historical Society
- Hancock Historical Society
- Hardwick Historical Society
- Hartford Historical Society
- Hartland Historical Society
- Highgate Historical Society
- Hinesburg Historical Society
- Holland Historical Society
- Huntington Historical and Community Trust
- Ira Historical Society
- Island Pond Historical Society
- Jamaica Historical Foundation
- Jericho Historical Society
- Johnson Historical Society
- Landgrove Historical Society
- Lincoln Historical Society
- Living History Association
- Londonderry Arts and Historical Society
- Lunenburg Historical Society
- Manchester Historical Society
- Historical Society of Marlboro
- Mendon Historical Society
- Middlebury Historical Society
- Middlesex Historical Society
- Middletown Springs Historical Society
- Milton Historical Society
- Missisquoi Valley Historical Society
- Monkton Museum & Historical Society
- Montgomery Historical Society
- Moretown Historical Society
- Morgan Historical Society
- Morristown Historical Society
- Mount Holly Historical Society
- Mt Tabor-Danby Historical Society
- Newbury Historical Society
- North Hero Historical Society
- Northfield Historical Society
- Norwich Historical Society
- Orleans County Historical Society
- Pawlett Historical Society
- Peacham Historical Association
- Pittsfield Historical Society
- Pittsford VT Historical Society
- Plainfield Historical Society
- Plymouth Vermont Historical Society
- Pomfret Historical Society
- Poultney Historical Society
- Pownal Historical Society
- Putney Historical Society
- Randolph Historical Society
- Reading Historical Society
- Richford Historical Society
- Richmond Historical Society
- Ripton Historical Society
- Rochester Historical Society
- Rupert Historical Society
- Rutland County Historical Society
- Rutland Historical Society
- Ryegate Historical Society
- Saint Albans Museum & Historical Society
- Saxtons River Historical Society
- Sharon Historical Society
- Sheffield Historical Society
- Shelburne Historical Society
- Sheldon Art Museum Archaeological and Historical Society
- Sheldon Historical Society
- Shoreham Historical Society
- Shrewsbury Historical Society
- South Hero Historical Society
- Southern Vermont Natural History Museum
- Springfield Art & Historical Society
- St Johnsbury History & Heritage Center
- Starksboro Historical Society
- Stockbridge-Gaysville Historical Society
- Stowe Historical Society
- Strafford Historical Society
- Swanton Historical Society
- Thetford Historical Society
- Tinmouth Historical & Genealogical Society
- Topsham Historical Society
- Townshend Historical Society
- Historical Society Underhill
- Vermont African-American History Project
- Vermont Historical Society
- Vermont History and Public Health
- Vermont Labor History Society
- Vershire Historical Society
- Waitsfield Historical Society
- Walden Historical Committee
- Wallingford Historical Society
- Waterbury Historical Society
- Waterford Historical Society
- Weathersfield Historical Society
- Wells Historical Society
- West Fairlee Historical Society
- West Rutland Historical Society
- West Windsor Historical Society
- Westfield Historical Society
- Westford Historical Society
- Westminster Historical Society
- Weston Historical Society
- Whitingham Historical Society
- Williamstown Historical Society
- Williston Historical Society
- Historical Society of Wilmington Vermont
- Historical Society of Windham County
- Winooski Historical Society
- Wolcott Historical Society
- Woodstock History Center
- Worcester Historical Society

== See also ==
- History of Vermont
- List of museums in Vermont
- National Register of Historic Places listings in Vermont
- List of historical societies in the United States
