= Bernadine Custer =

American painter

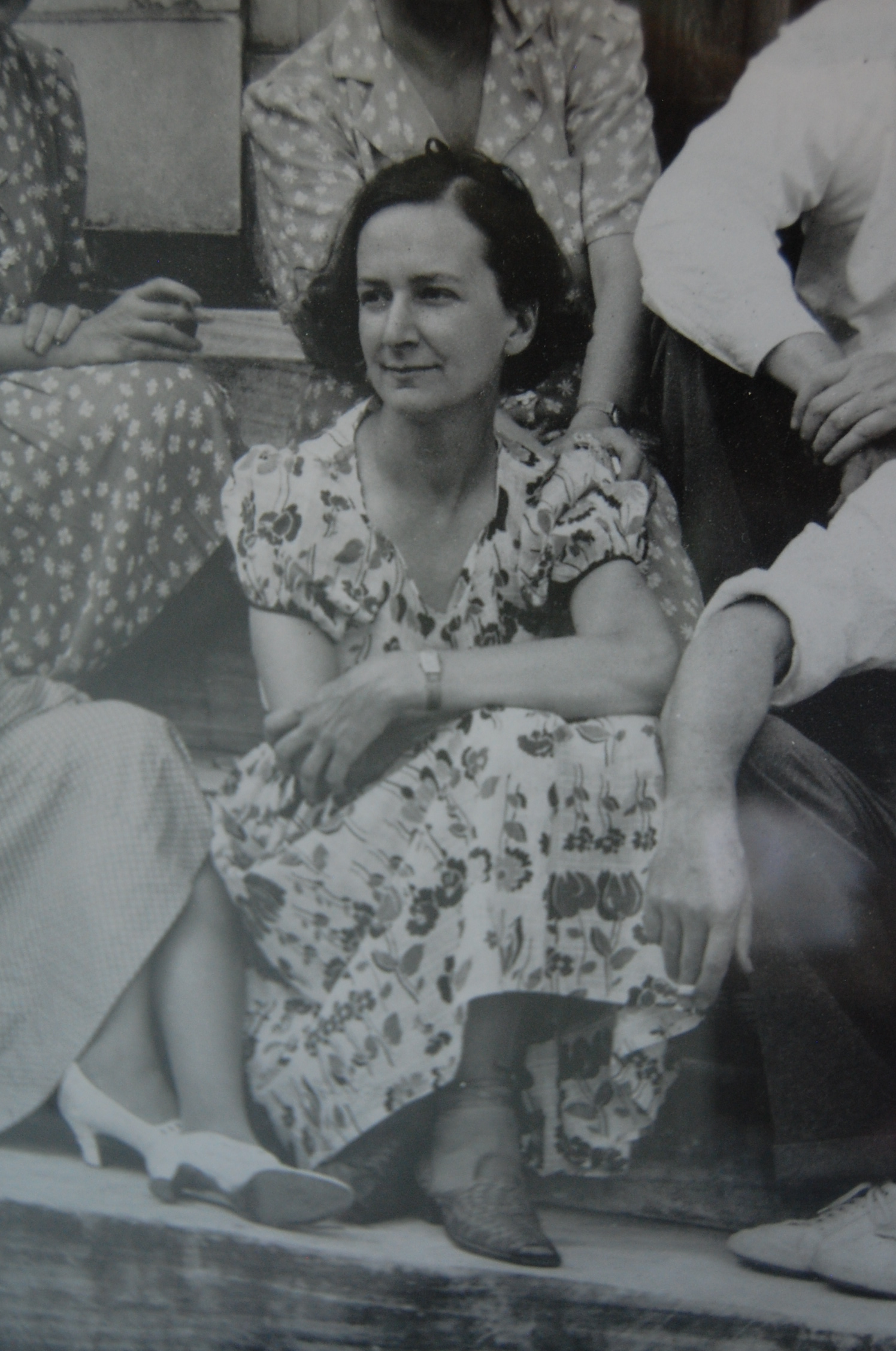
Bernadine Custer Sharp, photographed with the founders of the Southern Vermont Art Center, c. 1950s

Bernadine Custer (June 16, 1900 - November 2, 1991), also known as Bernadine Custer Sharp and Mrs. A.E. Sharp was a 20th-century American painter, illustrator and WPA muralist who worked in New York City and Vermont. Her artistic style has been described as "American Regionalism" and often features genre paintings and watercolors inspired by her neighbors and surroundings. Her work has been compared to other artists of her generation such as Thomas Hart Benton, Grant Wood, and Norman Rockwell.

== Early life and education ==
Born Anna Bernadine Custer on June 16, 1900, in Normal, Illinois, she was the second of five children of Frank and Lena Amstadt Custer. Custer began to hone her natural talents in her hometown as she attended Illinois State Normal University (now Illinois State University) for two years. She continued her education at the Art Institute of Chicago. Following her college years, she returned to teach and perform special projects at her alma maters.

== Career ==
In 1928, Custer's ties to the life of a working artist were reinforced through her marriage to British-born commercial artist Arthur Ernest “Jimmy” Sharp (May 20, 1886 - December 10, 1967). Sharp and Custer met while attending an artist's retreat in the sand dunes of Saugatuck, Michigan. The couple spent a year abroad, studying art in London and Paris before returning to settle in New York City in 1930.

Custer divided her time teaching at the Pratt Institute, creating her own artwork, and producing commercial and editorial art for a number of magazines such as The New Yorker, Pageant, Seventeen, New Republic, Fiction Parade, and Survey Geographic. She also enjoyed steady work as a pictorial reporter for the New York Herald-Tribune, covering the city's orchestral events.

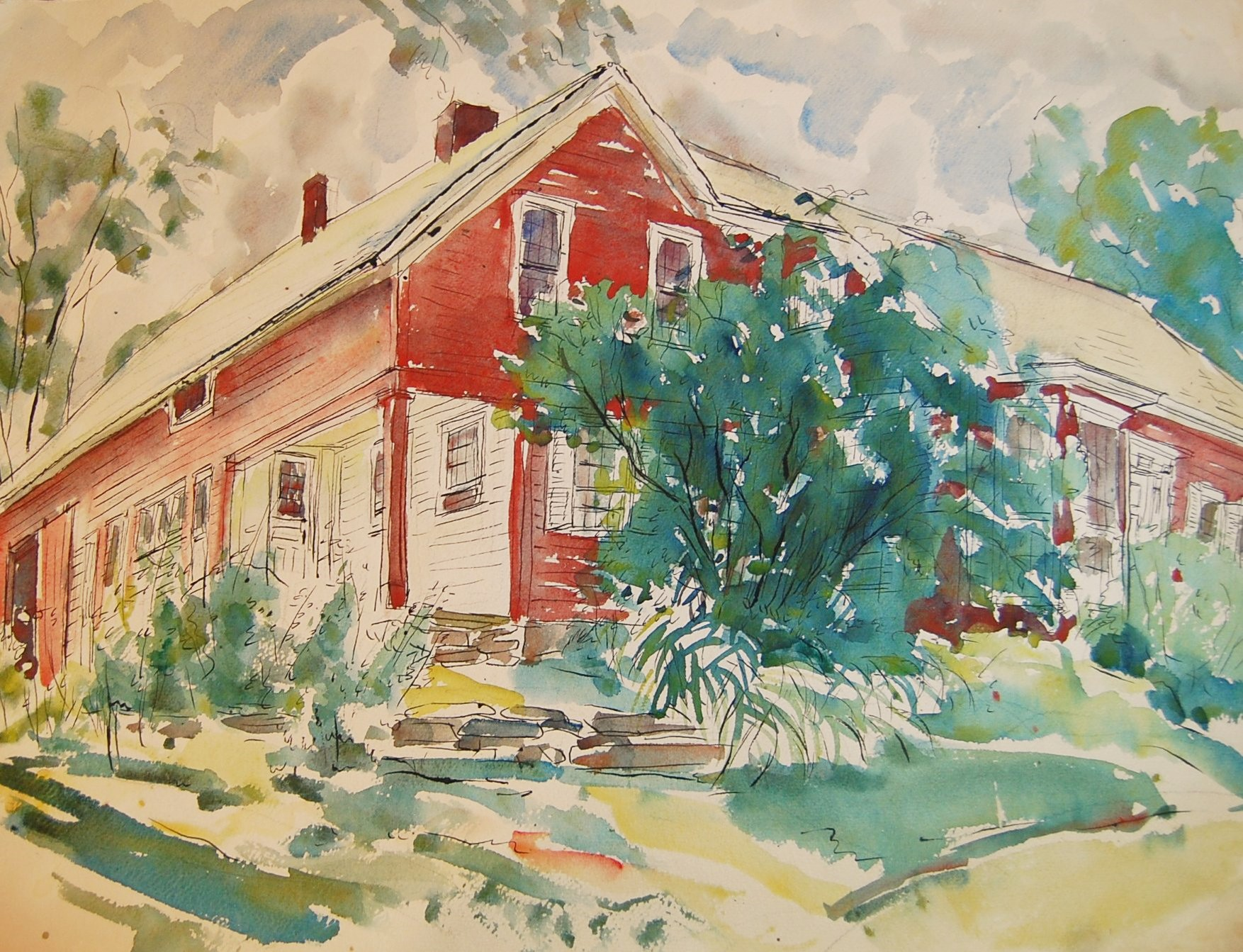
Ink and watercolor drawing (c. 1960s) of Custer's summer home in Londonderry, VT. She bequeathed the home to the Londonderry Arts and Historical Society upon her death.

== Exhibitions ==
In addition to her commercial efforts, Custer's career was even more prolific as a gallery artist. Her larger exhibition credits include the Chicago Art Institute Annual, the Corcoran Biennial Exhibition, the Cincinnati Museum Annual, the Brooklyn Museum International Watercolor Show, the Pennsylvania Academy Annual Exhibition, and the Philadelphia Watercolor Club shows, among others. She often showed work in exhibits with the Contemporary Arts Gallery and New York's Midtown Gallery, including single-artist shows. Custer's work can be found in the permanent collections of the Metropolitan Museum of Art, the Brooklyn Museum of Art, the Smithsonian Museum of American Art, the Whitney Museum, the Detroit Institute of Arts, the Addison Gallery of American Art, and Williams College.

== Murals ==
Custer was twice awarded mural commissions for the Treasury Art Project under the Roosevelt administration's New Deal; her murals can be seen at the post offices of Woodstock, VT and Summerville, SC. She remained affiliated with the Treasury Art Project, and its descendants, the Federal Artist's Project and the Public Works of Art Project, until they were dissolved in 1943. Two of Custer's watercolors were among the federally sponsored artworks that were allocated to the T. W. Wood Gallery in Montpelier, Vermont, and they remain in this museum's permanent collection. Custer's preferred medium was a combination of pen-and-ink with watercolor, which allowed her to add a sense of frantic energy to her work. Like many female artists, her subject matter was often focused on her daily surroundings.

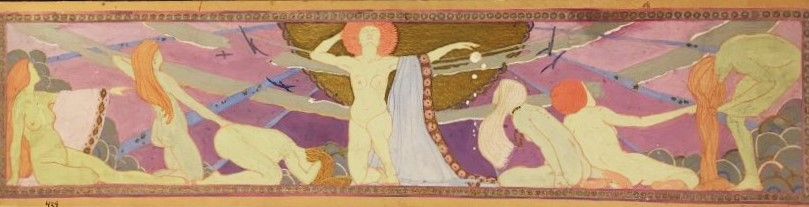
Bernadine Custer Sharp, Study for a Mural, c. 1930s, from the Collection of the Londonderry Arts and Historical Society

== Later years ==
Custer and her husband divided their time between New York City and Londonderry, VT, where they restored an 1840 farmhouse. In Vermont, Custer and Sharp were dedicated members of the Southern Vermont Arts Center. Bernadine Custer died on November 2, 1991, in Ludlow, Vermont. Upon her death, she bequeathed her Londonderry farmhouse to the Londonderry Arts and Historical Society. The Londonderry Historical Society now runs the Bernadine Custer Sharp House as a temporary gallery space during the summer months. The Historical Society also holds much of her artwork in their collection. Custer's personal papers can be found at the University of Vermont.

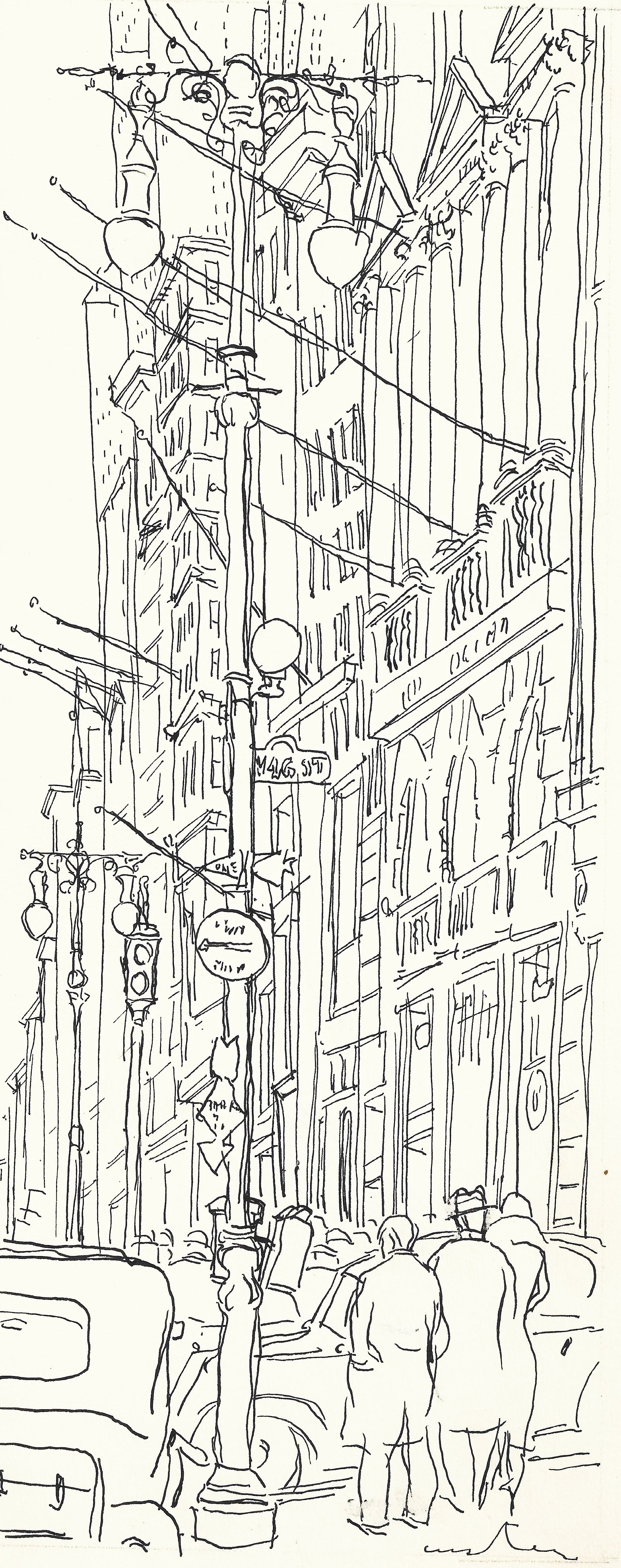
Bernadine Custer Sharp, New York City, 46th Street, c.1930s, from the Collection of the Londonderry Arts and Historical Society
