= Stowe Historical Society =

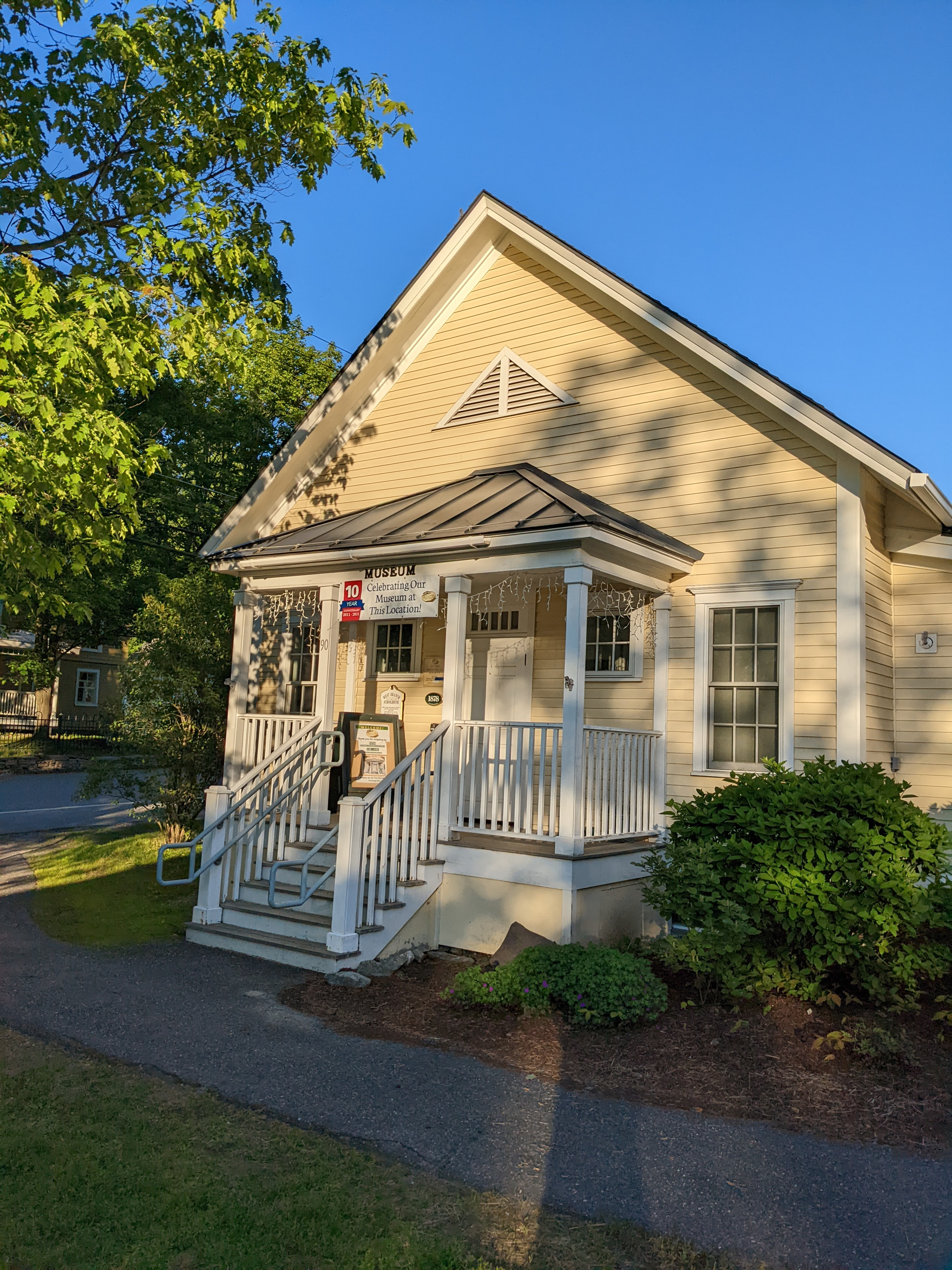
- West Branch Schoolhouse, 2022
- Established: April 17, 1956 (70 years ago)
- Location: 90 School Street; Stowe, Vermont, United States
- Coordinates: 44.46400208°N 72.6845792°W
- Type: Historical society and museum
- President: Barbara Baraw
- Website: www.stowehistoricalsociety.org

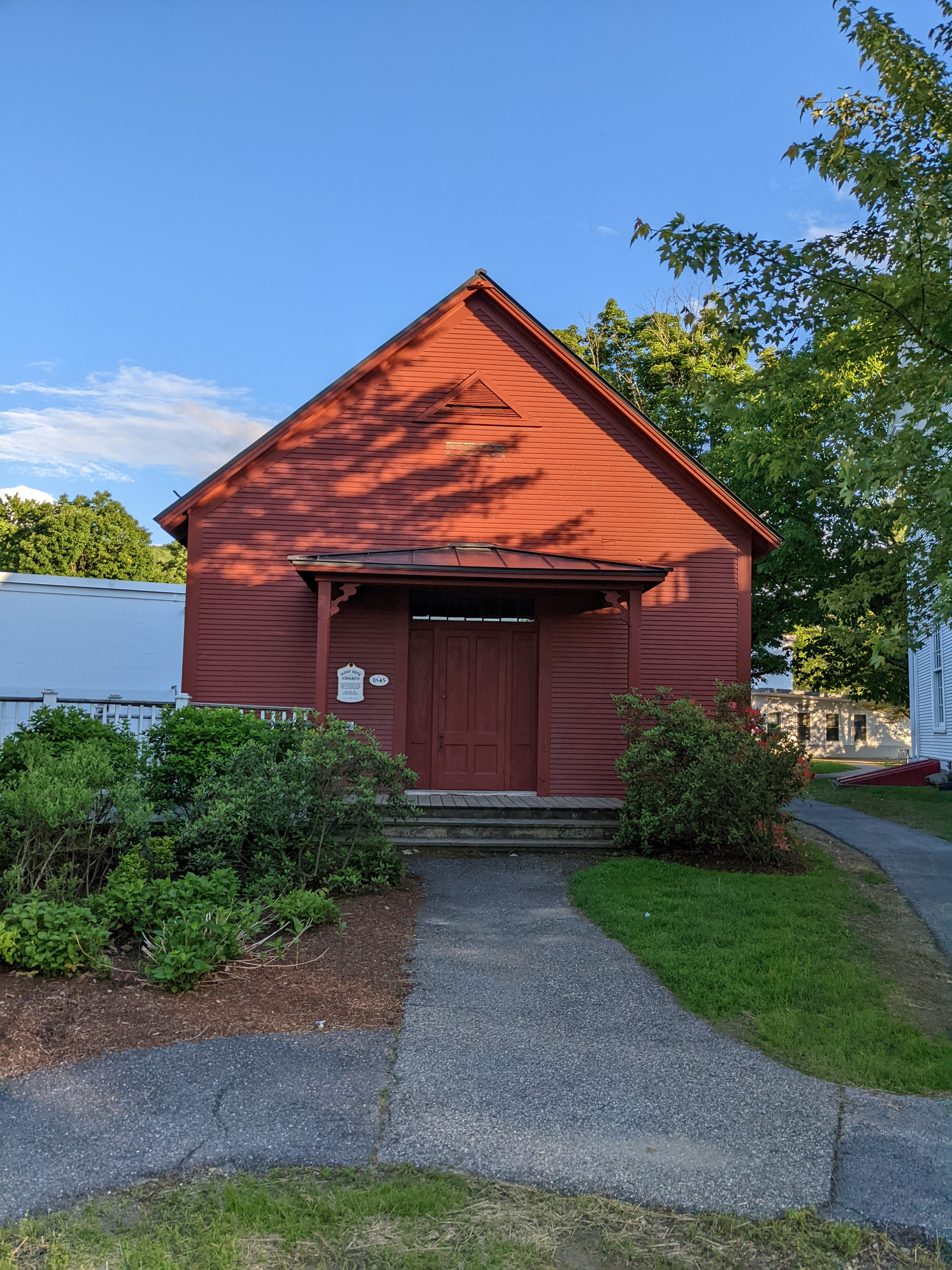
Bloody Brook Schoolhouse, 2022

Stowe Historical Society is a local historical society formed in 1956 to record and study the history of Stowe, Vermont, United States. It is run by fourteen volunteers, and its president is Barbara Baraw.

In 1955, members of Stowe's oldest families convened in an attempt to record and preserve the town's past, for fear its legacy would be lost.

With the help of Vermont Historical Society, Stowe Historical Society was formed on April 17, 1956, in the town's Memorial Building. It is now one of Vermont's largest non-profit sources of the state's history. The society is based in two one-room former schoolhouses on School Street, adjacent to another former school, the Helen Day Memorial Library and Art Center. One is the former West Branch Schoolhouse, a district school which was moved to its current location in 2009; the other is the Bloody Brook Schoolhouse, another district school which was moved to its new home in 1909.

== See also ==
- List of historical societies in Vermont
