= Vermont Transit Lines =

American bus carrier company

- Company type: Subsidiary
- Founded: 1929; 96 years ago
- Founder: William Appleyard
- Defunct: April 1, 2008
- Fate: Absorbed into parent
- Headquarters: Burlington, Vermont, United States
- Area served: New England
- Parent: Greyhound Lines (from 1975)

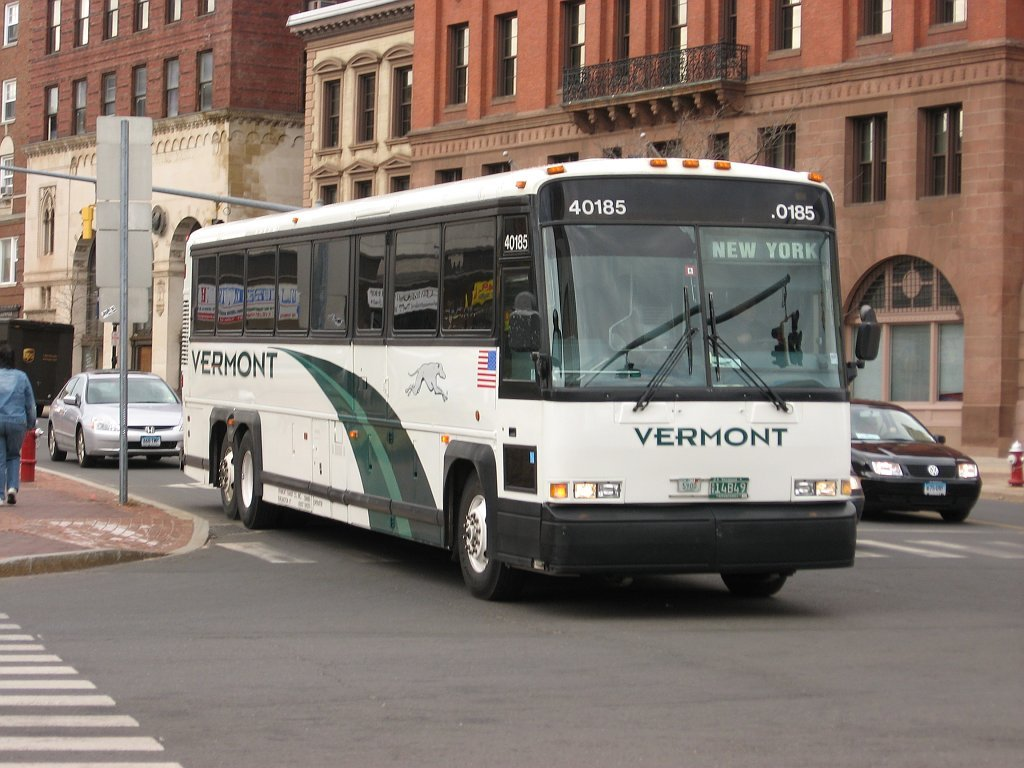
Coach number 40185 departs New Britain, CT on a Burlington, VT-New York City line run.

Vermont Transit Lines (VTL) was a bus carrier company serving New England. Founded in 1929 by William Appleyard, it originally linked the communities of Barre and Burlington, Vermont, with stops along the route. VTL grew to add destinations throughout the state, and added routes to Montreal, Quebec; to Boston and Springfield, Massachusetts; and to Maine and New Hampshire.

== History ==
=== Acquisition by Greyhound Lines ===
In 1975 VTL was purchased by Greyhound Lines, becoming a subsidiary line. Vermont Transit Lines remained based in Burlington, Vermont, with major terminals in White River Junction, Montreal and Boston. Service was primarily provided along the Interstate 89 corridor and then on to Boston.

=== Discontinuance of the Vermont Transit brand ===
On April 1, 2008, Greyhound Lines ceased use of the Vermont Transit Lines brand fully consolidating VTL routes into its operations timetable. Vermont Transit Routes 62 (Montreal-Burlington-White River Junction-Boston), 67 (White River Junction-Springfield) and 60 (Bangor-Boston) remain in the Greyhound national network.

== Identity and livery ==
For most of the company's history, Vermont Transit's identity has been closely tied to the state of Vermont. Drivers wore uniforms in Vermont's state colors of green and gold, with a cloisonne tie clasp of the Vermont coat of arms.

The fleet of buses were painted in a combination of green, gold and black, and several displayed the running greyhound logo albeit in green outline. Until consolidation with Greyhound Lines, seats were upholstered in a custom woven twill of green, gold, and black.

== Fleet ==
Like its parent company, Vermont Transit Lines primarily operated buses built by Motor Coach Industries, and some by the Belgian coach builder Van Hool.
