= History of Vermont =

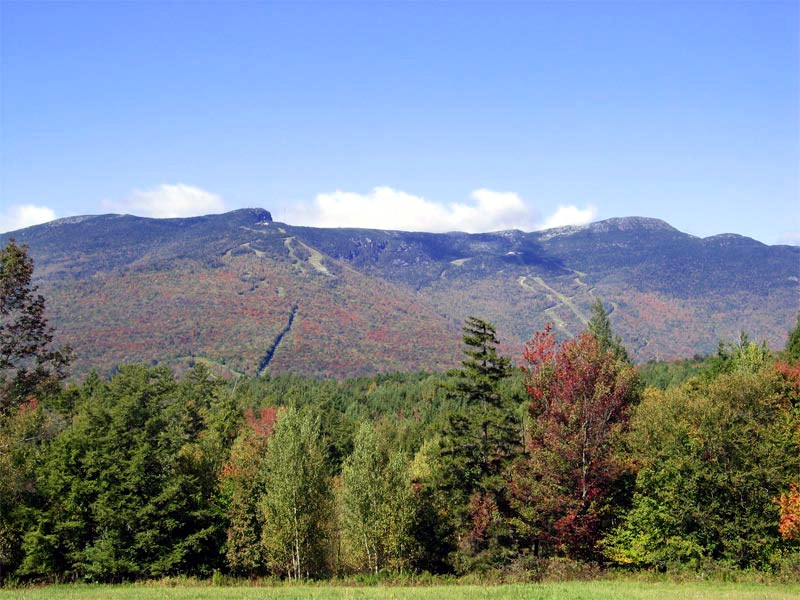
Mount Mansfield, at 4,393 feet (1,339 m), is the highest-elevation point in Vermont. Other high points are Killington Peak, Mount Ellen, Mount Abraham, and Camel's Hump. The lowest point in the state is Lake Champlain at 95 feet (29 m). The state's average elevation is 1,000 feet (300 m).

The geologic history of Vermont begins more than 450 million years ago during the Cambrian and Devonian periods.

Human history of Native American settlement can be divided into the hunter-gatherer Archaic Period, from c. 7000–1000 BC, and the sedentary Woodland Period, from c. 1000 BC to AD 1600. Vermont was admitted to the United States as the fourteenth state in 1791 after a brief period of sovereignty following the American Revolutionary War. Vermont experienced rising abolitionist sentiment and subsequently fought for the Union side in the American Civil War.

Vermont experienced significant demographic changes from the mid-19th century through 1980. The mid-1800s brought waves of Irish, Scottish, and Italian immigrants who joined the predominantly English and French Canadian population, with many working in Barre's granite industry. European immigration peaked between 1890-1900, with Italian and Scottish women often operating boarding houses to help newcomers integrate.

Early 20th century tensions emerged as Protestant Anglo-Americans worried about rural decline and growing Catholic populations from continued Irish, Italian, and French Canadian immigration. Despite these social tensions, Vermont saw remarkable population growth between 1970-1980, increasing from 444,732 to 511,456 residents - a 15% jump representing the largest growth since the Revolutionary War era.. Vermont established itself as a progressive leader in the 21st century through landmark legislation. It pioneered LGBTQ+ rights by becoming the first state to introduce civil unions in 2000 and the first to voluntarily legalize same-sex marriage in 2009 without court pressure. Vermont also led on cannabis reform, becoming the first state to legalize recreational marijuana through legislative action in 2018, while also being the ninth state to allow medical marijuana use.

== Geological and marine history ==
Vermont was covered with shallow seas periodically from the Cambrian to Devonian periods. Most of the sedimentary rocks laid down in these seas were deformed by mountain-building. Fossils, however, are common in the Lake Champlain region. Lower areas of western Vermont have flooded again, as part of the St. Lawrence Valley and Champlain Valley by Lake Vermont whose northern boundary followed the melting glacier at the end of the last ice age until it reached the ocean. This was replaced by Lake Vermont and the Champlain Sea, when the land had not yet rebounded from the weight of the glaciers which were sometimes 2 miles (3.2 km) thick. Shells of salt-water mollusks, along with the bones of beluga whales, have been found in the Lake Champlain region.

Lake Vermont is connected to a glacial western lake near what is now the Great Lakes. They allowed western fish to enter the state, which is why Vermont has more native species than any other New England State, 78. About half of these are western in origin.

Little is known of the pre-Columbian history of Vermont. Between 8500 and 7000 BC, glacial activity created the saltwater Champlain Sea. This event caused lamprey, Atlantic salmon, and rainbow smelt to become landlocked.

== Native American period ==
Native Americans inhabited and hunted in Vermont. From 7000 to 1000 BC was the Archaic Period. During that era, Native Americans migrated year-round. From 1000 BC to 1600 AD was the Woodland Period, when villages and trade networks were established, and ceramic and bow and arrow technology were developed. The western part of the state became home to a small population of Algonquian-speaking tribes, including the Mohican and Abenaki peoples.

The Sokoki lived in what is now southern Vermont; the Cowasucks in northeastern Vermont.

Between 1534 and 1609, the Iroquois Mohawks drove many of the smaller native tribes out of the Champlain Valley, later using the area as a hunting ground and warring with the remaining Abenaki.

== Early European period ==
=== French exploration and settlement ===
French explorer Samuel de Champlain claimed the area of what is now Lake Champlain, giving the name, Verd Mont (Green Mountain) to the region he found, on a 1647 map. Evidence suggests that this name came into use among English settlers, before it morphed to "Vermont", ca. 1760.

To aid and impress his new Abenaki allies, Champlain shot and killed an Iroquois chief with an arquebus, July 29, 1609. While the Iroquois were already enemies with the Abenaki, they formed a permanent enmity with the French with this incident, ultimately costing the French the bulk of their most developed possessions in the New World, including the contested area of most of Vermont, at the conclusion of the French and Indian War in 1763.

France claimed Vermont as part of New France, and erected Fort Sainte Anne on Isle La Motte in 1666 as part of their fortification of Lake Champlain. This was the first European settlement in Vermont.

During the latter half of the 17th century, non-French settlers began to explore Vermont and its surrounding area. In 1690, a group of Dutch-British settlers from Albany under Captain Jacobus de Warm established the De Warm Stockade at Chimney Point (eight miles west of Addison). This settlement and trading post were directly across the lake from Crown Point, New York (Pointe à la Chevelure).

There were regular periods of skirmishing between English colonies to the south and the French colony to the north, and the area of Vermont was an unsettled frontier. In 1704, De Rouville passed up the Winooski (Onion) River, to reach the Connecticut, and then down to Deerfield, Massachusetts, which he raided.

=== British settlement ===
During Father Rale's War, the first permanent British settlement was established in 1724 with the construction of Fort Dummer in Vermont's far southeast under the command of Lieutenant Timothy Dwight of Connecticut. This fort protected the nearby settlements of Dummerston and Brattleboro in the surrounding area. These settlements were made by people from Massachusetts and Connecticut. The second British settlement at Bennington in the southwest corner of Vermont would not be made until after 37 years of conflict in the region.

In 1725, 60 armed men entered Vermont with rough maps, with the goal of attacking the Village of St. Francis, but turned back at Crown Point.

In 1731, the French arrived at Chimney Point, near Addison. Here they constructed a small temporary wooden stockade (Fort de Pieux) until work on Fort St. Frédéric began in 1734. When this fort was completed, Fort de Pieux was abandoned as unneeded.

There was another period of conflict from 1740 to 1748, the War of the Austrian Succession or King George's War. There were raids at a private defensive work, Bridgeman's Fort, in Vernon, Vermont.

During the French and Indian War, 1755–1761, some Vermont settlers joined the colonial militia assisting the British in attacks on the French at Fort Carillon.

Rogers' Rangers staged an attack against the Abenaki village of Saint-Francis, Quebec from Lake Champlain in 1759. Separating afterwards, they fled the angered French and Abenakis through northern Vermont back to safety in Lake Champlain and New Hampshire.

Following France's loss in the French and Indian War, the 1763 Treaty of Paris gave control of the whole region to the British. Colonial settlement was limited by the British to lands east of the Appalachians, and Vermont was divided nearly in half in a jagged line running from Fort William Henry on Lake George diagonally north-eastward to Lake Memphremagog. Lands north of this line, including the entire Champlain Valley, were reserved for Indians. During this time French families were largely driven out, although scholars of the Vermont Archaeological Society have questioned if a French influence was removed completely, noting some remote farms may have eluded the notice of the British colonists.

== New Hampshire Grants, New York's claim, and the Vermont Republic ==
The end of the war brought new settlers to Vermont. The first settler of the grants was Samuel Robinson, who began clearing land in Bennington in 1761.

In the 28 years from 1763 to 1791, the non-Indian population of Vermont rose from 300 to 85,000.

A fort at Crown Point had been built in 1759, and the Crown Point Military Road stretched across the Green Mountains from Springfield to Chimney Point, making traveling from the neighboring British colonies easier than ever before. Three colonies laid claim to the area. The Province of Massachusetts Bay claimed the land on the basis of the 1629 charter of the Massachusetts Bay Colony. The Province of New York claimed Vermont based on land granted to the Duke of York (later King James II & VII) in 1664. (The Connecticut River was also the eastern boundary of 1616 claim by Dutch colonists, though the British-Dutch border near the Atlantic Ocean would later be adjusted considerably.) The Province of New Hampshire, whose western limits had never been determined, also claimed Vermont, in part based upon a decree of George II in 1740. On March 5, 1740, George II ruled that Massachusetts's northern boundary in this area would be its present location - due west from a point three miles due north of Pawtucket Falls on the Merrimack River. The boundary was surveyed by Richard Hasen in 1741, and Fort Dummer (Brattleboro), was found to be north of the line. Provisions and support for Fort Dummer were ordered by the Colonial Office from New Hampshire in the following years.

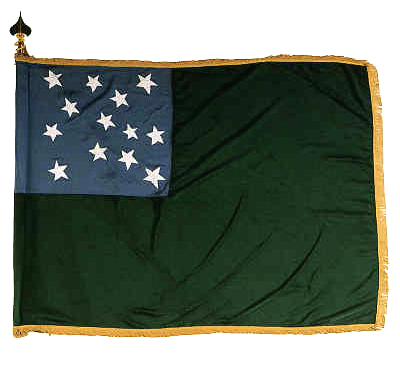
The flag of the Green Mountain Boys

New Hampshire's governor, Benning Wentworth, issued a series of 135 land grants between 1749 and 1764 called the New Hampshire Grants. Many of these were in a large valley on the west (or New York side) of the Green Mountains and only about forty miles from Albany. The town was laid out in 1749 and was settled after the war in 1761. The town was named Bennington for Wentworth. The location of the town was well north of the Massachusetts limit set by decree in 1740, and east of the known eastern limit of New York, twenty miles east of the Hudson River. Ultimately, by 1754, Wentworth had granted lands for 15 towns.

On July 20, 1764, King George III signed an Order in Council to establish various boundaries to quell disputes among the North American colonies. The boundary between the Province of New York and the Province of Quebec was set at the 45th parallel north, from the Connecticut River to the St. Lawrence River. George gave the land west of the Connecticut River to New York, reasoning that the wealthier province would act as a buffer between the expansionist New Hampshire and the Catholic, French-speaking Quebecois. Under this decree, Albany County, New York, as it then existed, implicitly gained the land presently known as Vermont. Although the exact line was later disputed, the river is still the modern boundary between New Hampshire and Vermont.

New York took the declaration of 1764 to apply retroactively, and considered the New Hampshire grants invalid. It therefore required land holders to purchase new grants for the same land from New York. New York then created counties in the region, with courthouses, sheriffs, and jails, and began judicial proceedings against those who held land solely by New Hampshire grants.

In 1767, the Privy Council forbade New York from selling land in Vermont that was in conflict with grants from New Hampshire, reversing the 1764 decision.

In 1770, Ethan Allen—along with his brothers Ira and Levi, as well as Seth Warner—recruited an informal militia, the Green Mountain Boys, to protect the interests of the original New Hampshire settlers against the new migrants from New York. A significant standoff occurred at the Breakenridge farm in Bennington, when a sheriff from Albany arrived with a posse of 750 men to dispossess Breakenridge. The residents raised a body of about 300 armed men to resist. The Albany sheriff demanded Breakenridge, and was informed, "If you attempt it, you are a dead man." The sheriff returned to Albany.

When a New York judge arrived in Westminster with New York settlers in March 1775, violence broke out as angry citizens took over the courthouse and called a sheriff's posse. This resulted in the deaths of Daniel Houghton and William French in the "Westminster Massacre". In the summer of 1776, the first general convention of freemen of the New Hampshire Grants met in Dorset, Vermont, resolving "to take suitable measures to declare the New Hampshire Grants a free and independent district."

On January 15, 1777, representatives of the New Hampshire Grants convened in Westminster and declared their land an independent republic, the Vermont Republic. For the first six months of the republic's existence, the state was called New Connecticut. On June 2, a second convention of 72 delegates met at Westminster, known as the "Westminster Convention". At this meeting, the delegates adopted the name "Vermont" on the suggestion of Dr. Thomas Young of Philadelphia, a supporter of the delegates who wrote a letter advising them on how to achieve statehood. The delegates set the time for a meeting one month later. On July 4, the Constitution of Vermont was drafted during a violent thunderstorm at the Windsor Tavern owned by Elijah West. It was adopted by the delegates on July 8 after four days of debate. This was the first written constitution in North America to provide for the abolition of slavery (for adults), suffrage for men who did not own land, and public schools. (See also History of slavery in Vermont.) The tavern has been preserved as the Old Constitution House, administered as a state historic site. Violations of the abolition of slavery persisted for some time.

The production of potash in the late 18th and early 19th centuries, resulted in the deforestation of much of Vermont.

=== Slavery in Vermont ===
The population of enslaved Americans in Vermont was calculated to be 25 in 1770 according to the United States Census Bureau's Bicentennial Edition Historical Statistics of the United States: Colonial Times to 1970 and was recorded at 16 in 1790 according to a contemporary study Return of the Whole Number of Persons Within the Several Districts of the United States. The overall population of Vermont was lower than the average of the individual Thirteen Colonies.

== American Revolutionary War (1775–1783) ==
The battles of Bennington and Saratoga are recognized as the turning point in the American Revolutionary War. Both were fought in New York territory near the Vermont border, while Vermont (or New Connecticut) was an independent republic, and successfully defended its territory with cooperation of the colonies that had already joined the United States. They were the first major defeat of a British army and convinced France that the American rebels were worthy of military aid. General John Stark, who commanded the rebel forces at the Battle of Bennington, became widely known as the "Hero of Bennington". "Bennington Battle Day" (August 16, the anniversary of the battle) is a legal holiday in Vermont. Under the portico of the Vermont Statehouse, next to a granite statue of Ethan Allen, there is a brass cannon that was captured at Bennington.

During the summer of 1777, the invading British army of General John Burgoyne slashed its way southward through the thick forest, from Quebec to the Hudson River, captured the strategic stronghold of Fort Ticonderoga, and drove the Continental Army into a desperate southward retreat. Raiding parties of British soldiers and native warriors freely attacked, pillaged and burned the frontier communities of the Champlain Valley and threatened all settlements to the south. The Vermont frontier collapsed in the face of the British invasion. The New Hampshire legislature, fearing an invasion from the west, mobilized the state's militia under the command of General John Stark.

General Burgoyne received intelligence that large stores of horses, food and munitions were kept at Bennington, which was the largest community in the land grant area. He dispatched 2,600 troops, nearly a third of his army, to seize the colonial storehouse there, unaware that General Stark's New Hampshire troops were then traversing the Green Mountains to join up at Bennington with the Vermont continental regiments commanded by Colonel Seth Warner, together with the local Vermont and western Massachusetts militia. The combined American forces, under Stark's command, attacked the British column at Hoosick, New York, just across the border from Bennington. General Stark reportedly challenged his troops to fight to the death, telling them that: "There are your enemies, the redcoats and the Tories. They are ours, or this night Molly Stark sleeps a widow!" In a desperate, all-day battle fought in intense summer heat, the army of Yankee farmers defeated the British, killing or capturing 900 soldiers. Burgoyne never recovered from this loss and eventually surrendered at Saratoga on October 17.

Some armed conflict did occur on Vermont territory, including the Battle of Hubbardton.

In 1778, David Redding, convicted of being a traitor to the colonies and a spy for the British, was hanged in Bennington.

The first printing press in the state was established in Dresden in 1779.

== Sovereignty (1777–1791) ==
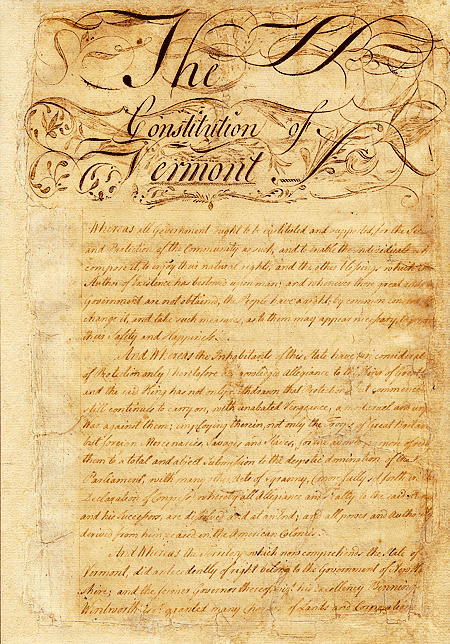
Vellum manuscript of the Constitution of Vermont, 1777. This constitution was amended in 1786, and again in 1793, two years after Vermont's admission to the federal union in 1791. See Constitution of Vermont (1777) and Constitution of Vermont.

The Republic of Vermont continued to govern itself as a sovereign entity based in the southeastern town of Windsor for 14 years. Thomas Chittenden acted as chief magistrate of Vermont from 1778 to 1789 and from 1790 to 1791. In the 1780s Chittenden, the Allen brothers, and other political leaders engaged in negotiations with Frederick Haldimand, the British governor of Quebec over the possibility of Vermont becoming a British province. These negotiations ultimately failed in part due to the timely surrender of Cornwallis at Yorktown in 1781.

The first General Assembly voted to establish two counties, Bennington in the west and Unity in the east. It adopted the common law of England as the basis for its legal system. It voted to confiscate Tory lands and sell them to finance the militia. This was the first "tax" passed in the state.

The first newspaper was published in the state in 1781, the weekly Vermont Gazette.

In 1784, the state established a postal service linking several towns and Albany, New York.

In 1786, the Vermont governor replied to requests from Massachusetts about the Shays' Rebellion, saying that he was willing to extradite members of the rebellion, though his response was "pro forma" only since the state could ill afford to discourage immigration.

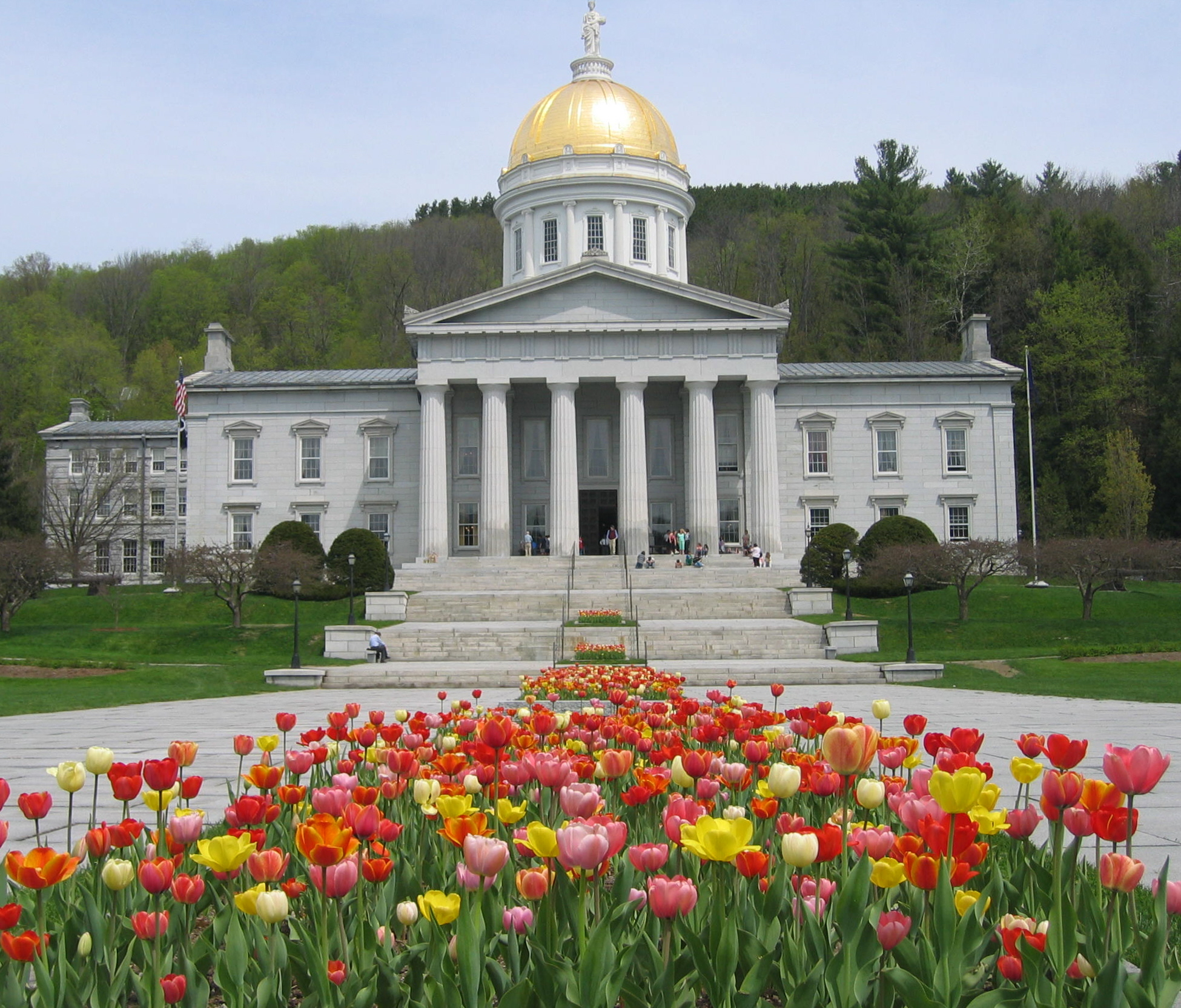
The gold leaf dome of the Vermont State House in Montpelier is visible for many miles around the city. This is the third State House on the site, and like the second, was built in the Greek Revival architectural style. It was completed in 1857. Montpelier became the state capital in 1805.

== Admission to the Union ==
The Vermont Republic was initially denied recognition as the 14th colony by the Continental Congress, due to objections by New York (which had auctioned off some land in the disputed territory) and New Hampshire. Congress forbade Vermont authorities from exercising jurisdiction over what it considered to be residents of New York, and protested defiance of those orders.

During the Haldimand Affair (1780-1783), representatives from Vermont negotiated for a separate peace and possible return to British rule, raising accusations of treason. From the perspective of Vermont, this tactic reduced the chances of British invasion of Vermont, and put pressure on the United States to recognize Vermont and give it representation in the Continental Congress. From the British perspective, invasion of Canada was less likely if Vermont and the United States were at odds.

Negotiations for membership in the United States were complicated, with Congress considering the matter repeatedly from 1777 to 1785. Vermont expanded its territorial claims to include towns on the east side of the Connecticut River who were dissatisfied with New Hampshire government. The "east side Yorkers" on the west side of the Connecticut River near Brattleboro petitioned for rejoining New York. Various proposals were made for Vermont to get statehood in return for relinquishing its expanded territorial claims and resolving the land sale disputes with New York. New Hampshire gave up its claim to Vermont with a boundary agreement in 1782.

The 1783 Treaty of Paris with the British recognized Vermont's territory as part of the United States, though Vermont did not recognize the authority of the United States. Congress approved invasion of Vermont in 1783 to force it to submit to New York rule, but this was scuttled by George Washington, who favored recognition as a state to fighting the Green Mountain Boys who had helped the United States defeat the British.

In 1787, Alexander Hamilton proposed in the New York legislature that the state endorse admission of the free state of Vermont in order to counterbalance the anticipated admission of Kentucky as a slave state. In 1789, Congress recognized Vermont with a western boundary of Lake Champlain, the Poultney River, and continuation of a buffer approximately 20 miles east of the Hudson River (as was done for Connecticut and Massachusetts). The New York state legislature agreed in 1790 to admit Vermont in return for a $30,000 payment to resolve the land auction dispute. In 1791, Vermont joined the federal Union as the fourteenth state—becoming the first state to enter the Union after the original Thirteen Colonies. Kentucky was admitted to the Union the following year.

== Antebellum era (1791–1861) ==
In June 1791, Thomas Jefferson and James Madison toured the state.

Because of the proximity of Canada, Vermonters were somewhat alarmed during the War of 1812. Five thousand troops were stationed in Burlington at one point, outnumbering residents. Contemporary reports indicate that almost 1,300 soldiers were treated for various ailments and over 100 died between May 1814 and April 1815. An expeditionary force of Quebec Eastern Townships' volunteers destroyed a barracks built at Derby with no personnel casualties. The war, fought over what seemed like obscure maritime considerations to landlocked Vermont, was not popular.

In July 1830, the state experienced what turned out to be the worst flood of the 19th century. It was called the "Torrent of 1830".

Merino sheep were introduced in 1812. This ultimately resulted in a boom-bust cycle for wool. Wool reached a price of 57 cents/pound in 1835. By 1837, there were 1,000,000 sheep in the state. The price of wool dropped to 25 cents/pound in the late 1840s. The state could not withstand more efficient competition from western states, and sheep raising collapsed.

Vermont had a unicameral legislature until 1836.

In June 1843, escaped slaves hid at a Shaftsbury farm, in the first recorded instance in Vermont of the Underground Railroad.

In 1846, the ground was broken for the construction of the first railroad in Vermont, Central Vermont Railway, in Northfield.

In 1853, Vermont passed a strict law prohibiting the consumption of alcoholic beverages. Some towns followed the law, while others ignored it.

An 1854 Vermont Senate report on slavery echoed the Vermont Constitution's first article, on the rights of all men, questioning how a government could favor the rights of one people over another. The report fueled growth of the abolition movement in the state, and in response, a resolution from the Georgia General Assembly authorized the towing of Vermont out to sea. The mid to late 1850s saw a transition from Vermonters mostly favoring slavery's containment, to a far more serious opposition to the institution. As the Whig party shriveled, Vermont changed its allegiance to the emergent Republican Party. In 1860, it voted for President Abraham Lincoln, giving him the largest margin of victory of any state.

French-Canadian immigration began in the first decades of the nineteenth century. Already, in the 1810s, Burlington had a French-Canadian population of approximately 100. Those numbers began to rise rapidly in the 1820s and 1830s as Lower Canada (present-day Quebec) navigated economic and political crises. Immigration continued to the end of the century and resumed in the late 1910s and 1920s; it is the continued arrival of French Canadians and Irish that kept Vermont's population from dropping in the second half of the nineteenth century. French Canadians found employment in agriculture, in the factories of Burlington and Winooski, in the quarries of Rutland and Barre, in the rail yards of St. Johnsbury and St. Albans, and in other sectors. At times they clashed with the Irish over the control of Catholic Church resources and with various groups in labor disputes. The nativism with which they contended was often less overt than in other states.

== American Civil War (1861–1865) ==
More than 28,100 Vermonters served in Vermont volunteer units. Vermont fielded 17 infantry regiments, one cavalry regiment, three light artillery batteries, one heavy artillery company, three companies of sharpshooters, and two companies of frontier cavalry. Instead of replacing units as they were depleted, Vermont regularly provided recruits to bring the units in the field back up to normal strength. Many of the soldiers had never been out of their own county, much less the state. In the South, they felt like they were on another planet.

In 1863, there was rioting in West Rutland after the state instituted a draft.

Nearly 5,000 Vermonters served in other states' units, in the United States Army or the United States Navy. The 54th Massachusetts Infantry (Colored) included 66 Vermont blacks; a total of 166 black Vermonters served out of a population of 709 in the state. Vermonters, if not Vermont units, participated in every major battle of the war.

Vermonters lost a total of 1,832 soldiers killed or mortally wounded in battle; another 3,362 died of disease, in prison or from other causes, for a total loss of 5,194. More than 2,200 Vermonters were taken prisoner during the war, and 615 of them died in, or as a result of, their imprisonment. Among the most famous of the Vermont units were the 1st Vermont Brigade, the 2nd Vermont Brigade, and the 1st Vermont Cavalry.

A large proportion of Vermont's state and national-level politicians for several decades after the Civil War were veterans.

The northernmost land action of the war, the St. Albans Raid, took place in Vermont.

== Postbellum era and beyond (1865–1900) ==
During the two decades following the end of the American Civil War (1865–1885) there was both economic expansion and contraction, and fairly dramatic social change.

Union veterans banded together into patriotic and fraternal organizations, mostly in the Grand Army of the Republic. There were 116 posts at one time.

Mills in Lowell, Massachusetts began staffing up. Recruiters were sent out all over New England, including Vermont. Initially they found ample workers from new widows, single parent heads of family. This demand was filled by August 1865, and recruiting Americans from Lowell ceased abruptly.

By 1860, the state was a leading producer of hops in the nation with 640,000 pounds (290,000 kg), second to New York. This crop conveniently arrived as a replacement for the disappearance of the Merino sheep trade. Hops, too, disappeared. A number of factors were involved: plant disease in 1909, migration of planting to California from 1853 to 1910, where growing was performed more efficiently, and Prohibition both at the state and national level.

Vermont's system of railroads expanded and was linked to national systems, agricultural output and export soared and incomes increased. But Vermont also felt the effects of recessions and financial panics, particularly the Panic of 1873 which resulted in a substantial exodus of young Vermonters. The transition in thinking about the rights of citizens, first brought to a head by the 1854 Vermont Senate report on slavery, and later Lincoln's Gettysburg Address in changing how citizens perceived civil rights, fueled agitation for women's suffrage. The first election in which women were allowed to vote was on December 18, 1880, when women were granted limited suffrage and were first allowed to vote in town elections, and then in state legislative races.

Starting around 1870, a number of Vermont towns dressed satirically for Independence Day in an Ancient and Horribles Parade. The intent was to deride politicians and other well-known figures. This largely died out by 1900.

== Twentieth century ==
In 1902, Vermonters approved a law for local option on the sale of alcoholic beverages, countermanding the prior law of 1853 which banned them entirely. That year 94 towns approved the sale of alcoholic beverages locally. The number of approving towns fell each year until there were only 18 in 1917, shortly before national prohibition became law.

In the 1920s, Ku Klux Klan membership skyrocketed in the state. In 1930, The Washington Post estimated as many as 80,301 Vermonters were members as of 1925; historians typically place the figure much lower, at between 2,000 and 10,000. The main target of their hatred were the French-Canadian Catholic immigrants. A eugenics project apparently targeted Indians, Indian-French Canadians, and Afro-Americans in the state for forced sterilization between 1931 and 1936.

In 1923, the state passed a law limiting the regular workweek of women and children to 58 hours.

Beaver populations were re-introduced to Vermont in 1924 and continue to thrive there today.

Large-scale flooding occurred in early November 1927. During this incident, 85 people died, 84 of them in Vermont.

The US Supreme Court decided that New Hampshire's boundary included most of the Connecticut River, establishing Vermont's eastern boundary in Vermont v. New Hampshire – 290 US 579 (1934).

Prior to 1935, 5.5 million sugar maples were tapped for syrup. Less expansive softwood was used to boil the sap to condense it to maple syrup. The 1938 New England hurricane in the fall of that year blew down 15,000,000 acres (61,000 km^{2}) of trees, one-third of the total forest at the time in New England. Three billion board feet were salvaged. Today many of the older trees in Vermont are about 75 years old, dating from after this storm. By 2017, the old record number of maples tapped for sugar had not been reached; there were over 2 million trees tapped. However, more syrup was produced using more efficient and less labor-intensive methods.

Hydropower supplied 90% of the state's power needs in 1940.

In September 1941, it looked like America would be involved in the World War which had started in 1939 in Europe. Seizing on a declaration by the U.S. president, the legislature authorized wartime-like payments to citizens involved with the military. This led to facetious headlines that Vermont had declared war on Germany.

About 6,000 Vermonters were in the military during World War II. About 874 of these died.

94 Vermonters died fighting the Korean War.

Widespread use of DDT to exterminate insect pests after the war led to the reduction of various wildlife, noticeably birds and larger wildlife, such as moose and bear. The pesticide was banned in 1972 eventually leading to the restoration of many birds and larger mammals. For example, the bear population doubled from the 1980s to 6,000 in 2013.

In 1964, the US Supreme Court forced "one-man, one-vote" redistricting on Vermont, giving cities an equitable share of votes in both houses for the entire country. Until that time, rural counties were often represented equally by area in state senates and were often unsympathetic to urban problems requiring increased taxes.

In 1965, the Northeast Blackout of 1965, the worst blackout until then, left Vermont without electricity for about 12 hours.

In 1968, the state took over welfare support for the indigent. This had formerly been the responsibility of the towns, under the Overseer of the Poor. This had been a nearly insupportable burden for many small towns. The last poor farm was closed.

A flood occurred in 1973, when the flood caused the death of two people and millions of dollars in property damage.

In 1984, the state had 2,500 square miles (6,500 km^{2}) in farmland. This declined to 1,900 square miles (4,900 km^{2}) in 2013.

== Since 2000 ==
On April 25, 2000, as a result of the Vermont Supreme Court's decision in Baker v. Vermont, the Vermont General Assembly passed and Governor Howard Dean signed into law H.0847, which provided the state-sanctioned benefits of marriage to gay and lesbian couples in the form of civil unions. Controversy over the civil unions bill was a central issue in the subsequent 2000 elections.

In 2001 Vermont produced 275,000 US gallons (1,040,000 L) of maple syrup, about 25% of U.S. production. For 2005 that number was 410,000 US gallons (1,600,000 L; 340,000 imp gal) accounting for 37% of national production.

In 2007, with three-quarters of the state opposing the Iraq War, the state nevertheless had the highest rate of war-related deaths in the nation. This was due to volunteers and participation by the Vermont National Guard.

Starting in 2007, during the Great Recession, state median household income dropped furthest, or second furthest, depending on how it is computed, of any state in the nation; from −3.2% or −10%, depending on whether a two-year or three-year moving average was used.

In 2011, Tropical Storm Irene caused widespread flooding, particularly in the southern part of the state, closing at least 260 roads. Federal assistance for recovery included $110 million for emergency relief and assistance, $102 million for federal highway repair, and $23 million for individual assistance within the state.

In 2014, the Center for Public Integrity rated Vermont last out of the 50 states for state government accountability and integrity. This was the result of the revelation of a continuing number of municipal scandals including the $1.6 million Hardwick Electric embezzlement.

Vermont is more heavily forested in 2017 than it was during the 19th and early 20th centuries. A new way of producing potash was found not requiring the intensive destruction of trees.

== Electoral history ==
=== Early period (1791–1860) ===
Though some members of the Federalist Party found electoral success, in its early years of statehood Vermont generally preferred the Jeffersonian Party, which became the Democratic Party in the early 1820s. Vermont stopped voting Democratic in the 1830s, initially over a fear of Jacksonian return to political parties; later, perhaps, over increasing opposition to the spread of slavery. The state voted Anti-Jackson, Anti-Masonic, Whig, and then Republican Party.

The Vermont legislature chose presidential electors through the general election of 1824. Vermont citizens first started voting directly for presidential electors in 1828.

=== Upward mobility for politicians (1830–1916) ===
In the 1830s Vermont was one of the strongholds of Anti-Masonry. While the party elected only one governor, William A. Palmer, it was able to prevent the other major parties from winning majorities in some statewide races, which meant that the Vermont General Assembly chose the winner.

From the founding of the Republican party in the mid-1850s until the 1958 election of William H. Meyer to the United States House of Representatives, Vermont elected only Republicans to statewide office.

Politicians aspiring to statewide office in Vermont normally had to be nominated at a state convention or "caucus." Factions dominated these caucuses. Some of these were family. A look at the list of governors, senators, and representatives over time shows the Chittendens, Fairbanks, Proctors, and Smiths. Nomination was tantamount to election. The state legislature chose US senators until 1913. Up to six seats in the US House of Representatives gave ambitious politicians an ample stage for their talent.

Until 1870, all state officials were elected for one-year terms. In 1870, the term was changed to two-years. Governors then normally served just one term of two years.

The Green Mountains effectively split Vermont in two. Culturally the eastern Vermonters were often descended from immigrants from New Hampshire. Western Vermonters often had their roots in New York. Recognizing this as a source of potential problems, politicians began following an unwritten "mountain rule", rotating the Lieutenant Governor and Governor residing in opposite sides of the state.

The first election in which women were allowed to vote was on December 18, 1880, when women were granted limited suffrage and were allowed to vote in school board elections.

=== Statewide primaries (1916–1946) ===
General annoyance with this system of selecting leadership by a few people, led to statewide primaries in 1916. Down to only one congressional seat to compete for, Governors started trying to serve two terms, beginning with Governor Weeks in 1927. This worked until World War II.

Senator Ernest Gibson, a Republican, died in 1940. Governor George Aiken, also a Republican, and a liberal ally of the Gibsons appointed the late Senator's son, Ernest W. Gibson Jr. to fill the seat until a special election for the remainder of the term. The younger Gibson did not run, enabling Aiken's election to the seat. Instead Gibson devoted himself to preparing the state for entry into World War II. He served in the South Pacific and emerged as a highly decorated Colonel. There was a tsunami in 1946 in American politics. Returning veterans were popular. Gibson ran an unprecedented campaign against the incumbent Governor, Mortimer R. Proctor, and ousted him in the primary. Gibson won the general election, won reelection in 1948, and served until resigning in 1950 to accept appointment as judge of the United States District Court for the District of Vermont.

=== Rise and fall of Republican Party dominance ===
For over a century, Vermont was the most reliably Republican state in the nation. From the party’s founding in 1854 until the mid-20th century, Republicans dominated Vermont’s political landscape at every level. However, a combination of demographic, economic, and political changes led to a dramatic reversal in the 1960s, transforming Vermont into one of the most progressive and Democratic-leaning states in the country.

The Vermont Republican Party was founded in 1854, absorbing the remnants of the Whig Party and quickly establishing itself as the dominant political force in the state. From 1854 to 1958, Republicans won every statewide election and every presidential contest in Vermont, making it the only state never to vote for a Democratic presidential candidate during this period. The party’s dominance was so complete that the Vermont legislature and most local offices were almost exclusively Republican, with Democrats and other parties rarely posing a serious challenge. A key to Republican control was the “Mountain Rule,” an informal agreement that alternated gubernatorial and U.S. Senate nominations between residents of eastern and western Vermont, with strict term limits. This arrangement ensured party unity, minimized factionalism, and kept powerful families—most notably the Proctors—at the center of Vermont politics. At a deeper level, Vermont’s Republicanism was rooted in the state’s rural, Protestant, and Yankee traditions. The party was seen as a guardian of order, thrift, and moral rectitude, and its dominance was rarely questioned. The rival Democrats were increasingly based among urban Catholics—Irish and French—who were industrial workers favoring labor unions.

=== Interregnum — Liberal Republicans prevail (1946–1962) ===
The elder Gibson, a former member of the Progressive Party, was the first of the liberal Republicans. While conservatives like Harold Arthur and Lee E. Emerson were elected Governor, they seem, in retrospect, to be transitory figures.

The "normal" path to the governorship for Republicans, which Ernest W. Gibson Jr. explicitly campaigned against in 1946, was to serve in the Vermont House of Representatives and hold a leadership position such as Speaker of the House; service in the Vermont State Senate and a leadership role such as President Pro Tem; election to the Lieutenant Governor's office; and election as Governor. Successful Republican candidates for the United States House of Representatives and United States Senate were also almost always veterans of leadership positions in the Vermont Legislature or statewide office.

=== Democratic dominance (1962–present) ===
The demographics of the state had changed. In 1960, 25% of the population was born outside the state. Most of these immigrants were from Democratic states and brought their voting inclinations with them. Anticipating this change, the Republicans conducted a massive free-for-all in 1958, the last good chance many of them saw to capture a congressional seat. They were wrong. Democrat William H. Meyer won, the first from his party in 102 years. In 1962, Philip Hoff was elected Governor, the first Democrat since before the Civil War.

While the climate had changed, the legislature had not. With one representative per town and two senators per county, the rural areas dominated and set the agenda much to the frustration of urban areas, particularly Chittenden County. In 1964, the US Supreme Court forced "one-man, one-vote" redistricting on Vermont, giving cities an equitable share of votes in both houses.

Unlike yesteryear, no party nominee can be assured of election. The unwritten "two term" rule has been jettisoned. Governors usually serve as long as they can, not being able to guarantee that their policies will be continued after they leave office. The List of governors of Vermont shows that since 1962, every outgoing governor has been succeeded by a governor of the other party.

== Infrastructure history ==
Transportation around this mountainous state was a challenge to the original colonists. While this challenge has been met in the current era by turnpikes and limited rail service, public transportation for the majority of Vermonters has often remained elusive.

The state highway system was created in 1931.

In 2008, the Vermont Transit Lines, a subsidiary of Greyhound Lines went out of business. It had begun operating in 1973. Limited service continued under the direct aegis of Greyhound. This has been replaced by subsidized regional NGO corporations which provide limited service for most, but adequate service for those needing medical treatment.

== Religious history ==
In colonial times, like New England, Vermont's largest religious affiliation was Congregationalism. In 1776, 63% of affiliated church members in Vermont were Congregationalists. At that time, however, only 9% of people belonged to a specific church due to the remoteness of population centers.

In 2000, Catholics comprised 43% of the state population, followed by no religion at 24%. The remaining 33% were nearly all Protestants, led by Congregationalists at 6%; Methodists at 6%; Episcopalians at 5%; Baptists at 4%; and Christians at 4%.

== See also ==
- History of New England
- List of forts in Vermont
- List of governors of Vermont
- List of historical societies in Vermont
- List of United States representatives from Vermont
- List of United States senators from Vermont
- List of Vermont attorneys general
- Southern boundary of Vermont
- Vermont: State Resource Guide, from the Library of Congress
