= Harp (disambiguation) =

A harp is a type of stringed musical instrument.

Harp, harps, HARP, or variation, may also refer to:

== Art, entertainment, and media ==
=== Music ===
- Blues harp, a style of harmonica-playing in blues
- French harp, or harmonica
- Jew's harp or Jaw harp, an instrument that is placed in the performer's mouth and plucked
- String Quartet No. 10 (Beethoven), nicknamed the "Harp"
- HARP, a 1985 folk album, and an acronym of the artist names, Holly Near, Arlo Guthrie, Ronnie Gilbert, and Pete Seeger

=== Other arts, entertainment, and media ===
- Harp (magazine), a former music magazine
- "Harp", an episode of the television series Teletubbies
- High Adventure Role Playing, a role-playing game

== Brands and enterprises ==
- Harps Food Stores, a supermarket chain in the central U.S.
- Harp Lager, a brand of beer

== Geography ==
- Harp Lake, a lake in Newfoundland and Labrador, Canada
- Harp Lake, Ontario, a lake

== Science and technology ==
- HARP (Hadron Production Experiment), an experiment at the CERN Proton Synchrotron
- HARP algorithm, a medical image analysis algorithm for processing tagged magnetic resonance images
- Heparin affinity regulatory peptide, the protein Pleiotrophin
- Heterodyne Array Receiver Program, a heterodyne array receiver at the James Clerk Maxwell Telescope
- High Accuracy Radial Velocity Planet Searcher (HARPS), a spectrograph (at La Silla Observatory in Chile) used in astronomy
- High Aspect Ratio Porous Surface (HARPS), an electric thruster system for very small spacecraft
- Hyper-Angular Rainbow Polarimeter #2 (HARP2), a wide-angle imaging polarimeter on the NASA satellite Plankton, Aerosol, Cloud, ocean Ecosystem (PACE)
- Project HARP, a US-Canada ballistics research project famous for its extremely large gun

== Other uses ==
- Harp (surname)
- Home Affordable Refinance Program, a US government program to help homeowners refinance their mortgages
- Lamp harp

== See also ==
- Harpe (disambiguation)
- The Harps (disambiguation)
- Harper (disambiguation)
- Harpsichord
- HAARP (High Frequency Active Auroral Research Program)
- HAARP (album), a 2008 live album and video by English rock band Muse
