= Galt & Bro. =

American luxury jewelry retailer

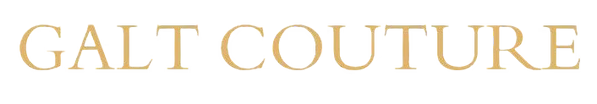

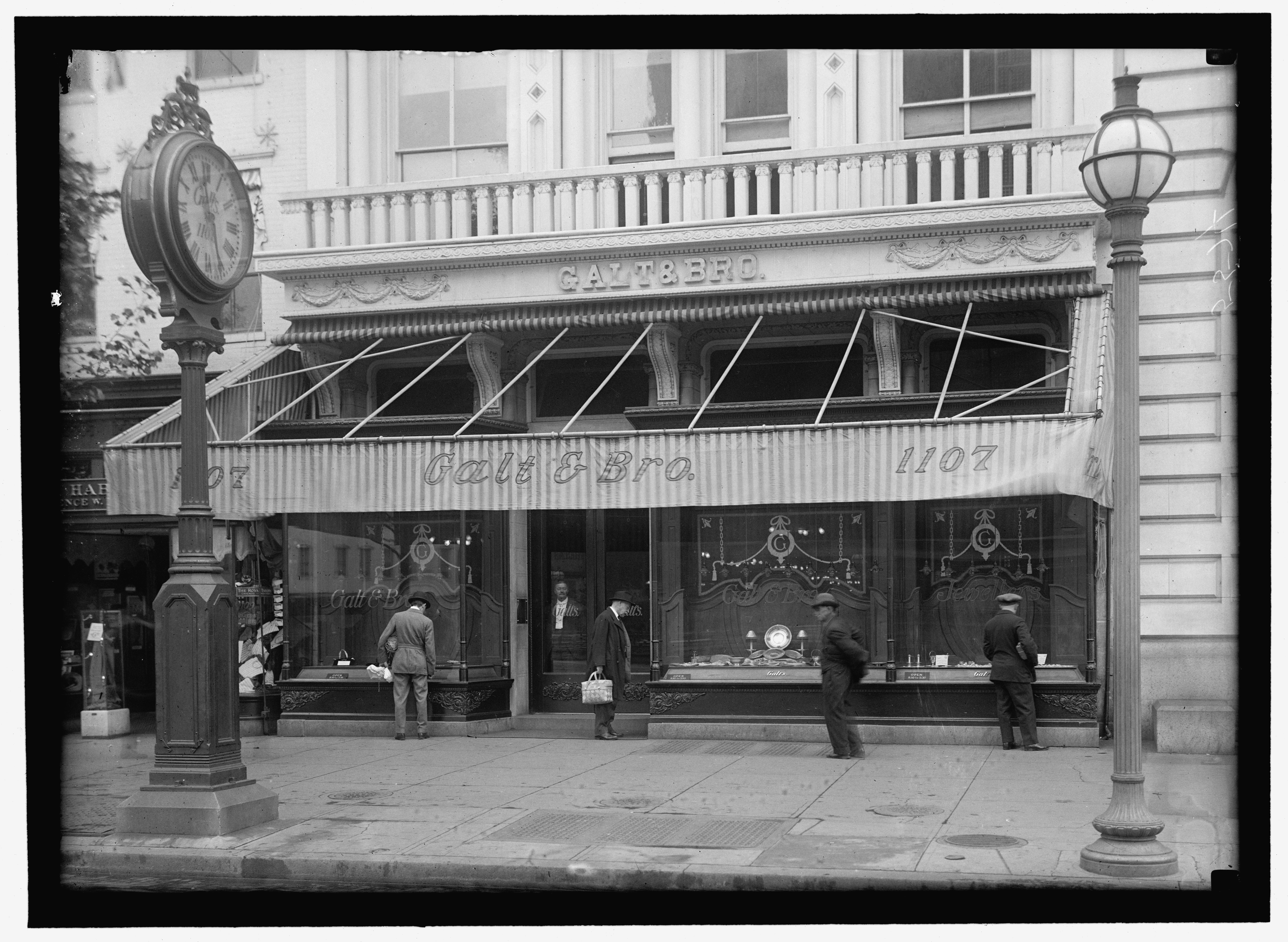
- Industry: Luxury jewelry and watches
- Founded: 1802
- Founder: James Galt
- Headquarters: Washington, D.C., US
- Area served: Worldwide
- Products: Jewelry, watches
- Website: www.galtcouture.com

Galt & Bro. (also known as simply Galt's) is an American luxury jewelry and specialty goods retailer from Washington, District of Columbia. It is known for bespoke jewelry made mostly in 18 karat yellow, white and rose gold, precious and semi-precious gemstones, natural diamonds, sterling silver, watches, and high-end customizable personal accessories. Galt is one of the oldest jewelry companies in America, due to being one of the first officially established businesses in the nation's capital as of 1802.

Galt & Bro. was founded in 1802 by the jeweller James Galt and became famous in the 19th and 20th century by being a popular shopping destination for many prominent figures in American history. The company's ledgers had a list of distinguished patrons including Presidents, First Ladies, diplomats, and renowned visitors from around the world. The imprint of Galt appears on a vast number of valuable items of great historical interest, many of which became museum relics such as Abraham Lincoln's pocket watch. Galt's business philosophy included: “when you cater to Washington, you cater to the world.” Currently, another store operates in Almaty, Kazakhstan.

== History ==
=== Establishment ===
The company was founded in 1802 by a watchmaker and silversmith James Galt in Alexandria, Virginia. At the time Alexandria was one of the first officially incorporated territories of the District of Columbia, and Galt's origin year made the company one of the oldest businesses in the District. Alexandria was the first location for the business until 1825 when it was moved to Washington. D.C.

=== Early years ===
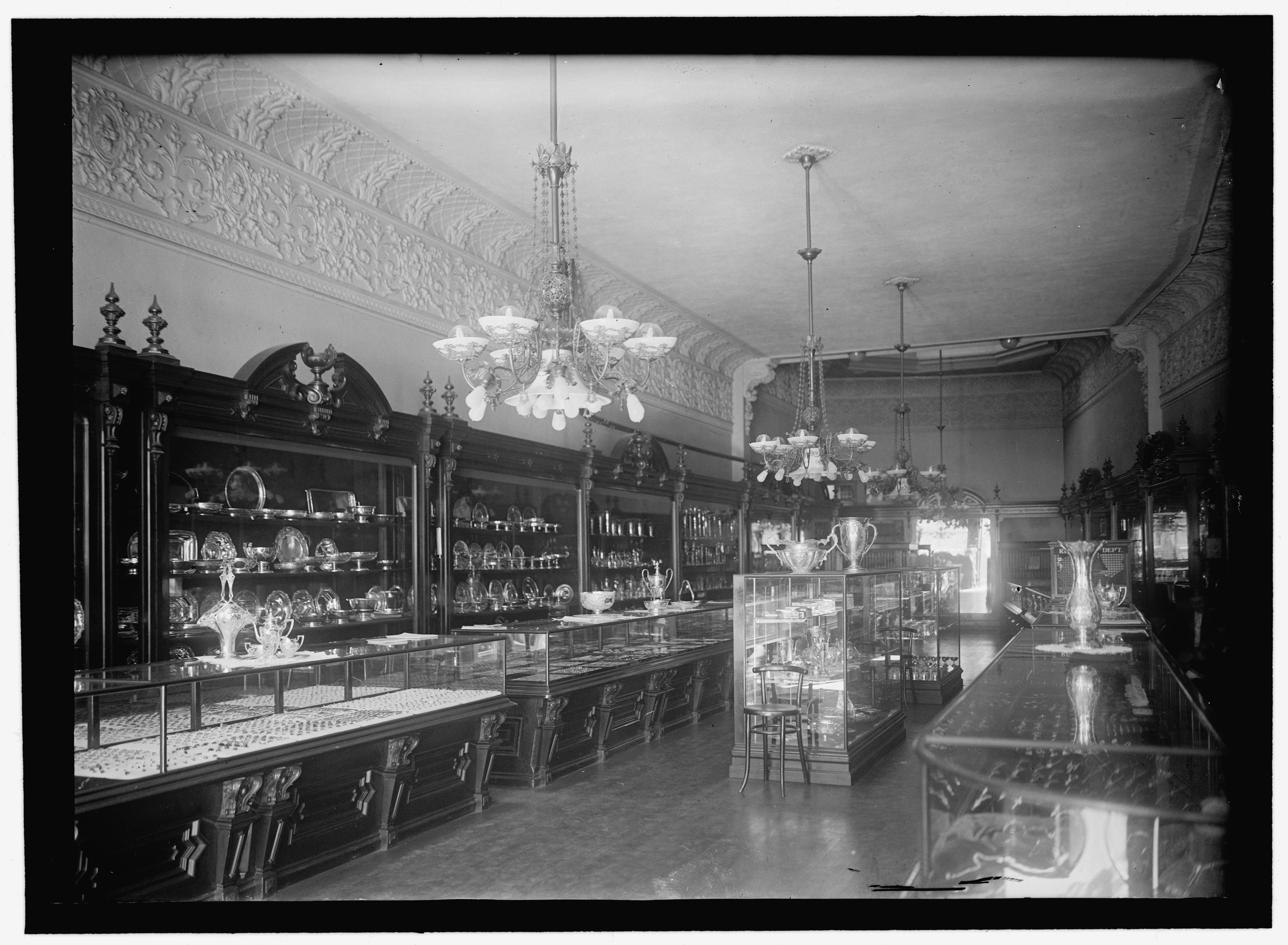
Galt & Bro, 1107 Pennsylvania Avenue, interior showroom, c. 1915

James Galt's patriotism was best exemplified in his voluntary service in the armed forces during the War of 1812, fighting under General Young's brigade during the second British invasion, even participating in the final repulse of British forces from the state of Maryland.

=== Move to Washington, D.C. ===
In 1825, James Galt decided to move his business to downtown Washington, D.C., across the Potomac from Alexandria, with the new location situated on Pennsylvania Avenue & Ninth Street. As America's capital prospered and grew, so did Galt's business and reputation. James Galt continued to oversee the business until his peaceful death in 1847. In 1868, the company moved just a few blocks away from the White House to 1107 Pennsylvania Avenue, where it remained for sixty-six years, making it a permanent, established fixture for the nation's capital. While the company has changed addresses and ownership several times over its more than two hundred years of its existence, it has always remained in the United States’ capital, Washington, D.C.

=== Lincoln's pocket watch and the Civil War ===
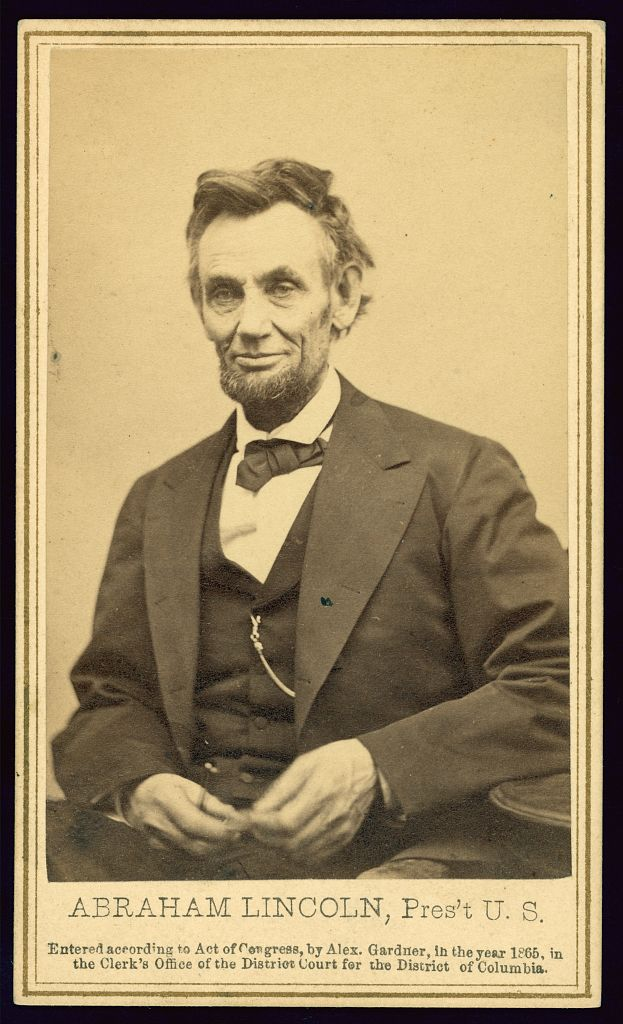
Abraham Lincoln's photograph, in a suit with a pocket watch chain.

The American Civil War began when Confederate troops opened fire on Fort Sumter in Charleston, South Carolina, on April 13, 1861. On that day, while working on President Lincoln's pocket watch, Galt's watchmaker, Jonathan Dillon, heard that another war had begun, and the first shots had been fired. He quickly recited a prayer and secretly inscribed the inside of Lincoln's watch with the following lines: “Jonathan Dillon April 13-1861 Fort Sumpter [sic] was attacked by the rebels on the above date J Dillon" and also "April 13-1861 Washington thank God we have a government Jonth Dillon” This watch never left Lincoln's jacket pocket throughout his lifetime.

The secret engraving and its contents were never revealed and for 148 years the public doubted its existence. Even Lincoln himself never realized that he carried this hopeful inscription in his pocket every day during the Civil War. After forty-five years passed, Dillon told The New York Times about an engraving he made when repairing Lincoln's watch during the opening act of the Civil War.

However, it was not until 2001 when Doug Stiles, Dillon's great-great-grandson, contacted The Smithsonian National Museum of American History, which came into possession of the watch, and requested the watch to be opened and for the engraving to be revealed to the public. After almost one hundred fifty years, Lincoln's favorite watch and Dillon's prayer were both fully etched into the annals of American history.

Lincoln's favorite pocket watch was not the only connection his family had with Galt & Bro. During those years, the First Lady Mary Todd Lincoln was known for her growing obsession with spending during the Civil War. From 1861 to 1865, Galt's ledger recorded a long list of Mary Todd Lincoln's purchases, which included diamond rings, gold bracelets, brooches, fans, cuff & shawl pins, bouquet holders, teaspoons and enamelled accessories. In her famous Civil War photograph taken by Mathew Brady, Todd Lincoln is wearing Galt's diamond-and-pearl necklace and bracelet set, which she purchased for a total price of $1,100.

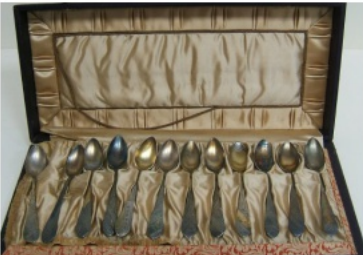
A silver set presented to President Rutherford B. Hayes and his wife First Lady Lucy Hayes on the occasion of their wedding anniversary on December 30, 1877

=== President Rutherford B. Hayes ===
The 19th president of the United States, President Rutherford B. Hayes, and his wife First Lady Lucy Hayes were presented with a Galt silver set on the occasion of their wedding anniversary on 30 December 1877. The wood box was covered with leather with the gold script lettering on top: "The President and Mrs. Hayes December 30, 1852-1877". The front edge featured Galt's hallmark. The case holds twelve sterling silver spoons, with each spoon designed differently.

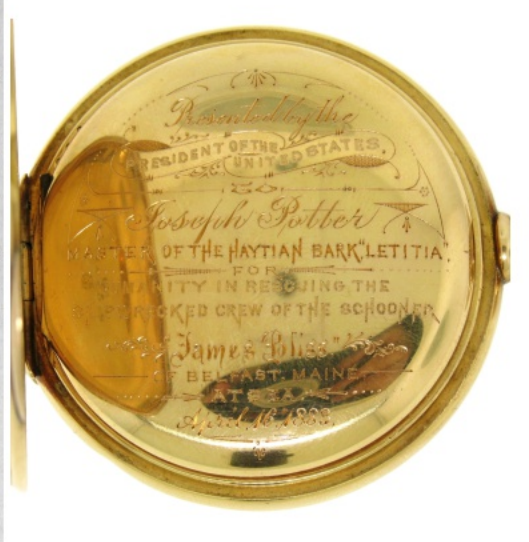
An 18 karat gold pocket watch presented to Joseph Haydn Potter by the President of the United States Chester A. Arthur.

=== President Chester A. Arthur ===
The 21st president of the United States, Chester A. Arthur, had commissioned a pocket watch. The 18 karat gold Waltham Hunter pocket watch was presented to Joseph Haydn Potter in the 1883 for his services during his time as a general in the Union Army during the American Civil War. The engraving on the pocket watch read: "Presented by the President of the United States to Joseph Potter Master of the Haytian Bark "Letitia" for Humanity in rescuing the Shipwrecked Crew of the Schooner James Bliss of Belfast Maine At Sea April 16, 1883".

=== President William Howard Taft ===
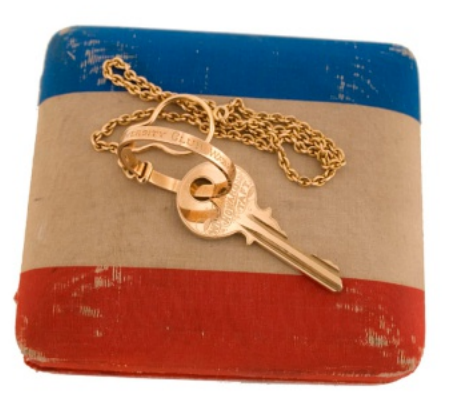
President William Howard Taft's gold Yale keychain in 14 karat gold with a ring and matching chain, with an engraving of his name on one side and Yale/1912 on the reverse side.

The 27th president of the United States, William Howard Taft, was presented with a gold Yale keychain in the year 1913 on the occasion of joining the faculty at the Yale Law School after having left the White House in the year prior. Taft taught at Yale from 1913 to 1921 until he was appointed Chief Justice of the United States Supreme Court by President Warren G. Harding. The keychain was made in 14 karat gold with a ring and matching chain, with an engraving of his name on one side and Yale/1912 on the reverse side. The ring contained a text engraving that reads University Club Washington DC, 1913 and the gift box contained the mark of Galt & Bro.

=== First Lady in Charge: Edith Galt ===
After the death of James Galt, his son Matthew Galt remained the sole owner of the business until 1892. After his death, Matthew Galt's sons, Walter A. Galt and Norman Galt, inherited the company and renamed it Galt & Bro. While Walter Galt withdrew from his ownership in 1900, Norman Galt continued to lead the business until 1908. In his early life, Norman Galt married the future First Lady of the United States, Miss Edith Bolling, who herself inherited the business in 1908, after her husband's death.

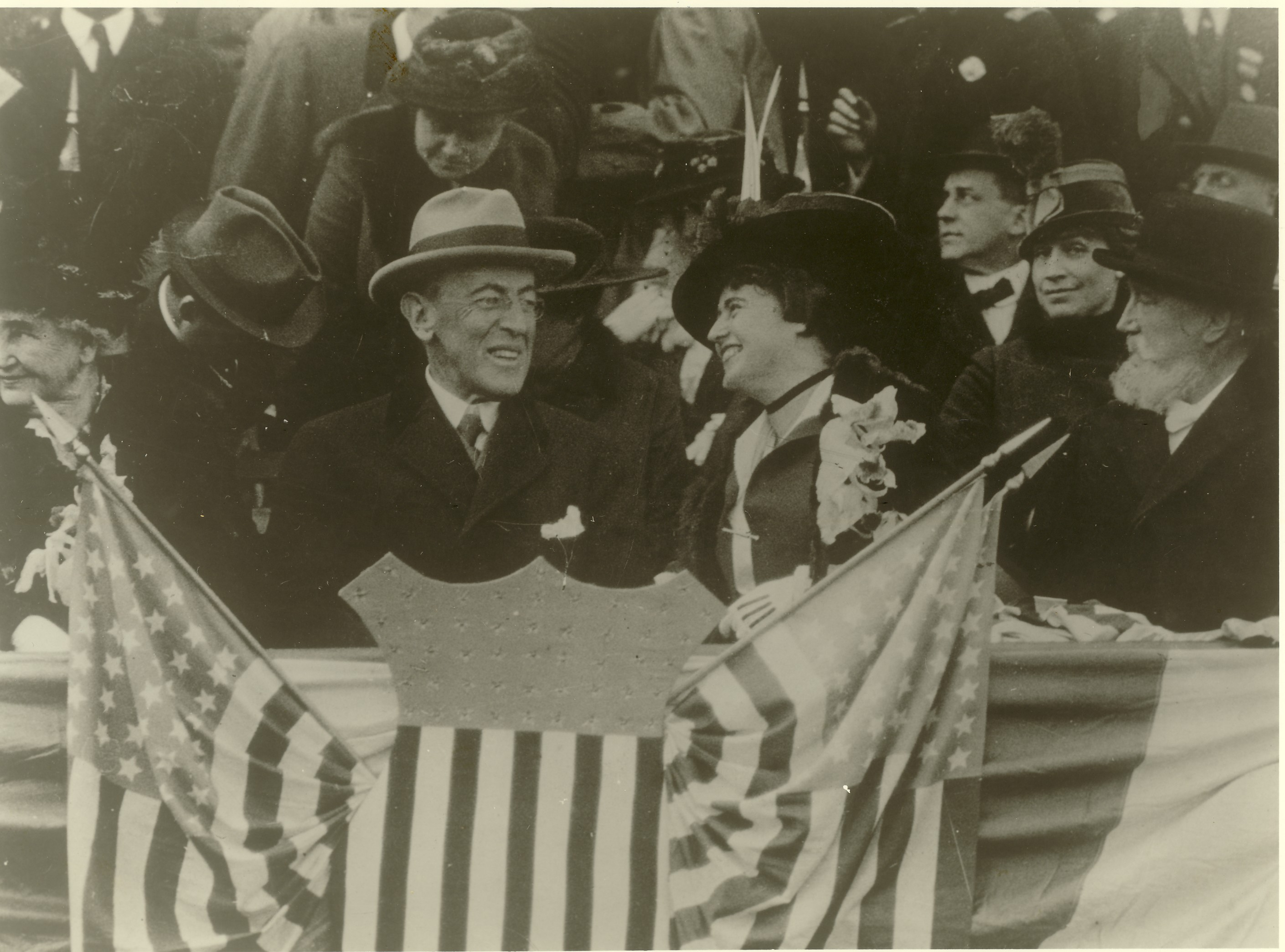
Woodrow Wilson and Edith Galt Wilson at a Ball Game

Edith Galt later married the 28th American president, Woodrow Wilson, and became the official First Lady of the United States, juggling her role of serving the nation while continuing to manage the Galt business until 1934. Edith became one of the most notable and controversial American First Ladies. Edith Galt is most known for her administrative involvement after the President's stroke while still in office. Some historians give her more credit and call her the first female President of the United States, as she and Wilson were very close, working side by side on many occasions.

In 1916, First Lady Edith Bolling Wilson presented a Galt & Bro. pendant to an Australian composer Percy Grainger. While Grainger lived in D.C., he performed for three American presidents: Woodrow Wilson, Calvin Coolidge, and Franklin D. Roosevelt. Grainger was gifted with this pendant in recognition of his first performance at the White House for the Wilson family in March 1916. This piece is now a part of the Grainger Museum Collection.

=== 1930s-1999 ===
As Galt changed its ownership throughout the two centuries, new owners and leadership added more energy, work, and improvement into the company. Each decade new milestones were achieved with the addition of new jewelry designs and collections, attracting new clients. Galt's contributions were hence carried through each American era. In 1941, during the onset of World War II, Galt held a gold and silver donation drive to support the war efforts and help finance the U.S. and its allies. The public was asked to bring any old gold and silver pieces to the store. The money from the contributions went to the soldiers, sailors, and the Marines Club that maintained quarters for visiting soldiers.

=== President Dwight D. Eisenhower ===
In the year 1960, the 34th president of the United States, President Dwight D. Eisenhower, had commissioned a gold plaque made in 14 karat gold for the Soviet leader Nikita Khrushchev. However their meeting was ultimately cancelled as a result of the emerging Cold War and increasing tensions between the United States and the Soviet Union. The plaque remained unaccounted for and instead Galt & Bro. kept the gold plaque to become another artefact of American history, as a memento of the polarizing relationship between the United States and the Soviet Union, eventually succeeded by Russia.

=== President John F. Kennedy ===
The 35th president of the United States, John F. Kennedy, made use of sterling silver items crafted by Galt & Bro. in the White House. These include a White House Oval Office paperweight engraved with the President's Seal. Apart from personal use, he gave similar paperweights as special gifts to friends during his presidency. Another article made in sterling silver were engraved napkin holders used when members of the President's Administration dined at the White House. The President had also commissioned a gold plaque as a token of goodwill for the last ruling Sultan of Zanzibar, Sayyid Jamshid bin Abdullah Al Said. The plaque was never received as a consequence of the President's assassination in 1963.

=== 2000-present ===
A 10-carat pink diamond ring crafted by Galt & Bro. was sold at auction by Christie's for $2.21 million on October 10, 2012. The ring was set with a pear-shaped fancy light pink diamond, weighing approximately 10.52 carats, flanked on either side by a tapered baguette-cut diamond, and mounted in platinum. A report from the Gemological Institute of America stated that the diamond is a fancy light pink, natural color, SI clarity. It was also accompanied by a supplemental letter from the GIA stating that the diamond is a Type IIa diamond, a type known to be as most chemically pure and known to have exceptional transparency. The diamond was originally purchased in the same 1968 auction in which Richard Burton purchased a 33.19 carat diamond ring for Elizabeth Taylor, which later became known as The Elizabeth Taylor Diamond and was sold at Christie's New York in December 2011 for $8.82 million.

==== Rebranding to Galt Couture ====
In recent years, the company was rebranded as Galt Couture, continuing operations in the luxury jewelry market.

== Notable patrons and clientele ==
Galt & Bro. served a number of prominent figures in American history. The firm's ledgers document patrons and visitors associated with the business. Since its founding in the early nineteenth century, every President of the United States, including Thomas Jefferson, Abraham Lincoln, and Theodore Roosevelt, has been a client.

Norman Galt described his business philosophy as: "when you cater to Washington, you cater to the world."

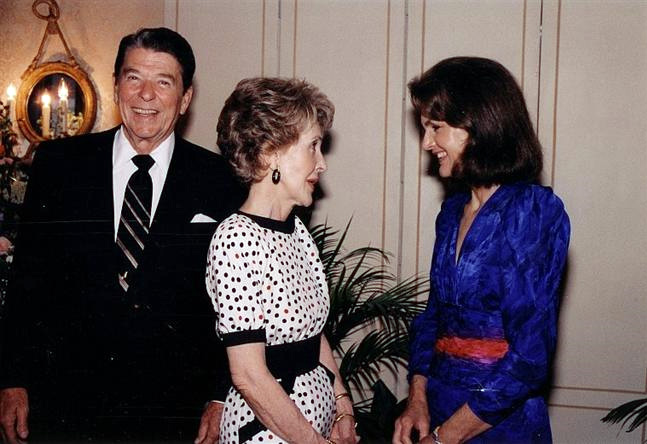
Galt's clients included Jackie Onassis Kennedy and the Reagan family

=== Heads of state ===
- 1861 – President Abraham Lincoln brings his pocket watch into Galt & Bro to be serviced.
- 1883 – President Chester A. Arthur presented an 18-karat yellow-gold pocket watch to Joseph Haydn Potter in recognition of his service as a Union Army general during the American Civil War.
- 1913 – President William Howard Taft received a gold Yale key chain made by Galt, engraved "Yale/1912" with "William Howard Taft" on the reverse. It was given to Taft when he joined the faculty at Yale Law School after leaving the White House in 1912. Taft taught at Yale from 1913 to 1921 before being appointed Chief Justice of the United States.
- 1960 – President Dwight D. Eisenhower ordered a 14-karat gold plaque intended for Soviet leader Nikita Khrushchev. The planned meeting between the two leaders was later canceled amid tensions between the United States and the Soviet Union. Galt did not charge the White House and kept the gold plaque as another artifact of American history.

=== Royalty ===
- 1900 – Sultan Abdul Hamid II of the Ottoman Empire received a pair of 18-karat gold marine binoculars produced by Galt & Bro. These binoculars contained 700 white diamonds and featured the Ottoman Empire's coat of arms.
- 1963 – President John F. Kennedy commissioned a plaque for the Sultan of Zanzibar, Sayyid Jamshid bin Abdullah Al Said, which was never picked up following Kennedy's assassination in 1963.

=== First ladies ===
- 1861 – Mary Todd Lincoln purchased jewelry and accessories including diamond rings, gold bracelets, brooches, fans, cuff and shawl pins, bouquet holders, teaspoons, enameled accessories, and a diamond-and-pearl necklace and bracelet set.
- 1869 – Julia Dent Grant was a personal customer.
- 1877 – Lucy Hayes and President Rutherford B. Hayes received a set of twelve sterling-silver spoons decorated by Galt & Bro. in connection with a White House celebration of their wedding anniversary.
- 1886 – Frances Folsom Cleveland was recorded as a customer.
- 1916 – Edith Wilson presented a Galt & Bro. pendant to the Australian composer Percy Grainger following a performance at the White House.
- 1961 – Eleanor Roosevelt purchased a pair of Art Deco platinum and diamond cluster earrings from Galt & Bro., with a total diamond weight of approximately six carats.

== In popular culture ==
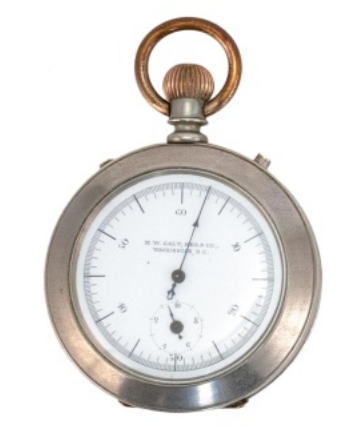
A Vintage US Lighthouse Establishment Stopwatch from the late 19th/ Early 20th century. It has a white porcelain dial marked "M.W. Galt Bro & Co., Washington, D.C.".

=== USLHE district inspector's stopwatch ===
Between 1867 and 1875, a total of 25 stopwatches were produced by Matthew Galt and William Galt for the US Light-House Establishment. These stopwatches were supplied to each of the supervisors of the twelve Light-House Districts to keep track of the timing of rotation of the lighthouse lenses. These stopwatches were critical tools for mariners to safely reach their destination. Today only a few of these stopwatches remain and are displayed at various museums across the United States.

=== Souvenir spoons ===
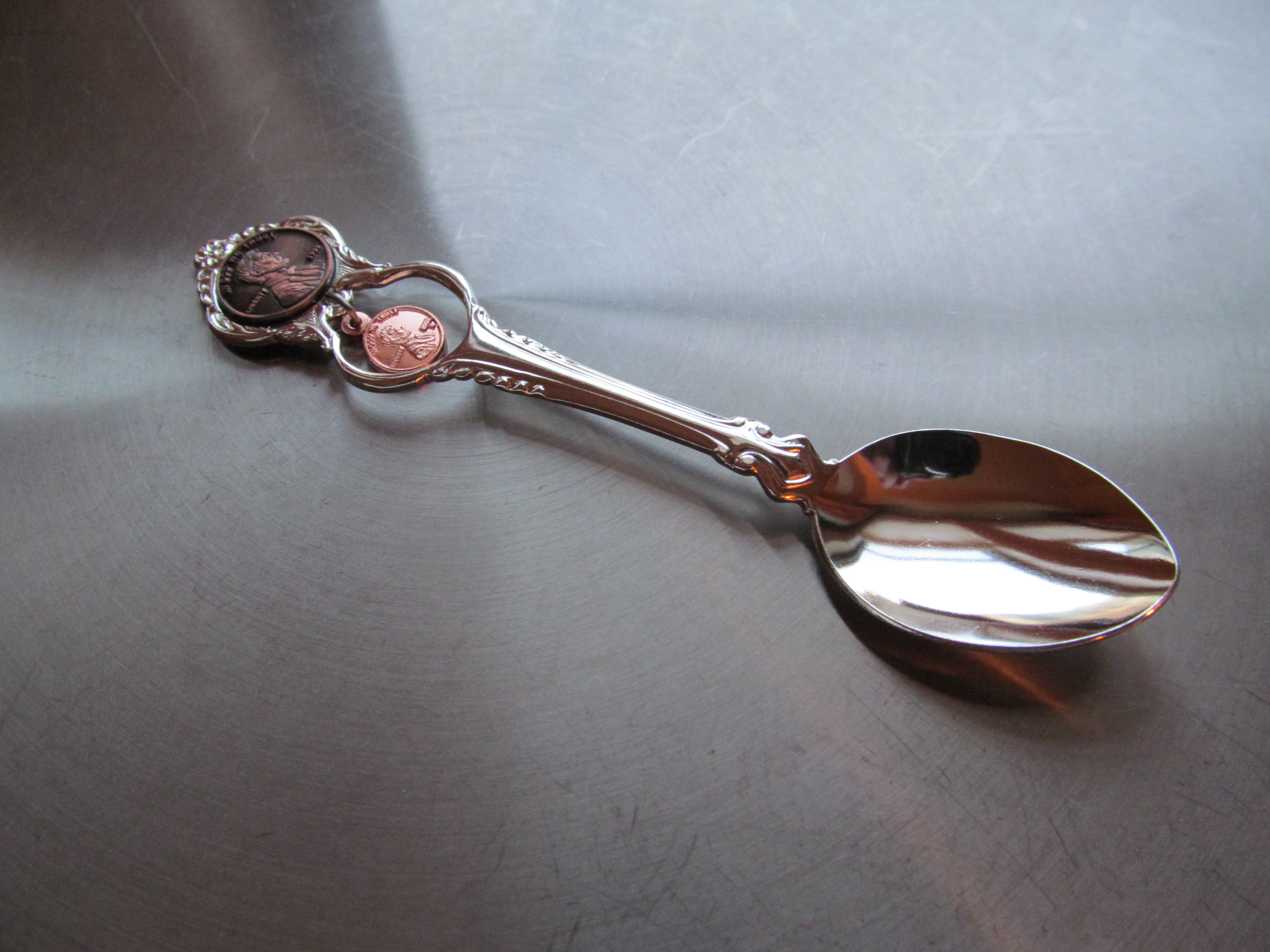
Souvenir spoon from Ford's Theatre, Washington DC

Souvenir spoons were first popularized in Europe in the mid-1850s. M.W. Galt and Seth F. Low are credited with introducing this concept to the United States. Thereby, Galt & Bro. made the first souvenir spoon in 1889, the George Washington spoon. The design was inspired in honor of the first President's 100th anniversary. It was followed shortly by the Martha Washington spoon. The spoon designs were trademarked by Galt & Bro. in 1890. This led to souvenir spoon popularity, in which hundreds of souvenir spoon patterns were being produced across America, with designs commemorating things such as U.S. cities, prominent people, current and historical events, schools, animals, and flowers.

=== The Washington Post March ===
In June 1889, around 25,000 spectators gathered on the Smithsonian grounds for the Washington Post Amateur Authors' Association Grand Ceremony. The competition was held for young, promising writers. During the premier of the march, Supreme Court Justice Miller presented gold and handcrafted medals from Galt & Bro. to the winners of the young essay contest. The medals were awarded to eleven student winners, one from each grade level from public schools in Washington, D.C., each one designed and engraved differently by M.W. Galt & Bro. Since then, Galt & Bro. was often involved in object making for celebrations at the district which were not only given out as prizes, but also made to commemorate these events.

=== Golf trophies ===
The Galt store had also retailed two sterling silver golf trophies marked by George W. Shiebler and Company, New York. The 19th century sterling silver Golf Trophy by Gorham was also retailed by Galt. This particular trophy was a pitcher-shaped trophy with a beaded waist and beaded a presentation engraving to J.W. Lockett for the 1897 Washington Golf Club Open Tournament.

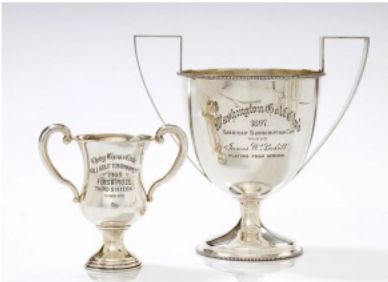
Two Sterling Silver Golf Trophies, the first marked by George W. Shiebler and Company, New York and retailed by Galt and Bro, Washington DC.

=== Notable contemporary wearers ===
In the 21st century, Galt & Bro pieces have been worn by celebrities and influencers.

In 2021, rapper A$AP Rocky wore a pearl necklace by Galt & Bro to the premiere of his documentary Stockholm Syndrome at the Tribeca Film Festival in New York City. That same year, musician Giveon wore a bracelet by the brand during his first performance at the Lollapalooza, as part of a contemporary outfit. The company also creates custom pieces for celebrities such as Rihanna.

== Gallery ==
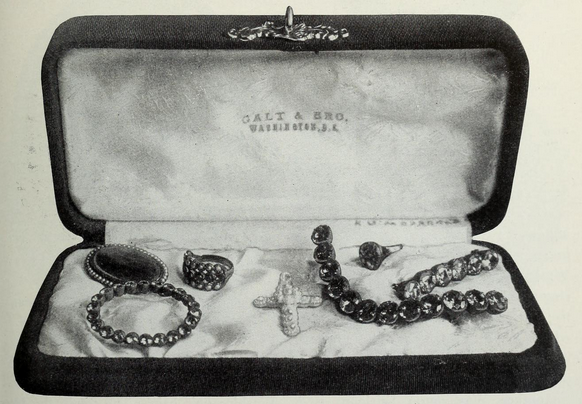
Brooch and knee-buckle belonging to George Washington; Martha Washington's pearl and amethyst ring and cross made from pearls

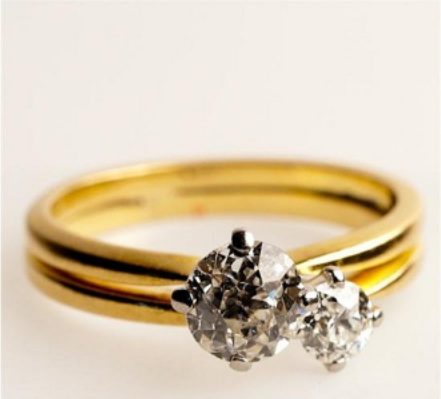
An engagement ring made in 18 karat yellow gold and platinum, set with two round old European-cut diamonds of 1.0cts and 0.30cts, marked Galt

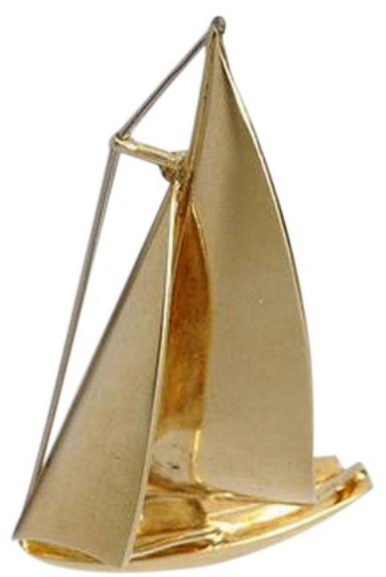
Gold Sailboat Brooch by Galt & Bro.

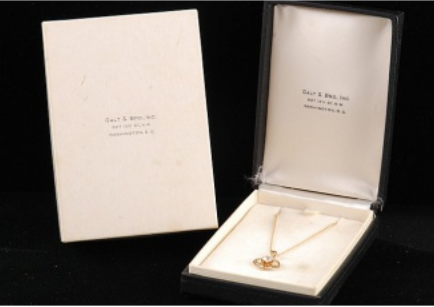
Old-Mine cut Diamond pendant with a 16-inch chain, with the diamond set in a wheel form pendant setting.

== See also ==
- Edith Wilson
- Waltham Model 1857
- Souvenir Spoons
- The Washington Post March
