= La Harpe =

La Harpe may refer to:

- La Harpe (surname)
- La Harpe, Illinois
- La Harpe, Kansas

== See also ==
- Harpe (disambiguation)
