= The Harps =

The Harps may refer to:

- Finn Harps F.C., League of Ireland football (soccer) club
- The Harps GAA, hurling, football (Gaelic) and camogie club in County Laois, Ireland
- Skerries Harps GAA, hurling, football (Gaelic) and camogie club in County Dublin, Ireland
- Armagh Harps GFC, football (Gaelic) club in County Armagh, Ireland
- Stewartstown Harps GFC, football (Gaelic) club in County Tyrone
- Derrygonnelly Harps GFC, football (Gaelic) club in County Fermanagh
- High Accuracy Radial Velocity Planet Searcher, a spectrograph known as the HARPS
- HARPS-N, a spectrograph

== See also ==
- The Harp, a public house at Covent Garden, London
- Harp (disambiguation)
