= Lamp harp =

Part of a lamp which holds the shade

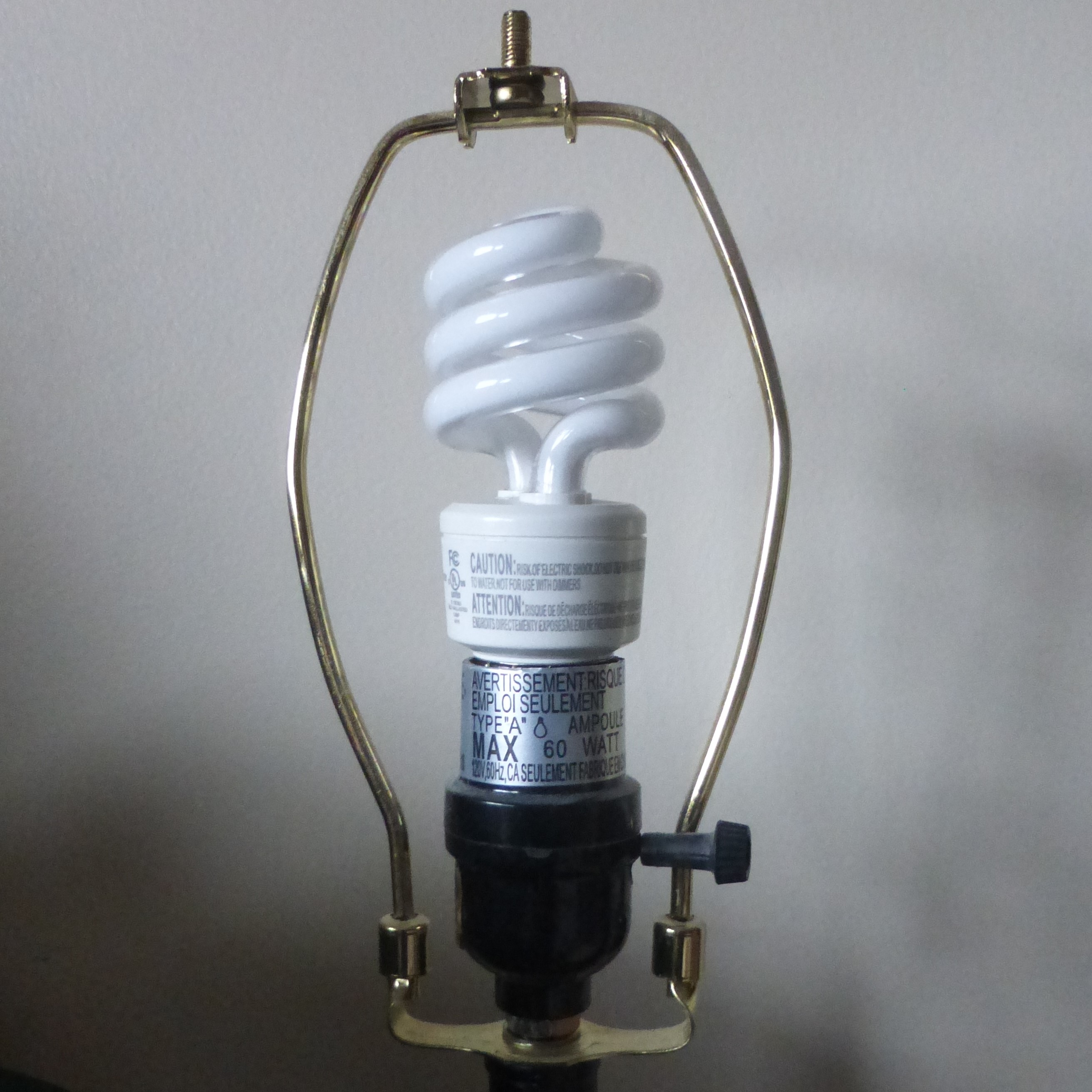
Lamp harp with fluorescent bulb

A lamp harp is the component of a lamp to which the lamp shade is attached. It typically comes in two separate parts, a saddle which is fastened under the lamp socket, and the harp itself which consist of a lightweight frame attached to the saddle at its lower end and extending upwards to a point above the bulb. At the top of the harp is a threaded rod. The shade's internal frame (known as a spider) mounts on this rod and is secured in place by a lamp finial. Common materials for harps include brass and nickel. The most common thread size is 1/4-27.
