= Souvenir spoon =

Kind of spoon

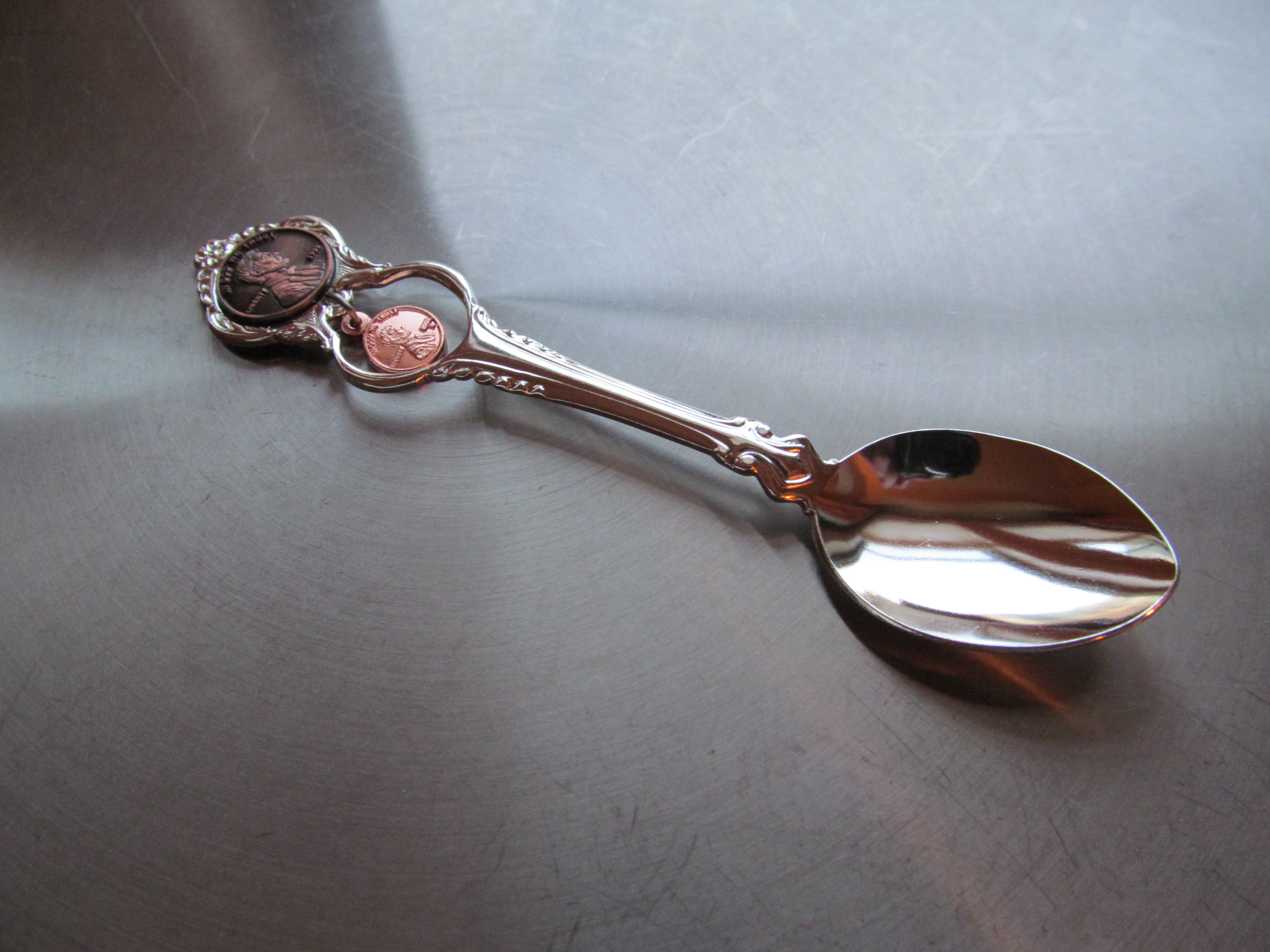
Souvenir Spoon from Ford's Theatre, Washington, D.C., USA

A souvenir spoon is a decorative spoon used as a memento of a place or to display as a 'trophy' of having been there. The spoons may be made from a number of different materials such as sterling silver, nickel, steel, and in some cases wood. They are often hung on a spoon rack and are typically ornamental, depicting sights, coat of arms, associated characters, etc. The year the spoon was made may be inscribed in the bowl, or on the back. The entire spoon, including the bowl, handle, and finial may be used to convey the theme.

The first souvenir spoons in the United States were made in 1890 by Galt & Bros., Inc. of Washington D.C., featuring the profile of George Washington. Although the George Washington spoon was one of the most popular designs, relatively few made by Galt & Bro. remain in circulation. One year later, a souvenir Salem Witch spoon was made, and sold seven thousand copies. It was created by Daniel Low, a jeweler in Salem, Massachusetts, after he saw souvenir spoons on vacation in Germany. The Witch Spoon is given credit for starting the souvenir spoon hobby in the U.S.
