= Lampshade =

Decorative or functional shade placed over the light source of a lamp

Two modern artistic electric lamps with lampshades, one minimalistic and the other of art deco design

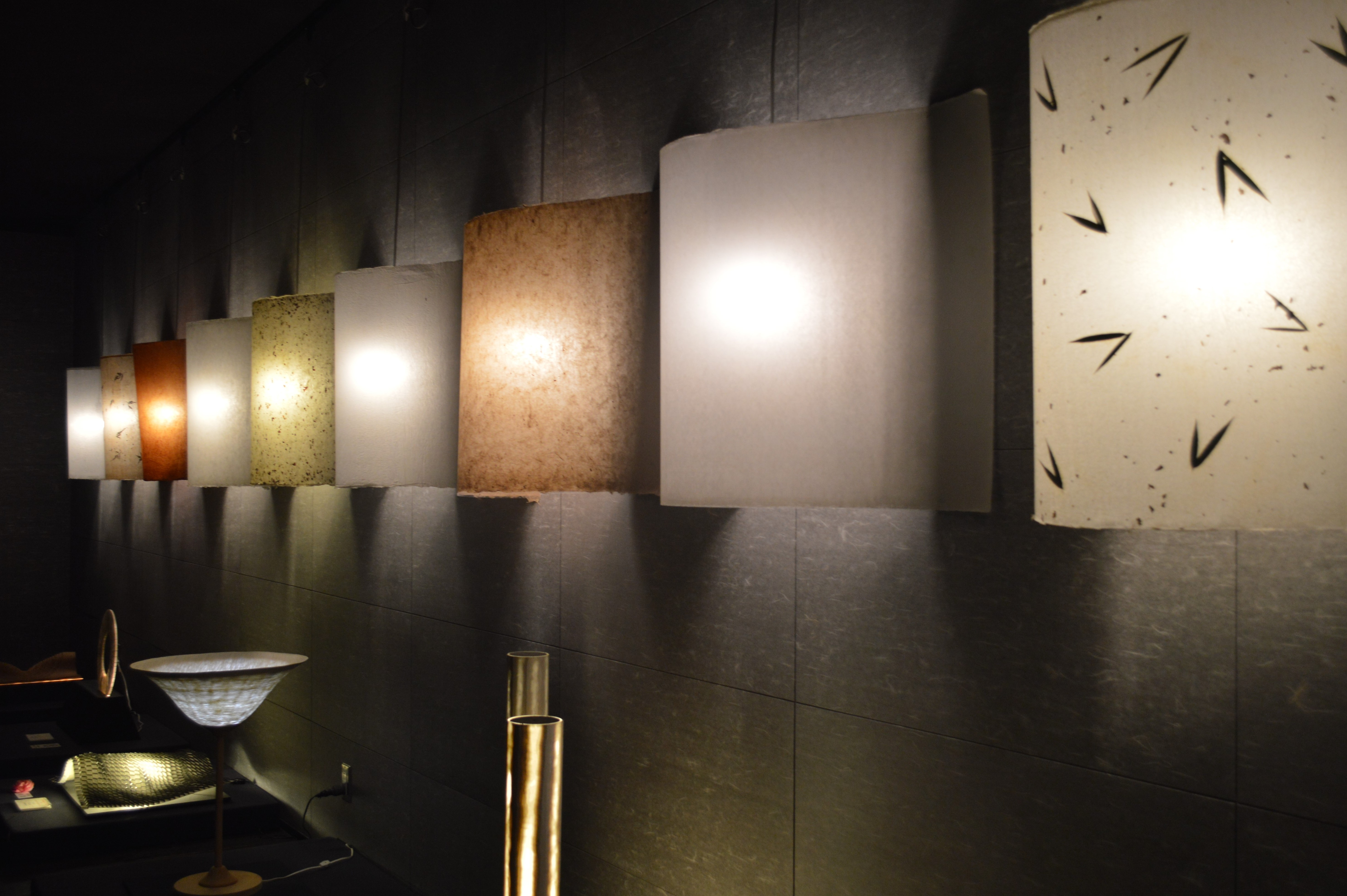
Mulberry paper (Mino washi) lampshades in an art museum in Japan

A lampshade is a fixture that envelops the light bulb to redirect the light it emits. The shade is often affixed onto a light fixture to reduce the intensity of the light, shield the bulb from a harsh environment, or for décor by altering the color.

Lampshades can be made out of a large variety of translucent materials such as paper, glass, fabric, and even stone. Often conical or cylindrical in shape, lampshades can be found on floor, desk, tabletop, or suspended lamps. The term can also apply to the glass or other materials hung around many designs of ceiling lamp. Some lamp shades are also lined with a hard-backed opaque lining, often white or gold, to reflect as much light as possible through the top and bottom of the shade while blocking light from emitting through the walls of the shade itself. In other cases, the shade material is deliberately decorative so that upon illumination it may emphasize a display of color and light emitting through the shade itself.

== History ==
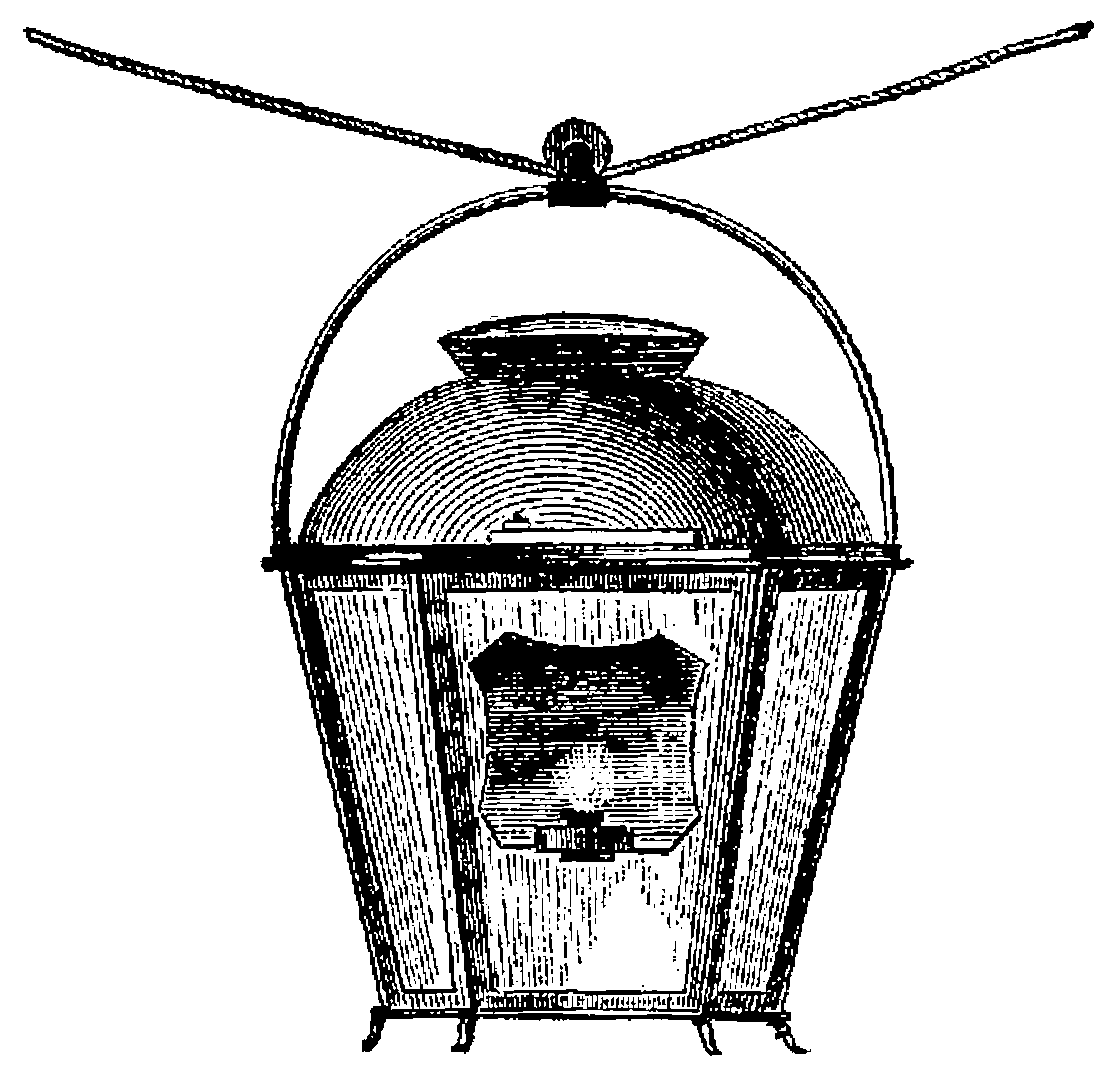
18th century réverbère

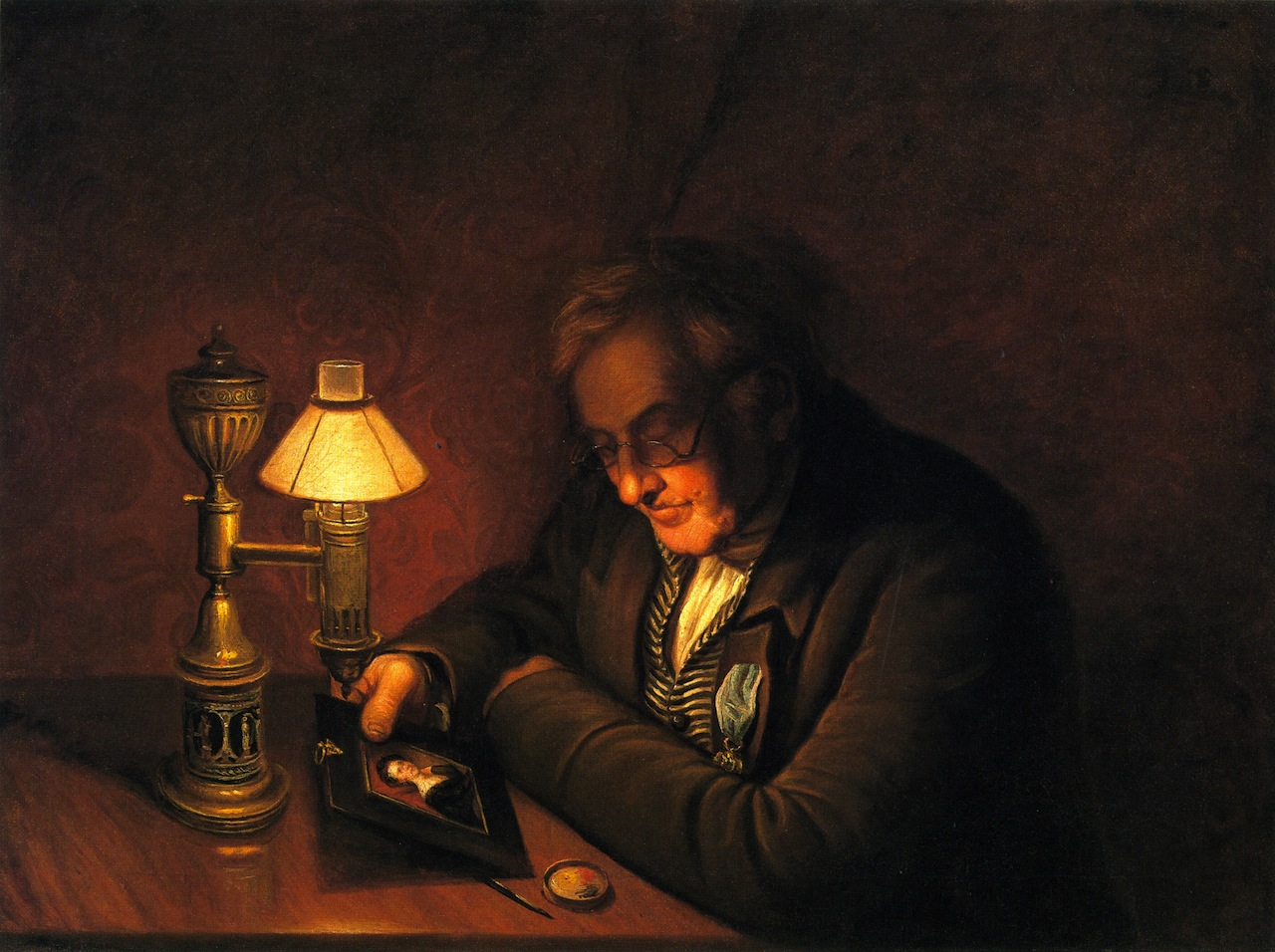
An Argand oil lamp in use with a glass shade, 1822

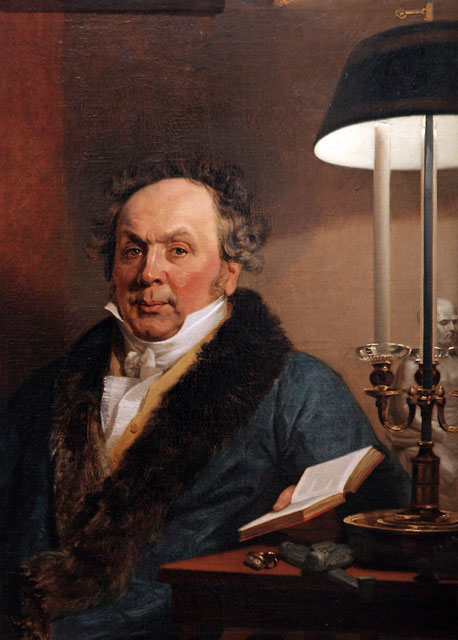
Adjustable tole (painted tin) candleshade in a Russian portrait, c. 1830s

In 1763, the réverbères, oil lamps with reflectors, began to be hung in Paris above the center of streets for illumination at night. The first public oil lamps in Milan dating from 1785 had a semi-spherical reflector above the flame that projected the light downwards, while another reflector, slightly concave and near the flame, directed the light laterally.

In 1879, Joseph Swan and Thomas Edison independently developed the incandescent filament electric light bulb by building on research by Humphry Davy, De Moleyn and Heinrich Göbel. With the brighter lights, designers in the early 20th century focused on reducing the glare from electric lamps using lampshades.

To disguise the intense electric light, lampshades were used. Some were made by Tiffany in colored glass. The great advantage of the electric light bulb was the absence of flame and traces of combustion, thus avoiding all risks of intoxication, explosion or fire. In the beginning, the filament was made of carbonised vegetable fibres, then bamboo fibres and finally metal alloys until, in the early 20th century, the tungsten filament invented in 1904 became the industry standard.

== Lampshade types ==
Modern lampshades can be classified by shape, by material, by fitter, or by function.

=== Shades by shape ===
Lampshades are classified in four basic shapes: drum, empire, bell or coolie depending on their shape. A drum or cylinder shade typically features vertical sides, sometimes with a very slight incline where the top of the shade is slightly smaller than the bottom. A slightly greater incline produces a "floor" shade which is not far from the "true" drum profile. As the slope of the side of the shade increases, the design moves through the classic empire shade (or variation with straight or bell-curved sides) on towards the more pyramidal-style shape of a coolie shade.

Beyond the basics, lampshade shapes also include square, cut-corner, hexagon, gallery, oval, or scalloped shapes. Square, rectangular and oval shades appear to have these shapes when viewed from above or below. This also includes hexagonal shades and cut-corner shades which appear like square or round shades with the "corners cut off" or indented. A shade with a gallery can be of any shape but has a distinct strip around the bottom of the shade.

Some of the lampshades are as follows:

- Rustic: simple elements like linen, cork, and cotton in muted earth tones complement rustic farmhouse or cottage interiors
- Traditional: often linen, paper shades, and silk shades inside pleated and box pleated shapes
- Modern: innovative shapes like drum, square, and cylinder
- Antique & Vintage Inspired: simulations of antique lamp shades mimic those of past eras, often using textures such as glass, fringe, and beads that are not generally found in current designs

antique reproduction lamp shades mimic those of past eras, often using textures such as glass, fringe, and beads that are not generally found in current designs

=== Lampshades by material ===
Lampshades are made of fabric, parchment, glass, Tiffany glass, paper or plastic. Common fabric materials include silk, linen and cotton. Fabric shades are reinforced by metal frames to give the lampshades their shape, while paper or plastic shades can hold their shape without support. For this reason, paper shades can be more fragile than fabric shades. Darker shades sometimes add a reflective liner such as gold or silver in order to maximize light output.

=== Lampshade fitters ===
A "fitter" describes how the lampshade connects to the lamp base. The most common lampshade fitter is a Spider fitter. Spider fitters are set on top of a lamp harp, and secured with a finial. The harp is typically seated below the socket and two arms rise up around the light bulb and join at the top, where it provides resting support for the spider fitter itself. The fitter is built into the lamp shade frame itself and sits on top of the harp. Other fitters include clip-on (for either regular bulbs or candelabra bulbs), Uno fitters which are attached to the lamp itself below the light bulb, and notched-bowl fitters which support the use of a glass reflector bowl.

=== Consideration of light bulb heat ===
A lamp shade's surfaces have varying proximity to the light bulb or light source itself, depending on the size and shape of the shade. With larger shades this is less of a problem, since the shade provides an ample funnel for the movement of air up through the shade, whereby heat from the bulb leaves the top of the shade through the opening. However, with smaller shades consideration has to be given to proximity of the shade surface to the bulb, especially in miniature shades used on chandeliers. Here, and especially with shades which have sloped sides, the distance between the surface and the bulb reduces making the risk of overheating a concern. The heat generated by incandescent light bulbs can scorch fabric lampshades and even crack glass shades. All of these problems are precluded by using LED lamps, which use much less energy, last much longer, and emit very little heat.
