= Harpe (disambiguation) =

The Harpe was a mythical sword in Greek and Roman mythology.

Harpe may also refer to:

People:

- Josef Harpe (1887 – 1968), German military general
- Winfield S. Harpe ( 1937 – 1988), American Air Force officer
- The Harpe brothers (Micajah and Wiley Harpe), American mass murderers

In biology:

- Harpe, a junior synonym of the fish genus Bodianus
- Harpe, a reproductive structure in insects that is part of the valva

Other

- Harpe (mythology), a character in Greek mythology

== See also ==
- Harp (disambiguation)
- La Harpe (disambiguation)
