= Hadron Production Experiment =

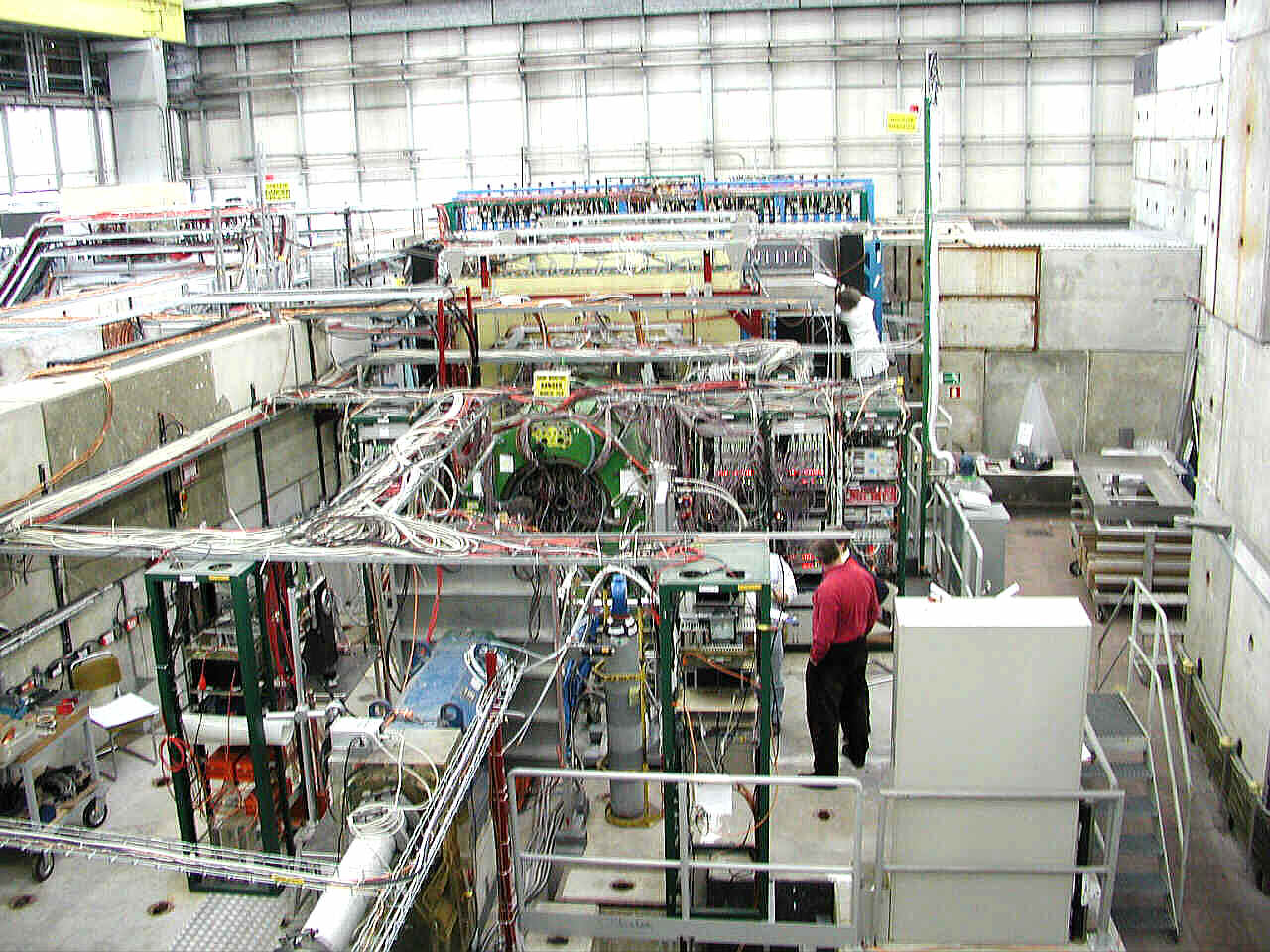
CERN PS214 experiment

HARP, the Hadron Production Experiment, also referred to as the PS214 experiment, at the Proton Synchrotron was a physics experiment at CERN that took data from 2000 through 2002. Its goal was to systematically study hadron production on a wide variety of nuclear targets. The data is used to help predict neutrino fluxes at experiments such as MiniBooNE and K2K, to understand the atmospheric neutrino flux, and to tune Monte Carlo simulations of particle production.

== Experimental design ==
Protons of 1.5 to 15 GeV were directed at targets ranging from hydrogen to lead. Using about 300 different beam/target configurations, 420 million events were recorded.

== Analysis and results ==
Analysis of HARP data has been carried out by two independent groups, the second group calling itself HARP-CDP for "HARP-CERN-Dubna-Protvino". This group split from the main collaboration over "a deep split of opinion over quality of work, working methods, and professional ethics"
