= La Harpe (surname) =

La Harpe is a surname. Notable people with the surname include:

- Amédée Emmanuel François Laharpe (1754–1796), French general and cousin of Frédéric-César
- Darryl de la Harpe (born 1986), Namibian rugby union player
- Deborah-Anne De la Harpe (born 2000), Australian footballer
- Frédéric-César de La Harpe (1754–1838), Swiss politician and tutor to the Tsar of Russia
- Jean-Baptiste Bénard de la Harpe (1683–1765), French explorer
- Jean-François de La Harpe (1739–1803), French playwright, writer and critic
- Philippe de La Harpe (1830–1882), Swiss paleontologist
- Ryan de la Harpe (born 1982), Namibian rugby union player
