= Harp (surname) =

Harp is a surname. Notable people with the surname include:

- Clarine Harp (born 1978), American voice actress
- Everette Harp (born 1961), American saxophonist
- Jessica Harp (born 1982), American musician
- Natalie Harp (born 1991), American political aide
- Susana Harp (born 1968), Mexican singer
- Tom Harp (born c. 1927), American football player and coach
- Toni Harp (born 1949), American politician
