= Harp Lake =

Lake in Labrador, Canada

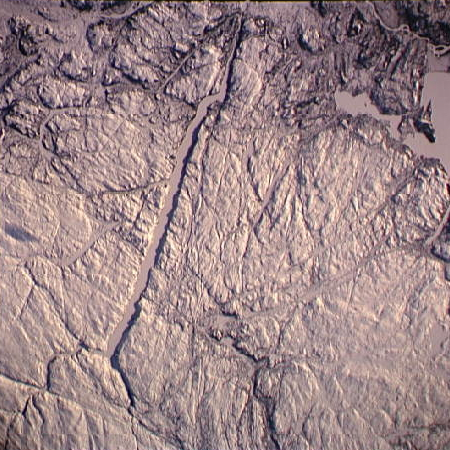
- Harp Lake as seen from space. North is on the left.
- Interactive map of Harp Lake
- Location: Labrador, Canada
- Coordinates: 55°5′15″N 61°48′54″W
- Basin countries: Canada

Harp Lake is a lake in north-central Labrador, Canada.
