= Waltham Model 1857 =

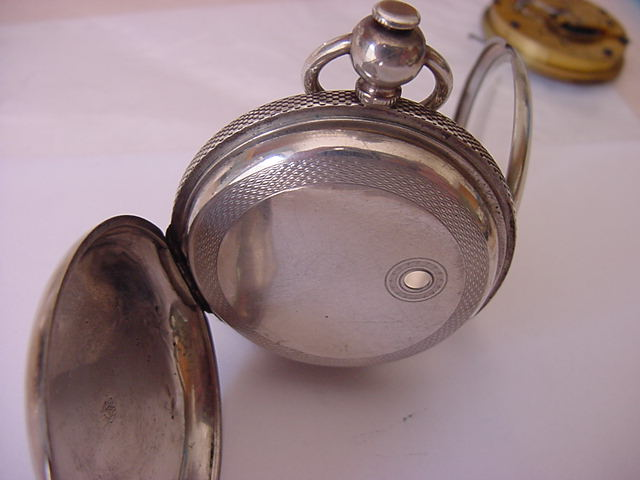
Case back showing hinges Waltham model 57 American made

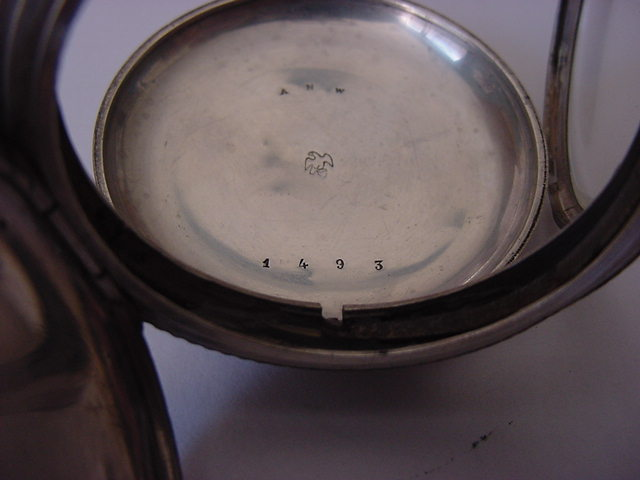
Case back inside photo with hallmark of the Waltham watch company model 57

The Waltham Model 1857 is a watch made by the American Watch Company, later called the Waltham Watch Company in Waltham, Massachusetts.

The Model 1857 was first made in 1857. Prior to that year, pocket watches were not made of standard parts and repairing and making the watches was difficult and expensive. The American Watch Company created and marketed the first successful industrialized watch.

Before 1857, The Boston Watch Company made and sold approximately 5,000 movements and 4,000 cases before it failed financially, and in the factory at the time there was an estimated 1,300 watches in various stages of production that had yet to be finished into complete watches. In the spring of 1857, the Boston Watch Company did not have enough money to stay running and was forced into insolvency.

Most pocket watches were made in England or France, so this was a test for early American manufacturing to take and produce items better than the countries in Europe, which at the time were in the middle of the industrial revolution. Most of the Model 57 pocket watches were in coin silver, which is 90% pure. American system of watch manufacturing on Wikipedia is a great side reference on the Waltham Model 57 Pocket Watch

== President Abraham Lincoln's Waltham Pocket Watch ==
In tribute, upon the Gettysburg Address, Abraham Lincoln was presented with a William Ellery, key wind watch Waltham Model 1857, serial number 67613. The watch was on permanent display at the Lincoln Savings and Loan in Los Angeles, California until March, 1977, when thieves broke in and stole the watch. To this day, it has never been recovered.

== Winding and setting the Model 57 ==
The majority of 1857 model Waltham movements are keywind from the rear and keyset from the front. A small amount of the total production of 1857 model movements were fitted with a stemwind mechanism from the factory. The earliest stemwind 1857 movements were fitted with no reversing clutch on the winding stem, and had no setting mechanism; these early movements required using a key to set the time. Later stemwind movements were lever setting, with a unique design of set lever which pivoted out from the movement rather than pulling out. Later 1857 movements also added a reversing clutch, a feature ubiquitous on all subsequent Waltham stemwind watches. All stemwind 1857 movements have the winding stem located at 3:00.

Some stemwind 1857 movements were fitted with a screw which could be used to lock the winding click into the "off" position to allow the mainspring to be let down. This feature can be identified as a small screw head on the barrel bridge with the word "patent" next to it.

Surviving 1857 model movements also occasionally turn up fitted with an Abbot's patent stemwind conversion.
