= Kalasha (finial) =

Finials of Hindu temples

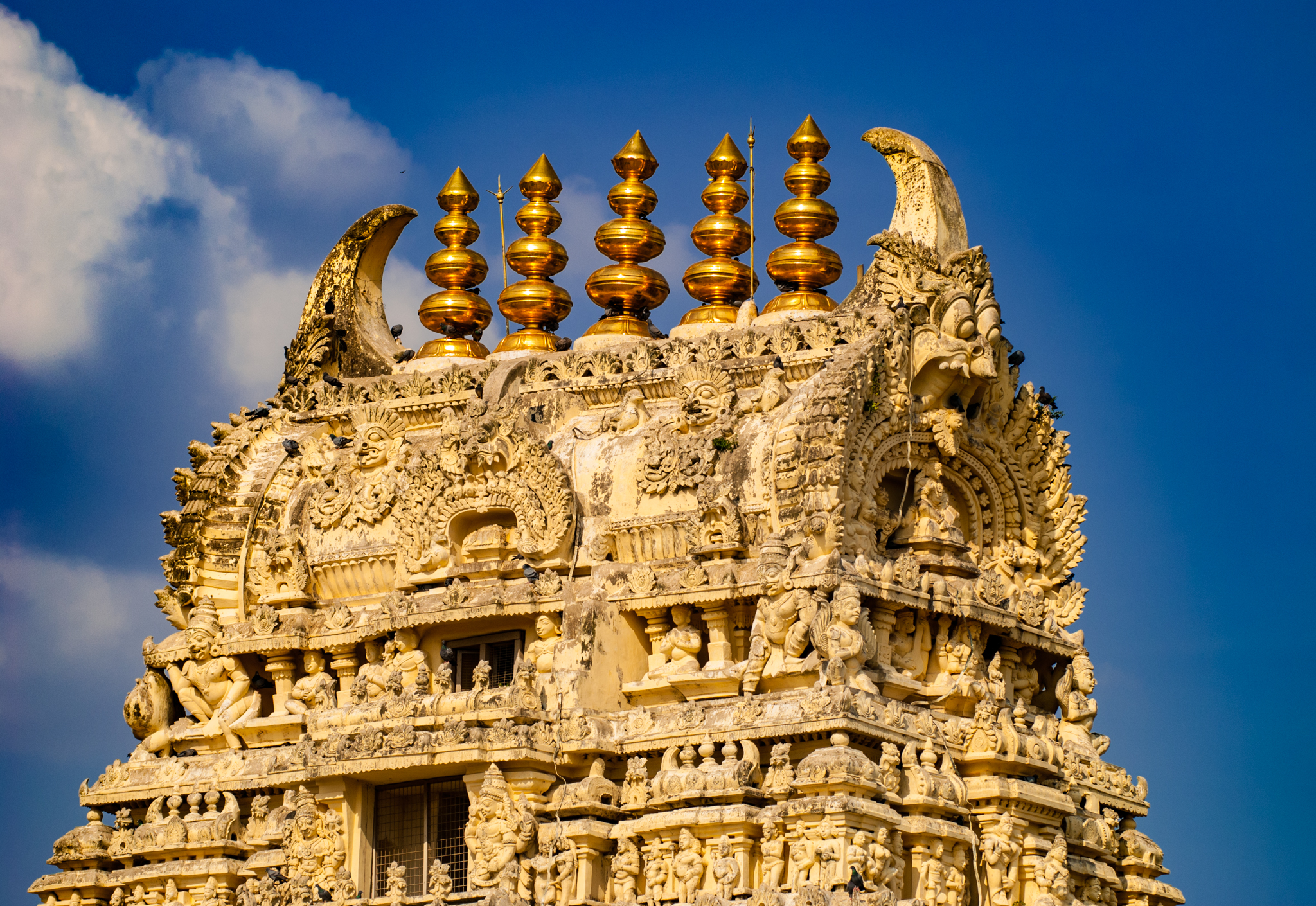
Kalashas on top of a gopuram

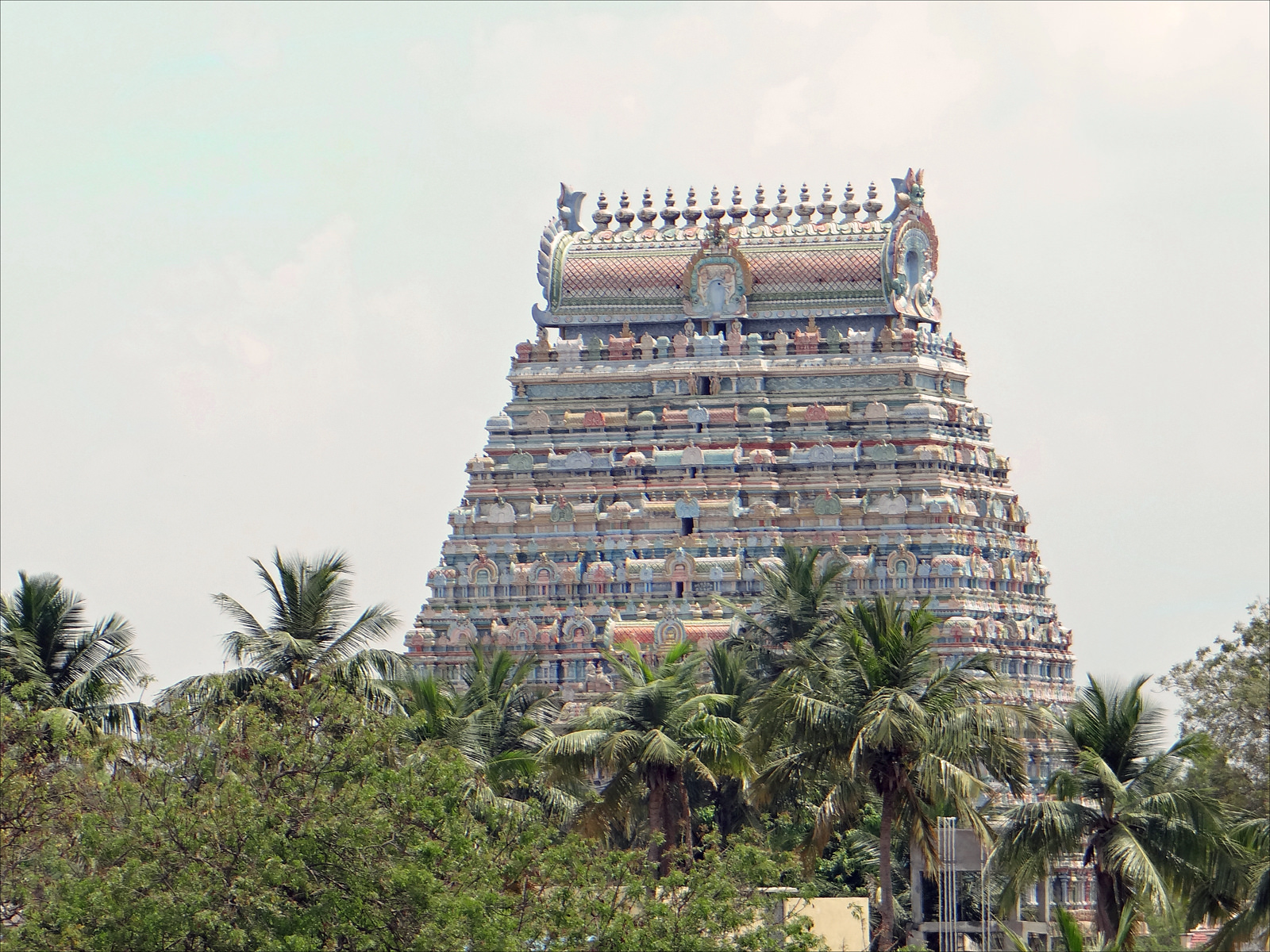
Kalashas of Srirangam temple

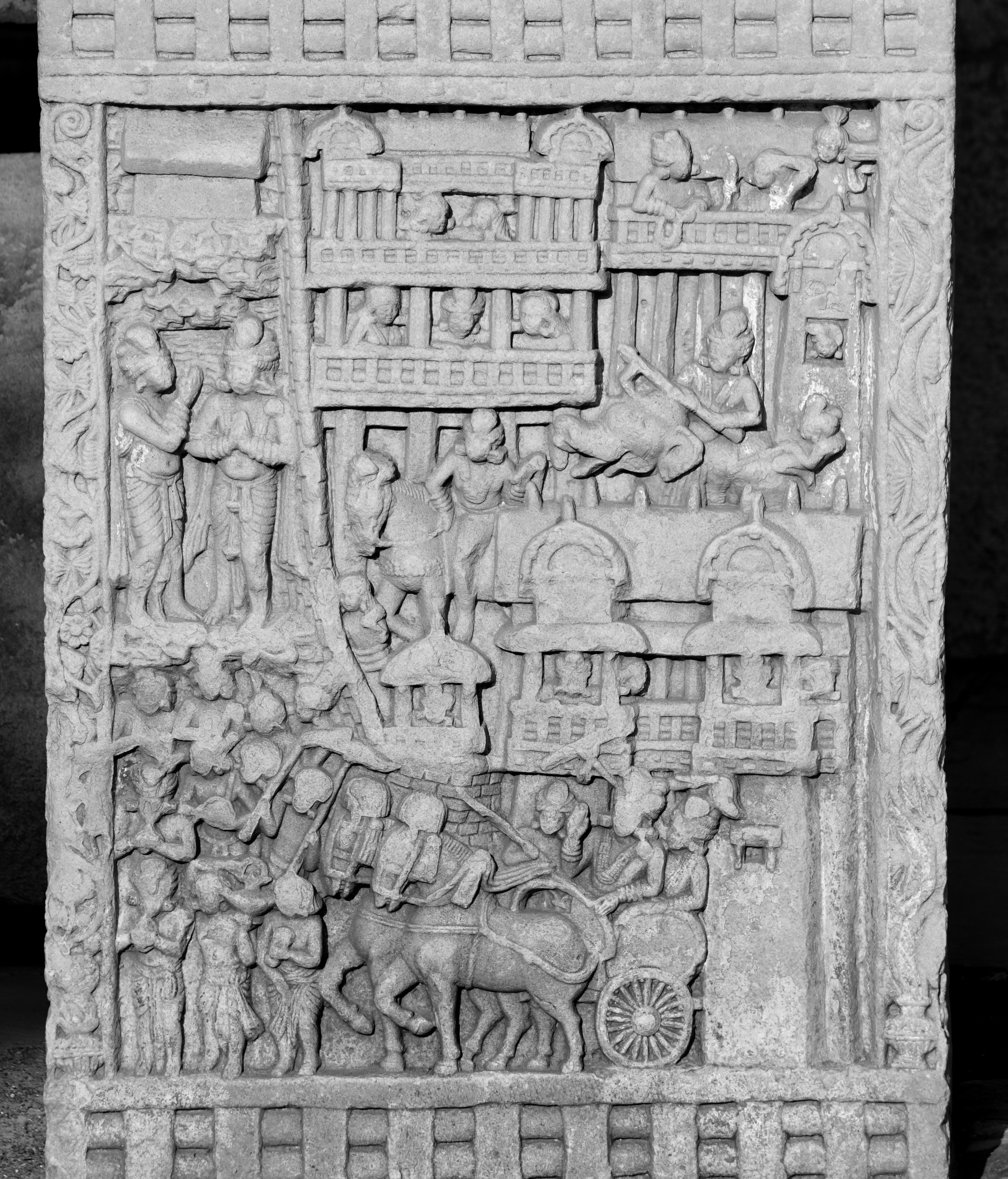
They were historically also used on various urban architecture as depicted on 1st century BCE relief.

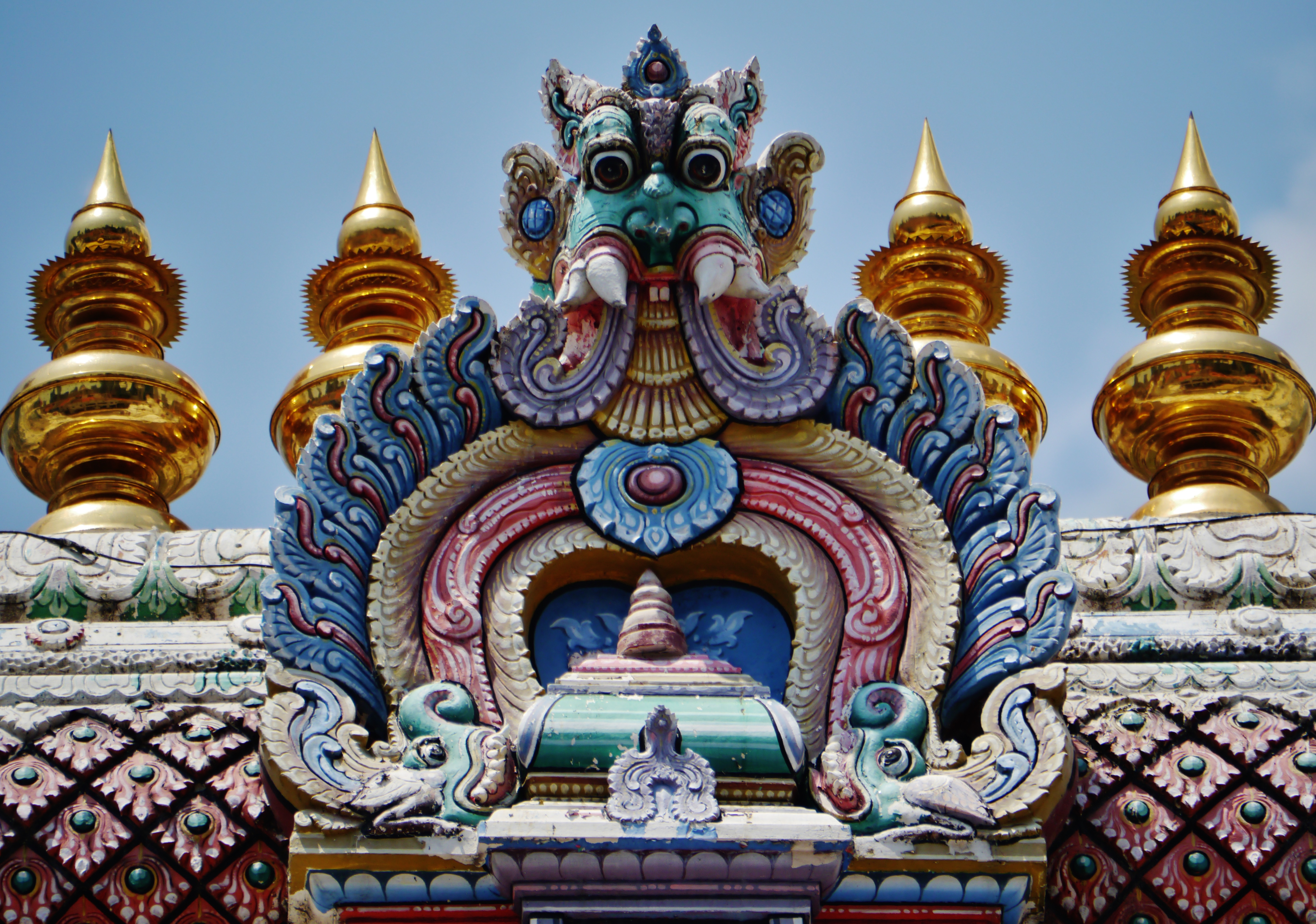
Kalashas and Kirtimukha ("glorious face")

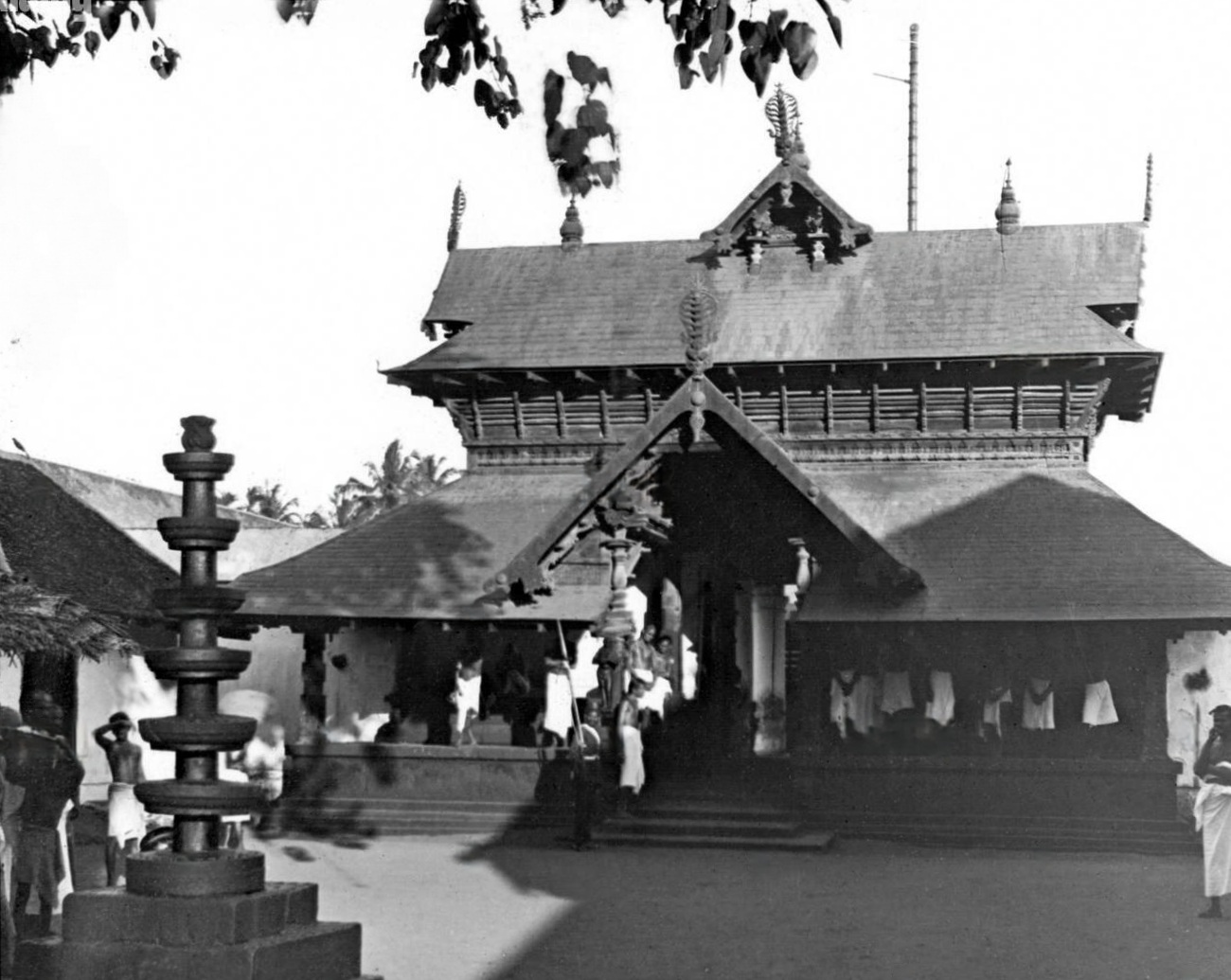
Kalashams on temple, also called thazhikakudam and stūpi in Kerala

A kalasha (Sanskrit: कलश, romanized: kalaśa) also called stupi and thazhikakudam is a finial, generally in the form of metal or stone spire, used to top the domes of Hindu temples. Kalashas as architectural feature has been used at least before the first millennium BCE and were made of terracotta and wood during this early period. They were used as decorative element placed on top of various types of buildings. They are mainly restricted to temple architecture in the contemporary period.

Present in the form of an inverted pot with a point facing the sky, kalashas are prominent elements of temple architecture. According to the Aitareya Brahmana, a golden kalasha is regarded to represent a sun upon the summit of a deity's dwelling, the temple.

Most kalashams are made of metal and some of stone. The view of the gopuram (temple tower) is one of the important rituals of Hindu worship along with view of the dhvaja stambha (temple flag mast). These gopurams are usually topped with ornamental kalashas. Kalashas are consecrated during the kumbhabhishekam ceremony and are venerated during pujas.

== Types ==
There are four types of kalashas:

- Singakalasha: It is shaped like the horn of a bull.
- Trikalasha: This is a group of three long kalashas. It is mostly used on gopurams and main gates.
- Matakakalasha: This kalasha is shaped like pitchers and earthenware pots. It appears as if pots have been placed on top of one another.
- Golakalasha: This kalasha is round and has a very small and fine tip on top.

== Materials ==
Kalashas are mostly made of metal. The main metals used are bronze and copper. In famous temples like Tirupati, noble metals like gold and silver are used.

In ancient times, temples carved out of stone had stone kalashas. Many temples like Ellora Caves, Hampi and Mahabalipuram still have these stone kalashas. In parts of South India, kalashas made of wood are common.

== Gallery ==
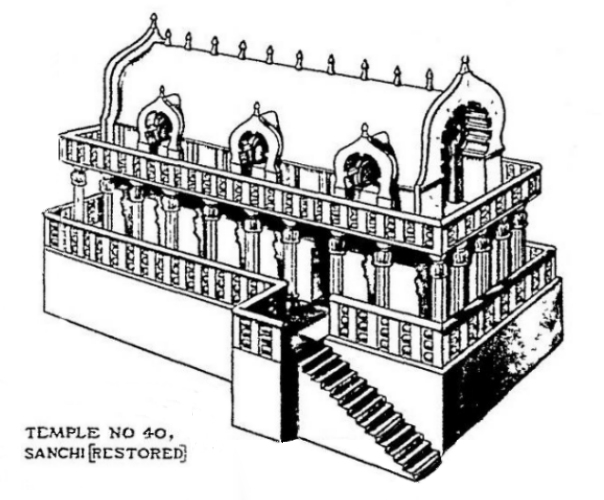
Conjectural reconstruction of the wooden 'Temple 40' at Sanchi, burnt down in the 2nd century BCE.

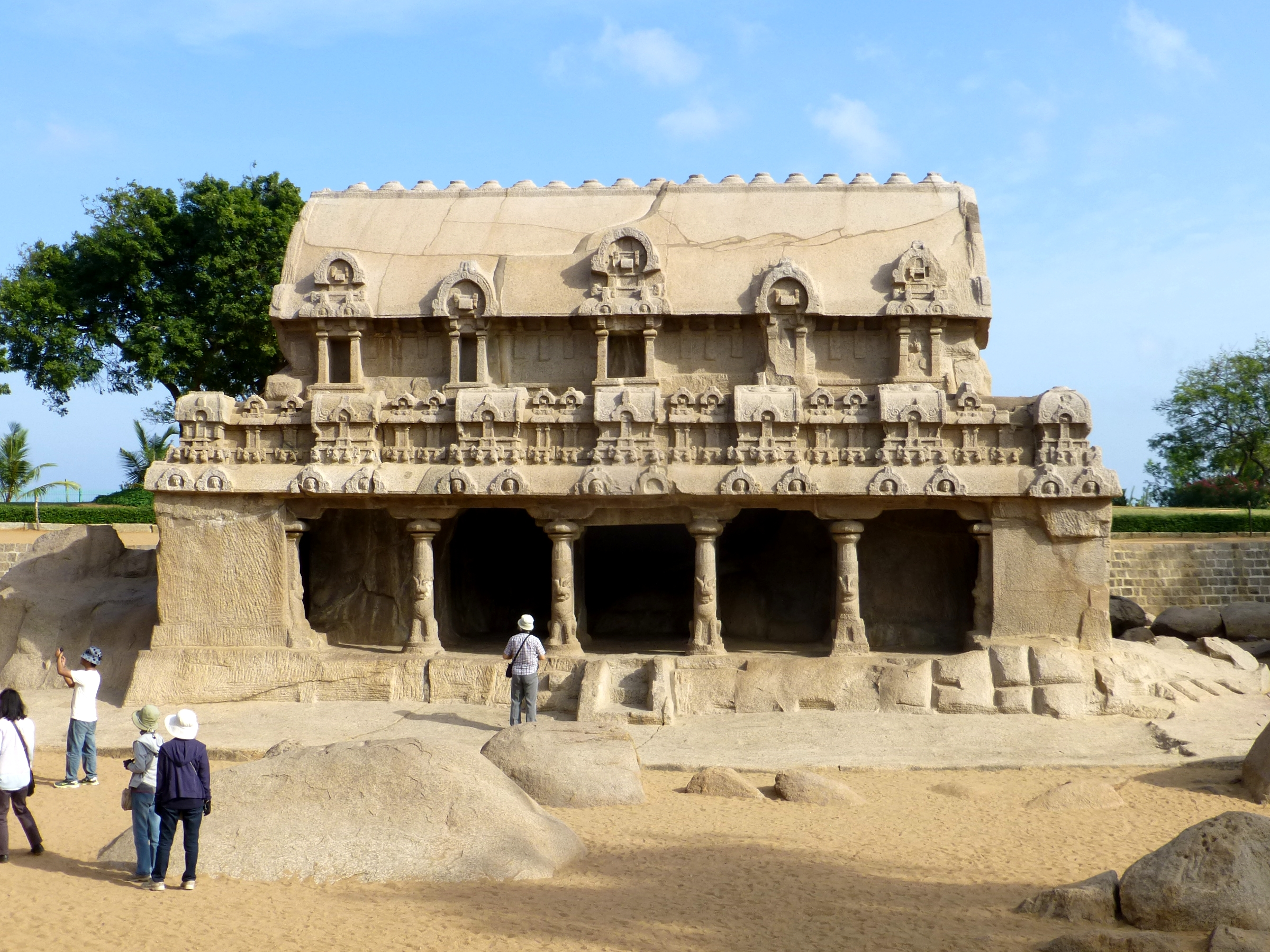
Bhima Ratha temple with rows of kalasha (now damaged) at Mahabalipuram, 600s CE.

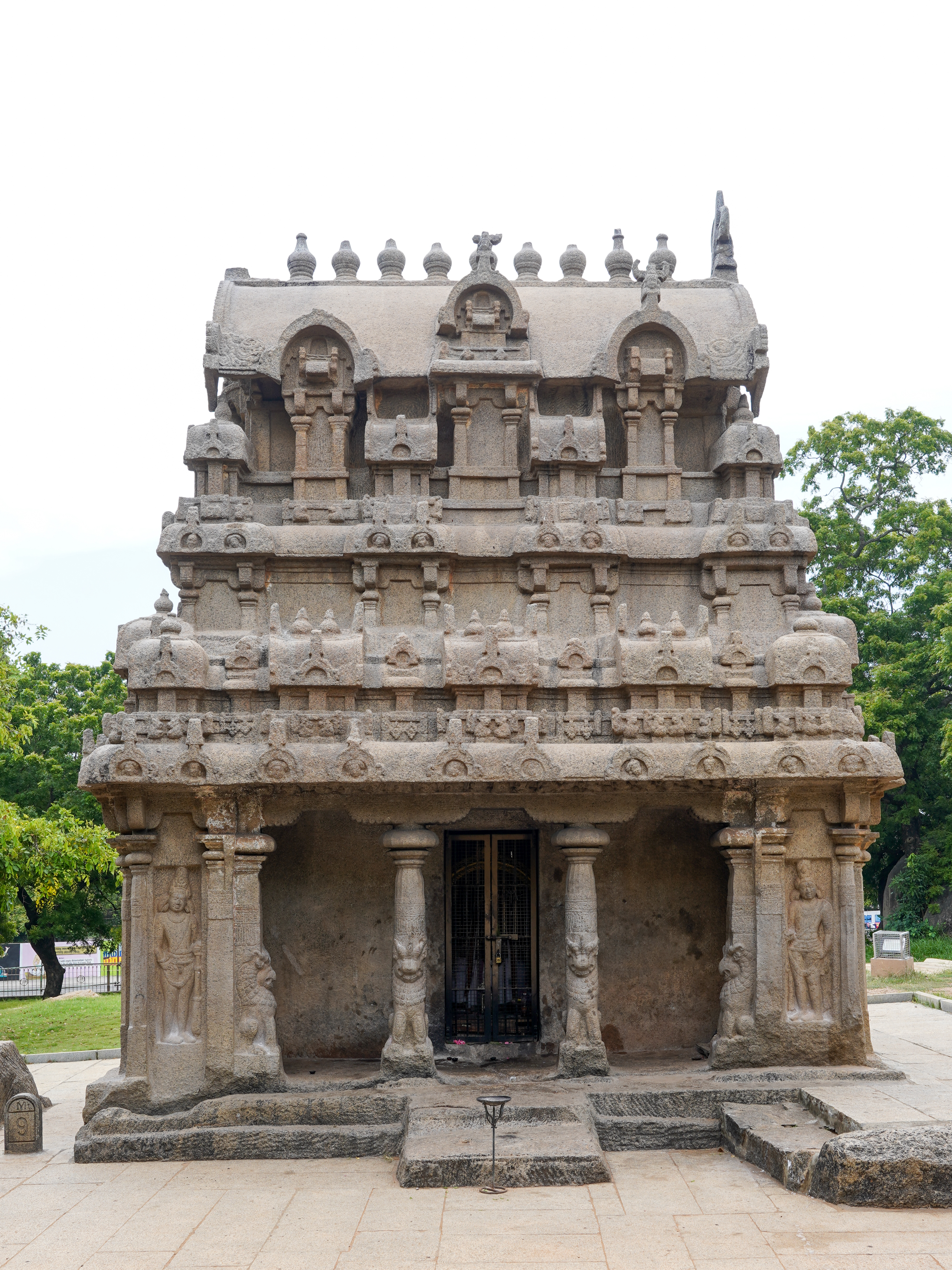
Ganesha temple at Mahabalipuram, 600s CE.

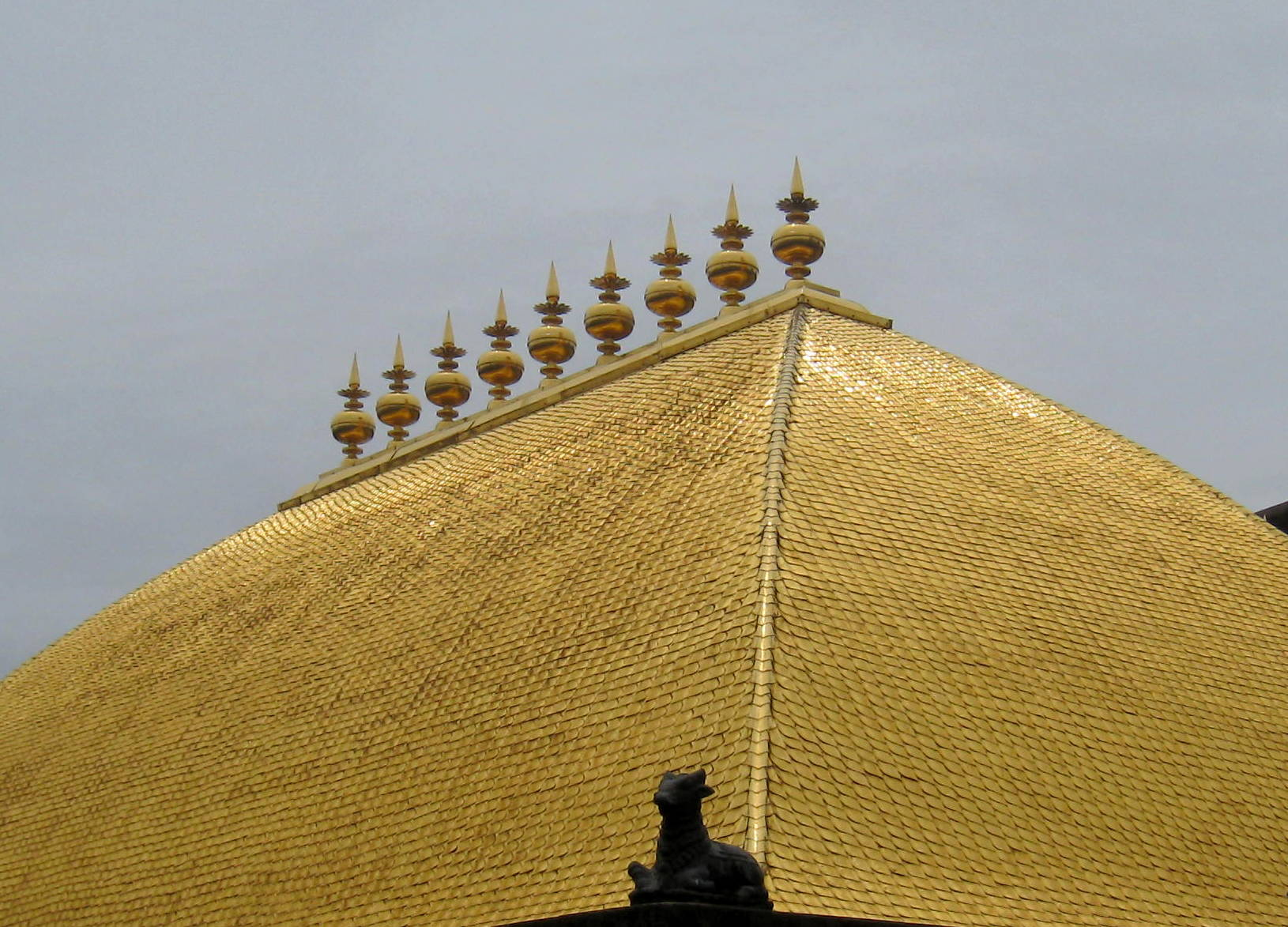
Golden roof tiles with rows of kalashas at Nataraja temple, Chidambaram, 907–955 CE.

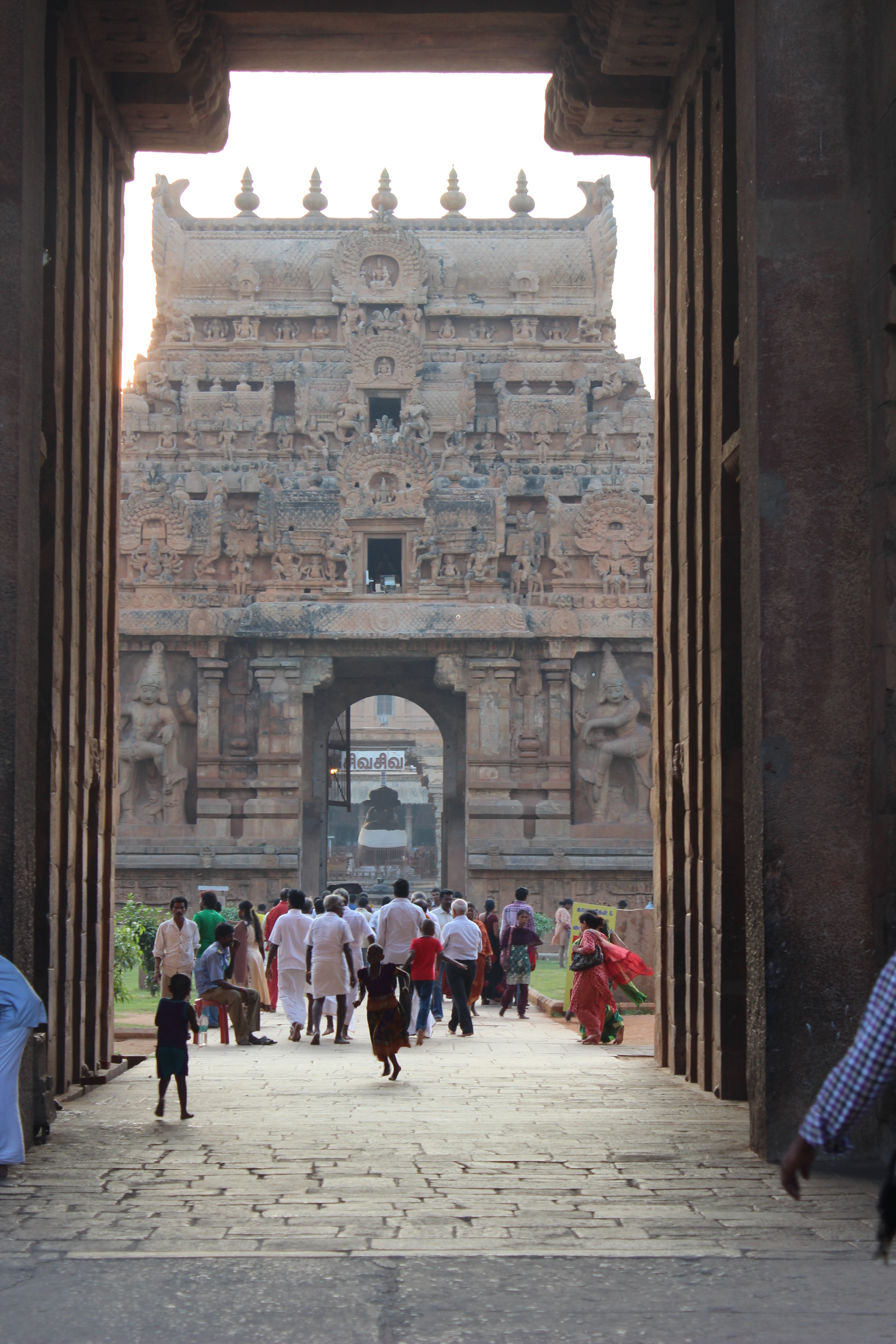
Thajavur Brihadeeswara, 1010 CE

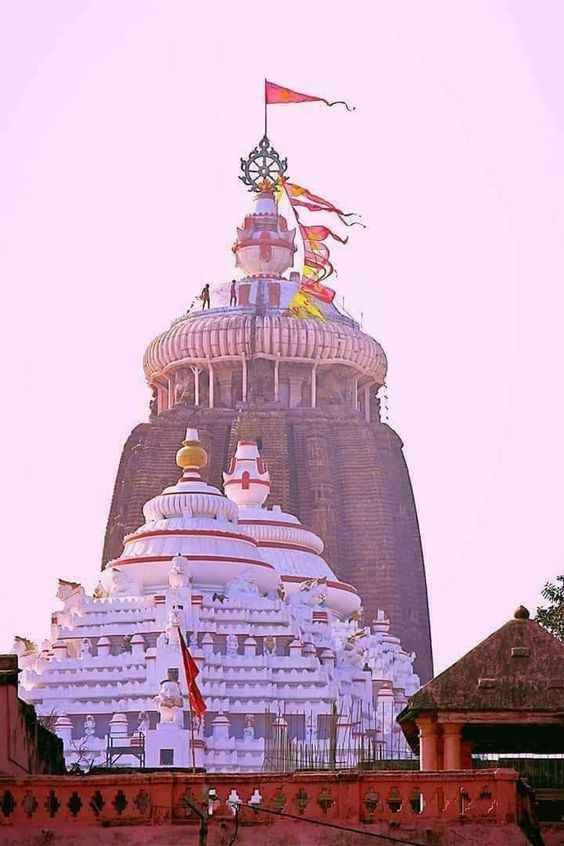
Jagannath temple, 1112-1216 CE

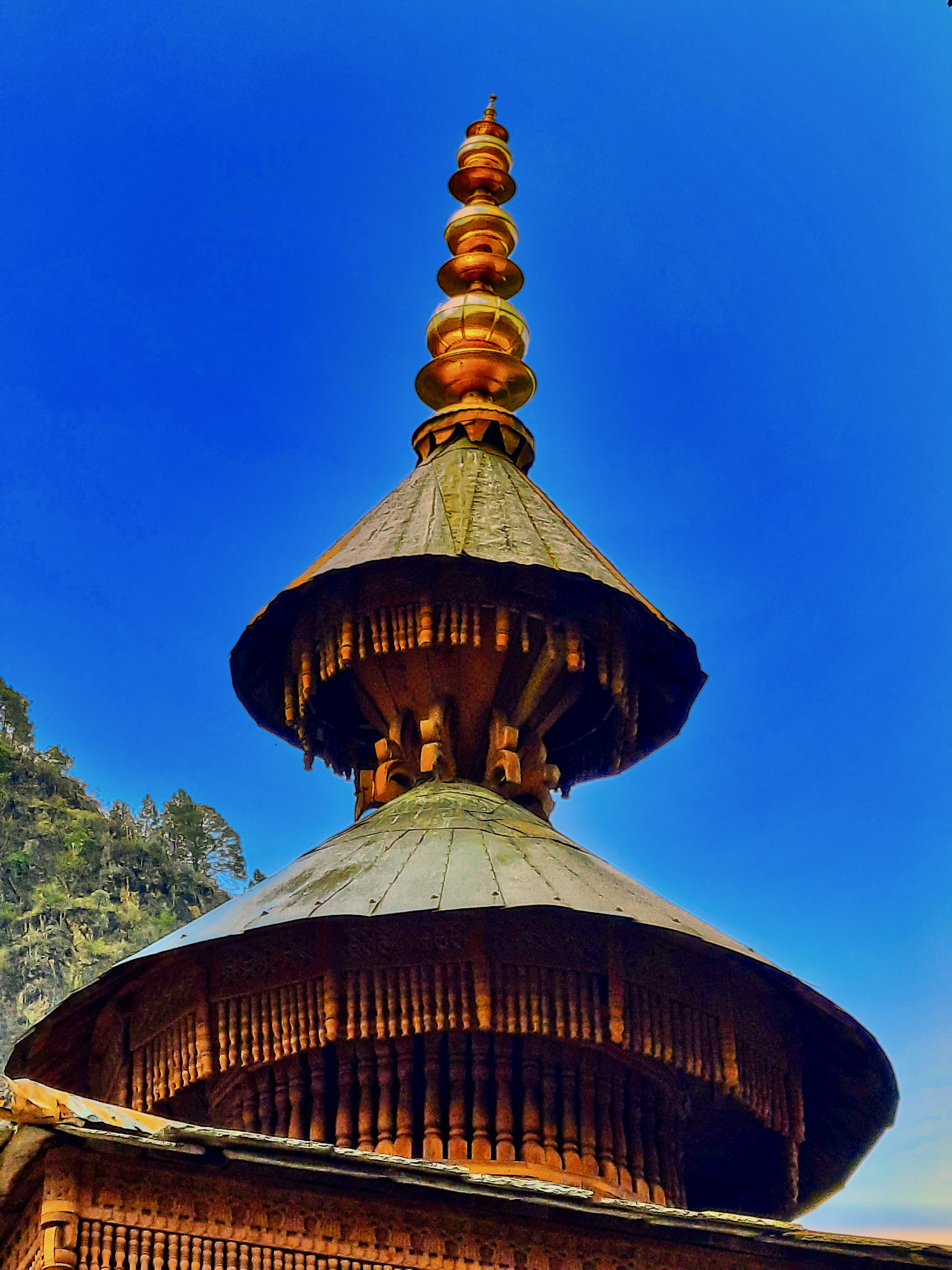
Kalash on Mahasu Devta Temple

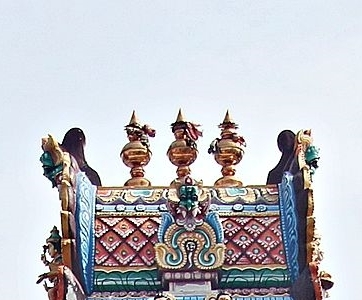
Trikalasha (three kalashas) on a gopuram in Meenakshi Temple, Madurai

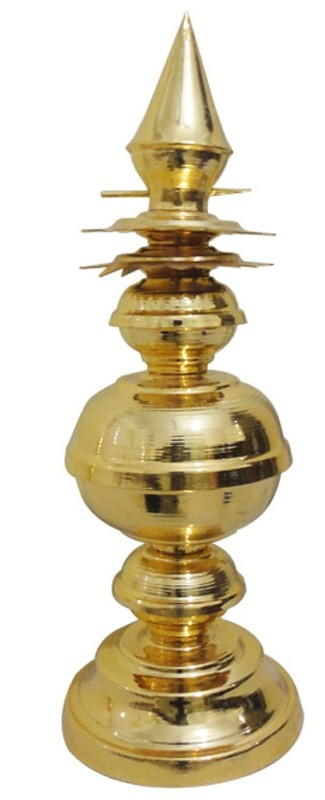
A metal matakakalasha

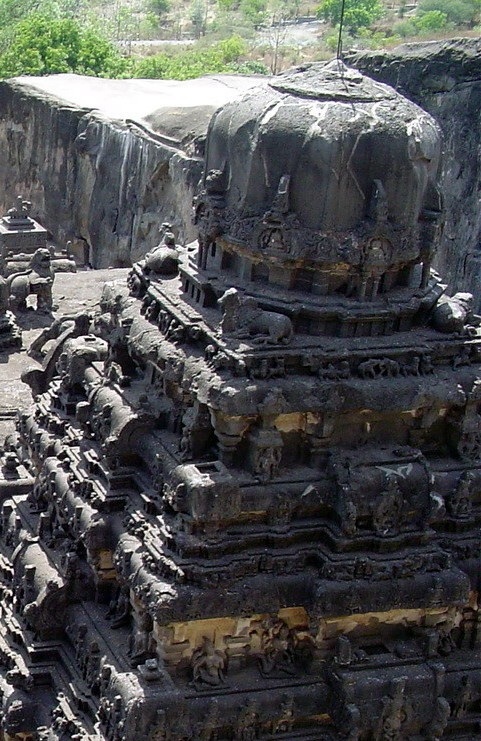
Stone carved kalasha, Kailasha Temple, Ellora Caves

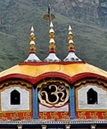
Trikalasha, Badrinath Temple

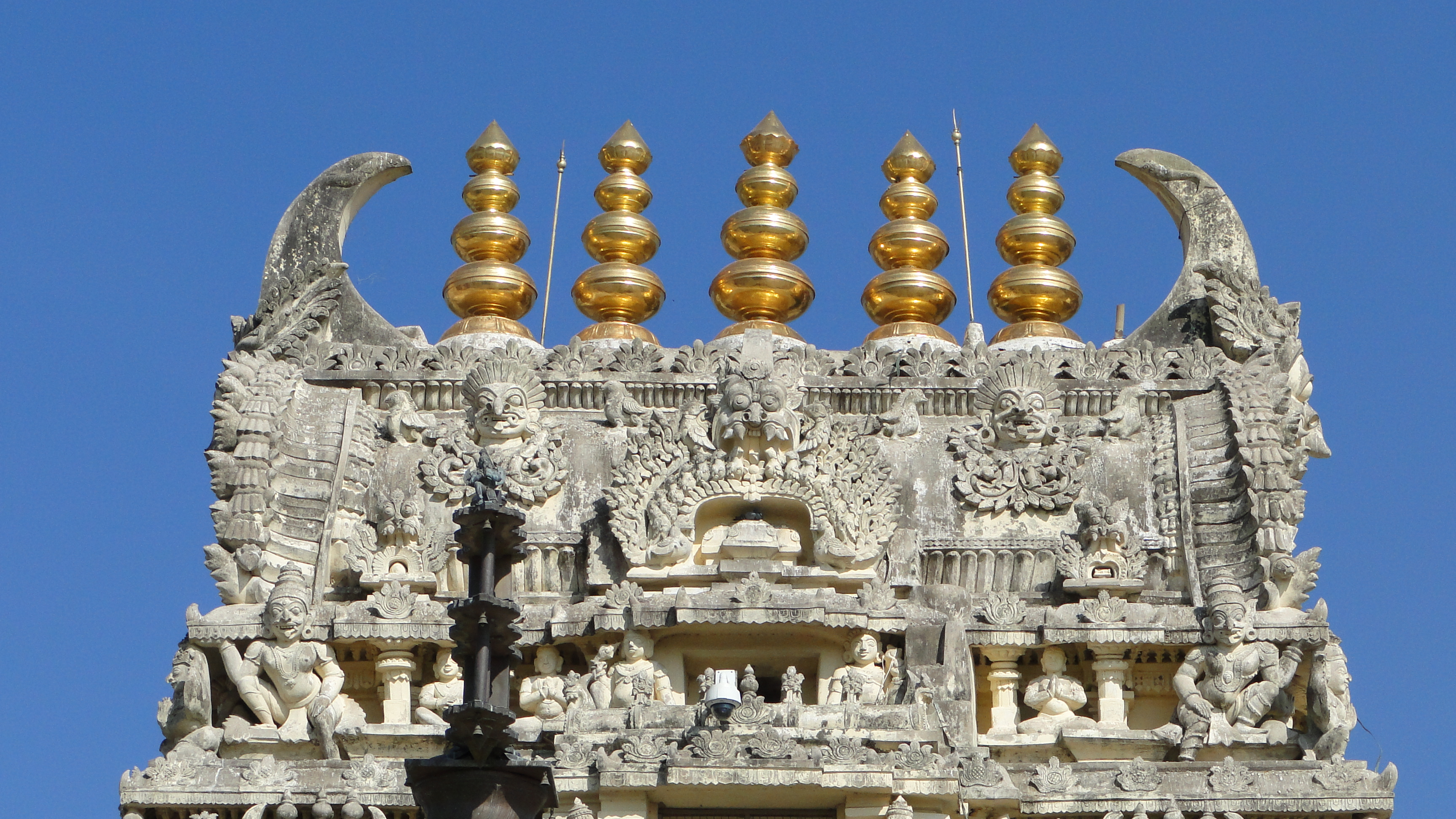
Singa kalasha, Chennakeshava Temple, Belur

Matakakalasha, Shree Samadhi Mandir, Shirdi

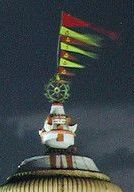
Golakalasha, Jagannath Temple, Puri

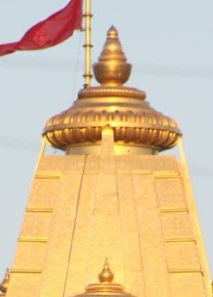
Singa kalasha, Abu Ambaji Temple, Gujarat
