= John Munro (loyalist) =

The Honourable Captain John Munro
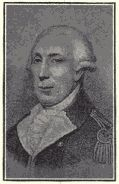

Member of the Legislative Council of Upper Canada
- In office 1792–1800

Personal details
- Born: 1728 Alness, Ross-shire, Scotland
- Died: October 27, 1800 (aged 71–72) Dickinson's Landing, Upper Canada
- Spouse: Marie Talbot Gilbert Brouwer

John Munro (1728 – October 27, 1800), was generally referred to as 'Captain The Hon. John Munro of Fowlis' to distinguish him from others with the same name and rank. He was a Highland soldier who after the Seven Years' War received extensive land grants at Albany, New York, becoming a prominent Tory and merchant associated with Simon McTavish and the fur trade. Having gained a reputation for no-nonsense, he was made a magistrate and given further land at Vermont to bring Ethan Allen and the Green Mountain Boys to order. Ever the ardent Loyalist, Munro fought for the British during the American Revolutionary War which led to the loss of his land following the American victory. He re-settled in Upper Canada, where he became a Judge and was appointed to the first Legislative Council of Upper Canada.

== Highland origins ==
John Munro was born in 1728, "the son of Hugh Munro of Fyrish, Fowlis, in the parish of Alness, in the Shire of Ross, Scotland". His precise ancestry, previously the subject of much speculation, was successfully accepted by the Court of the Lord Lyon in 1995. Both of his parents were lineally descended from the Munros of Foulis, the Chiefs of Clan Munro: His father, Hugh Munro, from George Munro, 10th Baron of Foulis and the Munros of Katewell; his mother, Christiana Munro, from the Munros of Fyrish and Robert Munro, 14th Baron of Foulis. Captain Munro named his 11,000 acre estate in Albany, New York, 'Fowlis' for Foulis Castle, the seat of his ancestors on both sides.

== Albany, New York ==
John Munro's father was of modest means and unable to purchase a commission for his son. As a sergeant-major of the 48th (Northamptonshire) Regiment of Foot, John came to North America in 1756, seeing active service in the Seven Years' War at the Battles of Louisburg and Quebec. Following the war, he was disbanded and received extensive land grants for his military service east of the Hudson River at Schenectady, Albany County, New York. This estate, which he named "Fowlis", soon came to encompass over 11,000 acres of land. He became a merchant and rapidly prospered in business, particularly in the fur trade, becoming a close lifelong friend of Simon McTavish, who sponsored one of his sons. Munro was an elder of the English Presbyterian Church in Albany, and a Magistrate for the County of Albany and the County of New York.

== Shaftesbury, Vermont ==
In about 1765, the no-nonsense attitude of Munro led him to be favoured by James Duane and John Tabor Kempe in New York. They gained for him his commission of the peace for Albany and Munro received land at Shaftsbury, Vermont, moving his family there. As one of a handful of Tories in the region he continued to farm, operating mills, a pottery, an ashery and a nail factory, but was ostensibly placed there to bring Ethan Allen and the Green Mountain Boys to order over the disputed the New Hampshire Grants.

In 1771, Munro led a group of twelve men to capture Remember Baker, raiding his mill and taking him away as a prisoner but before they could get him across the Hudson River, the Green Mountain Boys ambushed their party and rescued the prisoner. Munro reported to the governor of New York that the conflict at Baker's house was very desperate and that he had "some reason to be thankful to Divine Providence for the preservation of his life and that of his party" but that he should have succeeded in carrying Baker to Albany, if he could have had ten men in arms, but they all ran into the woods. During the capture of Baker, his gun had been taken by Munro which led to a fierce argument between him and Seth Warner, who drew his sword and struck Munro on the head. According to Ira Allen, the Scotsman's thick hair and skull saved his brains and broke Warner's sword. Munro was a prominent Tory and as such his family and property were continuously harassed in the pre-revolutionary period and he was twice imprisoned by the rebel forces.

== American Revolutionary War ==
Munro had openly declared his loyalty to the Crown even before the outset of the American Revolutionary War. He was the first Loyalist to offer his services to Colonel Allan Maclean of Torloisk and his newly formed 84th Regiment of Foot (Royal Highland Emigrants). Munro accompanied Maclean (in disguise) for two hundred miles through the hostile Province of New York "at great risk to his own life", and was instrumental in secretly enlisting many of his tenants and neighbours (many of whom were disbanded soldiers of the British and Highland Regiments) into the Royal Highland Emigrants before he was arrested and thrown into gaol at Albany.

In 1776, Munro was sentenced to hang, but the following year managed to escape across the border to Canada. At Dundas County, Munro joined Sir John Johnson (whose father, Sir William, was an old friend of Munro's and the godfather of his second son), who appointed him captain of the 1st Battalion of the King's Royal Regiment of New York. His wife and their seven children also made their escape to Canada, first settling at Montreal and then L'Assomption, Quebec, while Munro was deployed in active service over the border. By 1780, Munro was still a Captain, but promoted to major in the militia, leading a raid on Ballston,

On the 16th October, 1780, a party of 400 Regulars and Indians from Canada, under Major Munro, a Tory from Schenectady, made their appearance in the Ballston settlement. They designed to attack Schenectady, but returned without effecting this object. They pillaged several houses and took 24 prisoners

In 1781, Munro was stationed in Montreal, in charge of the housing and care of the many Loyalist refugees who ended up there, before being placed in command of the garrison at Coteau-du-Lac, Quebec. In 1783, at Sir Frederick Haldimand's request, he undertook a tour of exploration from Quebec City to Halifax via the Témiscouata route on behalf of a group of Loyalists who had obtained land in Nova Scotia. Munro reported on the route and on the suitability of lands in Nova Scotia and present-day New Brunswick.

== Upper Canada ==
In 1784, at the conclusion of the American War of Independence, Munro was placed on half-pay and settled that year with his company in Eastern District, Upper Canada. From 1784 to 1787 he was in England, supporting himself and his family in Canada on borrowed money while trying to get adequate compensation for the loss of his New York property, whose worth he estimated at more than £10,000. He eventually received less than £300 and returned to Canada disillusioned and nearly penniless. However, his character and influential friends made sure he was rewarded in other ways.

In 1788, he was made Sheriff and a member of the land board for the Luneburg District. He built and operated grist and sawmills on the Saint Lawrence River as early as 1791. Munro was one of a number of Loyalist leaders who were granted townships for settlement in 1792 and 1793. Although these grants were later rescinded, Munro and his family were given large amounts of land in Matilda Township, Ontario and elsewhere in the Eastern District including land in Chesterville. He was appointed an original member of the Legislative Council of Upper Canada on 12 July 1792, and in December of that year he became a Justice of the District Court of Common Pleas. Munro also held a number of minor or temporary posts. He was a magistrate of the Eastern District; in 1794 he served as one of the Commissioners who conferred with representatives from Lower Canada on the division of customs duties in an attempt to secure for Upper Canada a share of the revenue from goods destined for that province. In 1797, he served on the Heir and Devisee Commission, which was established to hear claims to Loyalist grants which had passed out of the hands of the original grantees.

Munro was a conscientious legislator and judge, but his public career was notable mainly for unswerving loyalty to the British Crown. Munro had acquired a further 10,000 acres of land and senior offices in Upper Canada, but he never regained the affluence he had enjoyed before the American Revolution and he died in relatively modest circumstances at his home at Dickinson's Landing. There is a memorial at Morrisburg, Ontario to Munro and his wife.

== Family ==
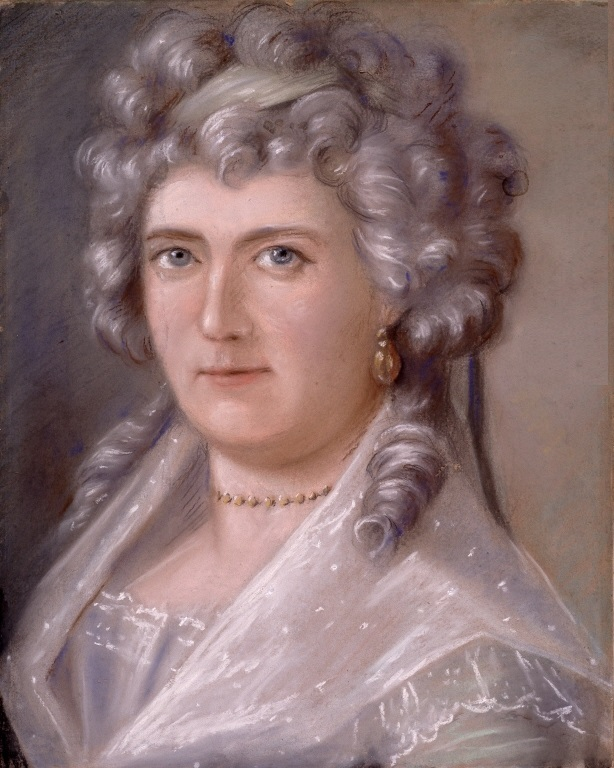
The Munros' eldest daughter, Christiana, circa 1795 at Montreal

In 1760, Munro married a member of 'a prominent Dutch family' at Albany, Marie Talbot Gilbert Brouwer (1738–1815), daughter of Cornelius Brouwer (1703–1765), a merchant whose family had come out to New Amsterdam in 1655. They were the parents of ten children. Three of their sons served under him during the American Revolutionary War and afterwards became involved with the North West Company, under the auspices of family friend, Isaac Todd. One son married the widowed sister of the fur-trader Laurent Leroux, and another, Cornelius, was the father-in-law of the Hon. Dominique Mondelet. The eldest daughter, Christiana Munro, married Dr Phillip Mount of Montreal. The next daughter, Cornelia, married Allan Paterson, one of the original members of the North West Company. The youngest daughter, Mary Charlotte Munro, married The Hon. Michel-Eustache-Gaspard-Alain Chartier de Lotbinière, de jure 2nd Marquis de Lotbinière.
