= Thomas Rowley (poet) =

American poet

Thomas Rowley (1721–1796) was a famous poet of Vermont, known both as the spokesman for Ethan Allen and dubbed “The Poet of the Green Mountains Boys.” During his lifetime and before the American Revolution, his poetry gained a reputation, as did his catchphrase "Setting the Hills on Fire."

== Biography ==
Thomas Rowley was born on March 24, 1721, in Hebron, Connecticut, the son of Samuel Rowley and Elizabeth Fuller and great grandson of Samuel Fuller (Mayflower). Thomas married Lois Cass in Hebron in 1744 and they had seven known children in Hebron and Kent, Connecticut.

Thomas Rowley moved to the town of Danby, Rutland County, Vermont, in 1768, with his wife and family. The Rowleys are listed as some of the first settlers of Danby, Thomas was the first town clerk. In Rutland County, Thomas became acquainted with and joined with Ethan Allen and the Green Mountain Boys a growing Vermont militia named after the Green Mountains of Vermont comprised mostly from freemen in Rutland County and neighboring Bennington County to the south, and Addison County to the north. The Green Mountain Boys were concerned New York would claim all the lands of Vermont known at the time as a dispute over the New Hampshire Grants. As Ethan Allen's spokesman, Rowley's poetry became legendary for the proverbial "setting the hills on fire." That is, he motivated the men of Vermont to fight for their independence as a state against the threat of the New York state feudal system.

As early as 1774, Thomas Rowley moved even further north to the eastern shore of Lake Champlain to the town of Shoreham in Addison County, Vermont, with his wife and family. The state of New York was visible right across the lake. Here Thomas built a hotel. His land was known as "Rowley's Point" at the current landmark of Larabee's Point.

During the American Revolution, the American settlers abandoned Shoreham and the Champlain Valley as the British dominated the lake region. Thomas returned to live in the town of Danby during the American Revolution. He served as Danby's town clerk and representative in the General Assembly from 1778 to 1782.

After the war ended, Thomas Rowley returned to live in Shoreham as early as 1783. He is on record serving as the initial surveyor and clerk of Shoreham in 1783. He resided in Shoreham for the rest of his life as an innkeeper and farmer. Thomas died 1796 in the village of Cold Springs, in the town of West Haven, Vermont, at the home of his son, Nathan Rowley.

== Poetry and influence ==
Thomas Rowley's verses were mainly published in the Rural Magazine and the Bennington Gazette. One of Rowley's motivational poems, simply called "To Rutland Go" over the years, was originally published with a longer title which invited new settlers to Vermont as the paradise compared to New York, as follows: An Invitation to the Poor Tenants that Live Under Their Poor Patrons in the Province of New York, To Come and Settle on Our Good Lands, Under the New Hampshire Grants. This poem is exemplary of his style and message:

West of the Mountains Green
Lies Rutland Fair
The best that ever was seen
For land and air...
We value not New York
With all her Powers
Here we'll stay and Work
The land is Ours...
This is the noble land by conquest won
Took from a savage band by sword and gun
We drove them to the west, they could not stand the test

— from "To Rutland Go” by Thomas Rowley, 1760s, The Rural Magazine, or Vermont Repository, Volume 1 #7 (July, 1795, pages 383 - 385.

Rowley's poetry actually focused not only on politics, but also on the pleasantness and rustic nature of pioneer life, with humor and witty observations. For example, in another poetic inventory of his "estate", he sums up that he has virtually nothing, but still he was independent and happy.

=== Notable poems ===
- To Rutland Go
- When Caesar Reigned King In Rome
  - This poem was written to complain that New York courts sentenced Ethan Allen to death, circa 1774 and attached to a petition by Ethan Allen.
