= John C. Munro =

John C. Munro may refer to:

- John Munro (Canadian politician) (John Carr Munro), member of parliament for Hamilton, Ontario
- John Campbell Munro, Scottish-born Australian folk musician
- John C. Munro (clipper), an iron full-rigged ship built in 1862

== See also ==
- John Munro (disambiguation)
