= John Monro =

John Monro may refer to:

- John Monro (advocate) (1725–1773), Scottish advocate
- John Monro (physician) (1716–1791), physician and specialist in insanity
- John Monro (surgeon) (1670–1740), Scottish surgeon
- John U. Monro (1912–2002), American academic administrator

== See also ==
- Charles John Monro, credited with bringing rugby union to New Zealand
- Monro of Fyrish
- John Monroe (disambiguation)
- John Munro (disambiguation)
