= Westminster Massacre =

Coordinates: 43.0724°N 72.4625°W

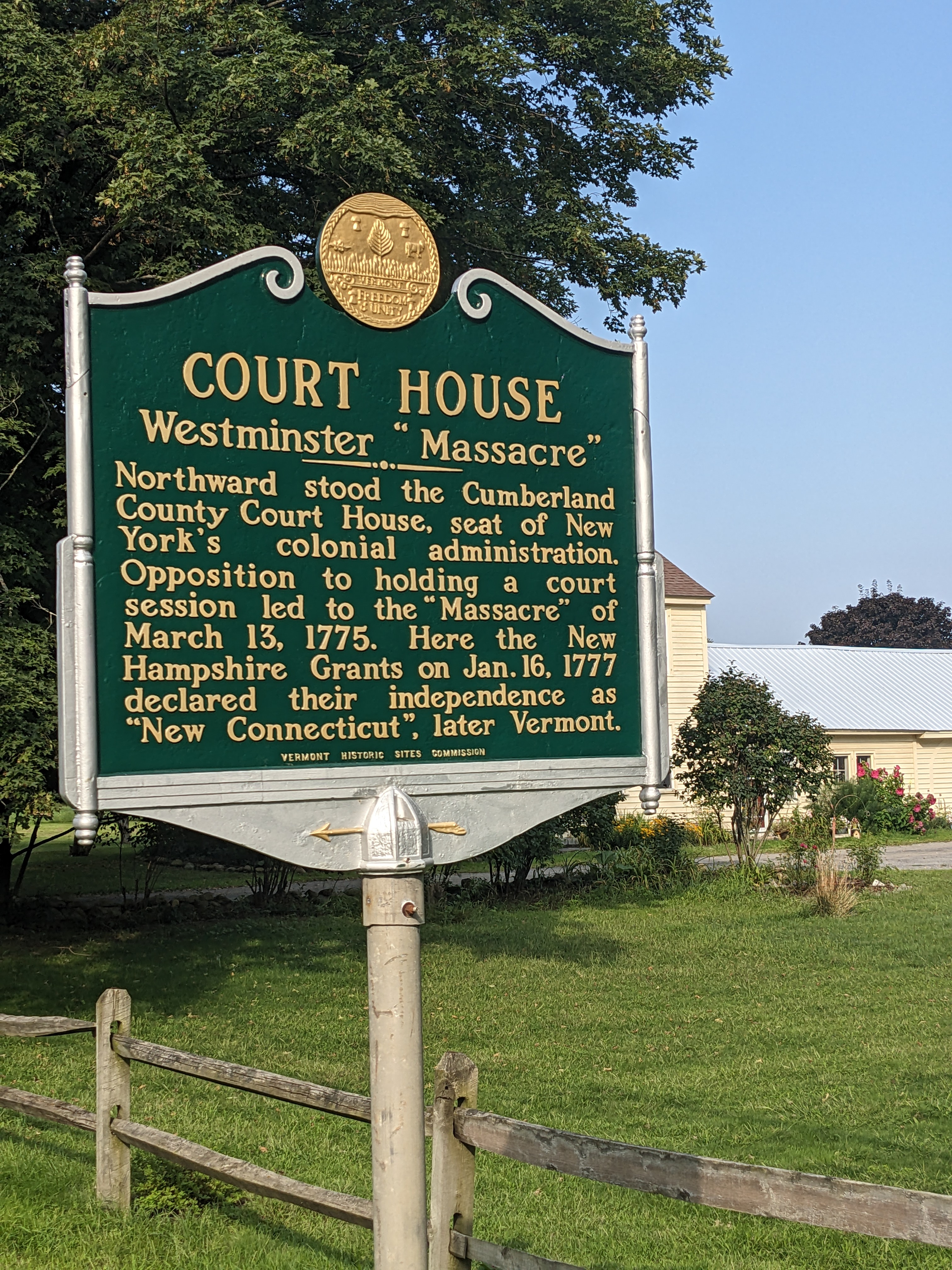
Historical marker in Westminster. The word massacre is in scare quotes, probably because only two men were killed, which would not fit the conventional definition of a massacre.

The Westminster Massacre was an incident that occurred on March 13, 1775, in the town of Westminster, Vermont, then part of the New Hampshire Grants, whose control was disputed between its residents and the Province of New York. It resulted in the killings of two men, William French and Daniel Houghton, by a sheriff's posse, after a crowd occupied the Westminster Courthouse to protest the evictions of several poor farmers from their homes by judges and other officials from New York. The Westminster Massacre is regarded by some Vermont historians as a key event in the history of Vermont.

== Background ==
The New Hampshire Grants had been made starting in 1749 on territory west of the Connecticut River on land claimed by both Province of New Hampshire and the Province of New York. On July 20, 1764, King George III declared that the west bank of the Connecticut River was the western boundary of New Hampshire, and New York declared the grants made by New Hampshire to be invalid, legally dispossessing settlers of their land. Attempts at enforcement generated resistance and tension between the majority of residents - lower-class farmers from New Hampshire - and "Yorkers", a wealthy minority of landowners from New York.

Surveyors employed by the Yorkers were often attacked and beaten by angry farmers, who formed the radical Green Mountain Boys, an anti-Yorker militia led by Ethan Allen and Remember Baker. The Green Mountain Boys began destroying the homes of Yorkers who settled in the New Hampshire Grants. Many of these Yorkers had taken land from impoverished farmers. In response to the attacks on Yorkers, officials from New York began arresting and evicting settlers across the New Hampshire Grants.

== The incident ==
On March 13, 1775, a group of "riotous and disorderly persons...[numbering] between eighty and ninety" assembled outside the Westminster Courthouse to protest the arrival of a judge from New York, along with several settlers from New York. In an effort to prevent "the session of the county court scheduled for the following day." Many members of the "riotous and disordley" crowd were "pro-Independence Whigs." The number of people occupying the courthouse soon numbered in the hundreds, and many were armed with clubs and firearms. The "rioters" were ordered to leave the courthouse by Sheriff William Patterson. When the rioters refused to disperse and end their "riotous assembly", Patterson rode to the town of Brattleboro, a Yorker stronghold, and recruited "25 residents for the purpose of 'keeping the peace'".

By 9:00 pm, when Patterson returned to Westminster with a posse of "60 to 70 armed men", the rioters were in control of both the courthouse and local jail. Once again, Patterson ordered the rioters to disperse, and once again the rioters refused, after which the sheriff commanded his men to fire into the courthouse to frighten the rioters. The rioters returned fire, "slightly wounding" a magistrate who had accompanied the sheriff's posse. Patterson's men proceeded to storm the courthouse, armed with swords and guns. Once they broke down the courthouse door Patterson's posse began shooting into the crowd, killing William French in the moments after they entered. French was shot five times, and died immediately. One eyewitness described the chaos that ensued:

They rushed in with their guns, swords, and clubs, and did most cruelly maim several more, and took some that were not wounded, and those that were, and crowded them all into close prison together, and then told them they should be in hell before the next night, and that they did wish that there were forty more in the same case with that dying man [William French]. When they put him [French] into prison, they took and dragged him as one would a dog, and would mock him as he lay gasping, and make sport for themselves.

The opposing sides fought each other in hand-to-hand combat, in which many of the rioters were injured. The rioters poured out of the courthouse as Patterson's men continued to shoot. One of the rioters, Daniel Houghton, was shot and beaten so brutally that he died from his wounds nine days later.

== Aftermath: Vermont's independence ==
After the massacre, seven of the rioters were caught by Sheriff Patterson's posse and thrown into the local jail. News of the massacre spread quickly throughout New England and New York, partly because many of the rioters rode to neighboring towns and told locals how the sheriff's posse had killed William French.

The following day an angry mob of "upwards of 500", that included local farmers and teens as well as militias from the towns of Guilford, Westminster, and the counties of Windham, Bennington, and Albany, and even as far away as New Hampshire (the courthouse was located near the Connecticut River and New Hampshire), descended upon Westminster. The mob surrounded the courthouse and "took [with them] the judges, the sheriffs, the clerk" and local Yorkers, who were paraded through town to the town jail. The mob broke into the town jail, freeing all the prisoners, including the seven rioters who had been arrested, and proceeded to lock up the officials and Yorkers they had dragged through Westminster. The mob then searched the area for more Yorker leaders, who they captured and imprisoned in Northampton, Massachusetts. The mob continued south to Brattleboro, where they broke into the homes of prominent Yorkers, including Samuel Gale and Benjamin Butterfield, who, along with several other Brattleboro Yorkers, were brought to Northampton and imprisoned alongside others the mob had already captured. The mob, which still numbered in the four hundreds, chased attorney Samuel Knight out of Brattleboro. Militias set up roadblocks in the countryside surrounding Westminster, who held people they believed to be loyalists or Yorker officials at gunpoint, then handed them over to search parties who brought the "Yorkers" to Northampton. A few days later, the mob created a committee who "charged" five of the prisoners with the murder of William French.

The Westminster events so impressed Vermonters that the following year, they chose the Westminster courthouse as location for their declaration that the Vermont Republic was now an independent nation, not a colony.

== See also ==
- List of massacres in the United States
- Green Mountain Boys
