= John Monroe =

John Monroe may refer to:

- John Monroe (lawyer) (1839–1899), Irish lawyer
- John T. Monroe (1822–1871), U.S. politician, mayor of New Orleans
- John Monroe (speed skater), former Canadian speed skater
- John Monroe (baseball) (1898–1956), Major League Baseball infielder
- John Monroe, alter ego of Weasel (DC Comics)

== See also ==
- Jack Monroe (disambiguation)
- John Monro of the Monro family (physicians)
- John Munro (disambiguation)
