= John Munro =

John Munro may refer to:

== Political figures ==
- J. B. Munro (1936–2018), New Zealand politician, represented Invercargill electorate
- John Farquhar Munro (1934–2014), Scottish Liberal Democrat MSP
- John Munro (Canadian politician) (1931–2003), Canadian Member of Parliament and cabinet minister
- John Munro (New Zealand politician born 1839) (1839–1910), New Zealand politician, represented Buller electorate
- John W. Munro (fl. 1900s), Scottish-born Canadian politician
- John Munro (New Zealand politician born c. 1798) (c. 1798–1879), New Zealand politician, represented Marsden electorate
- John Munro (loyalist) (1728–1800), United Empire Loyalist and political figure in Upper Canada
- Sir John Munro, 4th Baronet (died 1697), Scottish baronet
- John Munro, 11th Baron of Foulis (died 1491), Scottish clan chief of the highland Clan Munro in Ross-shire, Scotland

== Writers ==
- John Munro (poet) (1889–1918), Scottish soldier and poet
- John Munro (author) (1849–1930), English author whose A Trip to Venus was excerpted in Farewell Fantastic Venus
- John Neil Munro (fl. 1990s), Scottish journalist and author of biographies

== Others ==
- John Munro (sportsman) (1928–2013), Western Australian cricketer and WAFL player
- Arthur Munro (John Arthur Ruskin Munro, 1864–1944), rector of Lincoln College, Oxford, 1919–44
- John Munro, 9th of Teaninich (1778–1858), Scottish soldier and statesman in India
- John Munro, 4th of Newmore (died 1749), Scottish-British military officer
- John Munro of Tain (died 1630), Scottish Presbyterian minister
- John Campbell Munro (1947-2018), Scottish-born Australian folk musician
- John Munro (surgeon) (1670–1740), Scottish surgeon
- Les Munro (John Leslie Munro, 1919–2015), New Zealand "Dambuster" Air Force pilot
- John Hay Munro (born 1948), pastor of Calvary Church, Charlotte, North Carolina
- John M. M. Munro (1853–1925), Scottish businessman and electrical engineer
- John Munro of Lemlair, Scottish soldier
- John C. Munro (clipper), an iron full-rigged ship built in 1862

== See also ==
- John Munroe (1796–1861), United States soldier and military governor of New Mexico
- John H. Munroe (1820–1885), Ontario real estate agent and political figure
- John Monroe (disambiguation)
- John Monro (disambiguation)
