= Jack Monroe (disambiguation) =

Jack Monroe is a British writer and campaigner.

Jack Monroe may also refer to:

- Jack Monroe (character), a Marvel Comics character
- Jack Monroe (song), a British folk song

== See also ==
- John Monroe (disambiguation)
- Jack Munro (1873–1948), British trade unionist
