= John Monroe (speed skater) =

John Monroe (born September 25, 1960) is a former Canadian skater and currently works as a coach.

Monroe is a two-time medallist at Canadian Short track speed skating Championships and was crowned the 1990 North American Short Track Champion. He was also a member of the World Inline Speedskating Team for five years. When asked to describe inline skating Monroe said "A description of inline speed skating? NASCAR on skates.".

After his career he started as a coach for the Canadian Inline Speedskating Team at the 1999 Pan-American Games. He also worked as an assistant coach of the American national speed skating team, coaching Shani Davis and others. In 2006 he became coach of the national short track speed skating team of the Netherlands to replace Jan Herman Mogendorff. Monroe takes part in the ambitious plan of the Royal Dutch Speed Skating Association (KNSB), to be successful at the 2010 Winter Olympics in Vancouver, British Columbia. He will be assisted by former Dutch short track speed skater Dave Versteeg.
