= Green Mountain Boys =

Militia organization first established in 1770

- Digital reconstruction of the Flag of the Green Mountain Boys, predating the Vermont Republic. The flag is currently used by the Vermont National Guard
- Active: October 24, 1764–1776
- Country: Great Britain; Vermont Republic; United States
- Allegiance: Vermont Republic
- Type: Militia
- Part of: Vermont Militia
- Colors: Green, blue, white (gold fringe is modern decorative)
- Engagements: American Revolutionary War; Fort Ticonderoga; Invasion of Quebec; Hubbardton; Bennington

Commanders
- Notable commanders: Ethan Allen; Ira Allen; Seth Warner; Remember Baker

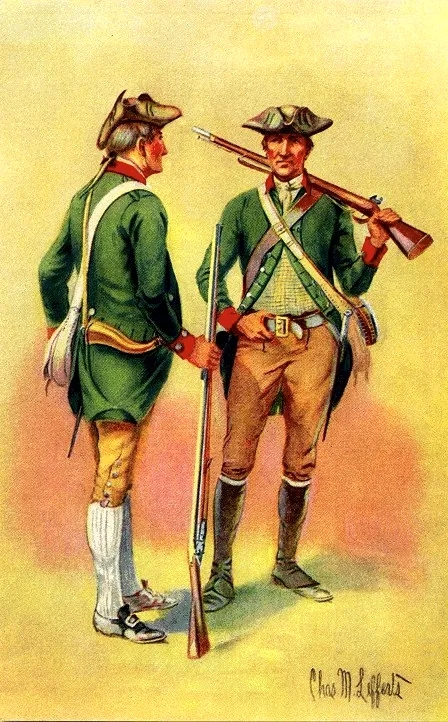
Green Mountain Rangers, 1776

The Green Mountain Boys were a militia organization established in 1770 in the territory between the British provinces of New York and New Hampshire, known as the New Hampshire Grants and later in 1777 as the Vermont Republic (which later became the state of Vermont). Headed by Ethan Allen and members of his extended family, it was instrumental in resisting New York's attempts to control the territory, over which it had won de jure control in a territorial dispute with New Hampshire.

Some companies served in the American Revolutionary War, including notably when the Green Mountain Boys, led under the command of Ethan Allen while being assisted by Benedict Arnold, captured Fort Ticonderoga on Lake Champlain on May 10, 1775, and invaded Canada later in 1775. In early June 1775, Ethan Allen and his then subordinate, Seth Warner, induced the Continental Congress at Philadelphia to create a Continental Army ranger regiment from the then New Hampshire Grants. Having no treasury, the Congress directed that New York's revolutionary Congress pay for the newly authorized regiment. In July 1775, Allen's militia was granted support from the New York revolutionary Congress.

The Green Mountain Boys disbanded more than a year before Vermont declared its independence in 1777 from Great Britain "as a separate, free and independent jurisdiction or state". The Vermont Republic operated for 14 years, before being admitted in 1791 to the United States as the 14th state.

The remnants of the Green Mountain Boys militia were largely reconstituted as the Green Mountain Continental Rangers. Command of the newly formed regiment passed from Allen to Seth Warner. Allen joined the staff of the Northern Army of New York's Major General Philip Schuyler and was given the rank of lieutenant colonel. Under Warner the regiment fought at the battles of Hubbardton and Bennington in 1777. The regiment was disbanded in 1779.

== History ==
The original Green Mountain Boys were a militia organized in what is now southwestern Vermont in the decade prior to the American Revolutionary War. They consisted of settlers and land speculators who held New Hampshire titles to lands between the Connecticut River and Lake Champlain; the area was then known as the New Hampshire Grants, but is now modern Vermont. New York was given legal control of the area by a decision of the British crown and refused to respect the New Hampshire titles and town charters. Although a few towns with New York land titles, notably Brattleboro on the Connecticut River, supported the change, the vast majority of the settlers in the sparsely populated frontier region rejected the authority of New York.

With several hundred members, the Green Mountain Boys effectively controlled the area where New Hampshire grants had been issued. They were led by Ethan Allen, his brother Ira Allen, and their cousins Seth Warner and Remember Baker. They were based at the Catamount Tavern in Bennington. By the 1770s, the Green Mountain Boys had become an armed military force and de facto government, which was also a militia, that prevented New York from exercising its authority in the northeast portion of the Province of New York. New York authorities had standing warrants for the arrest of the leaders of the rebellious Vermonters but were unable to exercise them. New York surveyors and other officials attempting to exercise their authority were prevented from doing so and in some cases were severely beaten, and settlers arriving to clear and work land under New York–issued grants were forced off their land, and sometimes had their possessions destroyed. At the same time, New York sought to extend its authority over the territory. During an event once known as the Westminster massacre, anti-Yorkers occupied the courthouse in Westminster to prevent a New York judge from holding court, and two men were killed in the ensuing standoff. Ethan Allen then went to Westminster with a band of Boys and organized a convention calling for the territory's independence from New York.

When the American Revolutionary War started in 1775, Ethan Allen and a troop of his men, along with Connecticut Colonel Benedict Arnold, marched up to Lake Champlain and captured the strategically important British military posts at Fort Ticonderoga, Crown Point, and Fort George, all in New York. The Boys also briefly held St. John's in Québec, but retreated on word of arriving British regulars.

In Summer 1775, the Green Mountain Boys became the basis for the Green Mountain Rangers, a regiment in the Continental Army that selected colonel Seth Warner as its leader. Some of the Green Mountain Boys preferred to remain with Ethan Allen and were taken prisoners along with Allen in August 1775 in a bungled attempt to capture the city of Montreal. Among them were Congressman Matthew Lyon and Lieutenant Benjamin Tucker.

Vermont eventually declared itself an independent nation in January 1777, and organized a government based in Windsor. The armed forces of the Vermont Republic was based upon the Green Mountain Boys. Although Vermont initially supported the American Revolutionary War and sent troops to fight John Burgoyne's British invasion from Quebec in battles at Hubbardton and Bennington in 1777, Vermont eventually adopted a more neutral stance and became a haven for deserters from both the British and colonial armies. George Washington, who had more than sufficient difficulties with the British, brushed off Congressional demands that he subdue Vermont. During the Haldimand Affair, some members of the Green Mountain Boys became involved in secret negotiations with British officials about restoring the Crown's rule over the territory.

The Green Mountain Boys faded away after Vermont joined the United States as the 14th U.S. state in 1791, although militia and volunteers from Vermont mustered for the War of 1812, The Civil War, the Spanish–American War, and following World War I as the Vermont National Guard.

=== Notable members ===
- Ebenezer Allen – militia member (lieutenant) (Ethan Allen's cousin)
- Ethan Allen – militia leader (general)
- Ira Allen – militia leader, and the founder of the University of Vermont (Ethan Allen's brother)
- Remember Baker – militia member (captain) (Ethan Allen's cousin)
- John Fassett Jr. – Vermont Supreme Court Justice, 1778–1786, diarist who chronicled the Green Mountain Boys' 1775 expedition to Canada.
- David Fay – Vermont Supreme Court Justice, adjutant general of the Vermont Militia
- Jonas Fay – regimental surgeon and political leader of early Vermont
- Jonas Galusha – militia leader (captain), future governor of Vermont
- Joab Hoisington – militia leader, Hoisington's Rangers (major), served in the French-Indian War, and participated in the Battle for Crown Point
- Matthew Lyon – militia member (second lieutenant), and future congressman
- David Robinson – son of Captain Samuel Robinson, a founder of Bennington
- Moses Robinson – colonel in Vermont Militia during American Revolution, 2nd governor of Vermont Republic, one of the first two senators from Vermont.
- Thomas Rowley – poet, militia member, and spokesman, known as the "Bard of the Green Mountains" who "Set the Hills on Fire".
- Elishama Tozer – militia member (lieutenant)
- Seth Warner – militia leader (colonel)

== Flag ==
Replica of the 1777 flag from the Battle of Bennington

A remnant of a Green Mountain Boys flag, believed to have belonged to John Stark, is owned by the Bennington Museum. It still exists as one of the few regimental flags from the time of the American Revolution. Although Stark was at the Battle of Bennington and likely flew this flag, the battle has become more commonly associated with the Bennington flag, which is believed to be a 19th-century banner.

== Vermont National Guard ==
The Vermont Army National Guard and Vermont Air National Guard are collectively known as the Vermont National Guard or "Green Mountain Boys". Both units use the original Green Mountain Boys battle flag as their banner.

== See also ==
- Battle of Bennington
- Battle of Hubbardton
- Fort Ticonderoga
- Invasion of Canada (1775)
- Pennamite–Yankee War, a conflict between settlers from Connecticut and Pennsylvania.
- Saratoga campaign
- Army of the Republic of Texas
- Texian Army
- Texas Navy
- Nauvoo Legion
- California Republic (Bear Flaggers)
- Vermont National Guard
- List of United States militia units in the American Revolutionary War

== Notes ==
Preceded by None	Green Mountain Boys; 1764–1791	Succeeded by Vermont State Militia
