= Remember Baker =

American soldier during the Revolutionary War

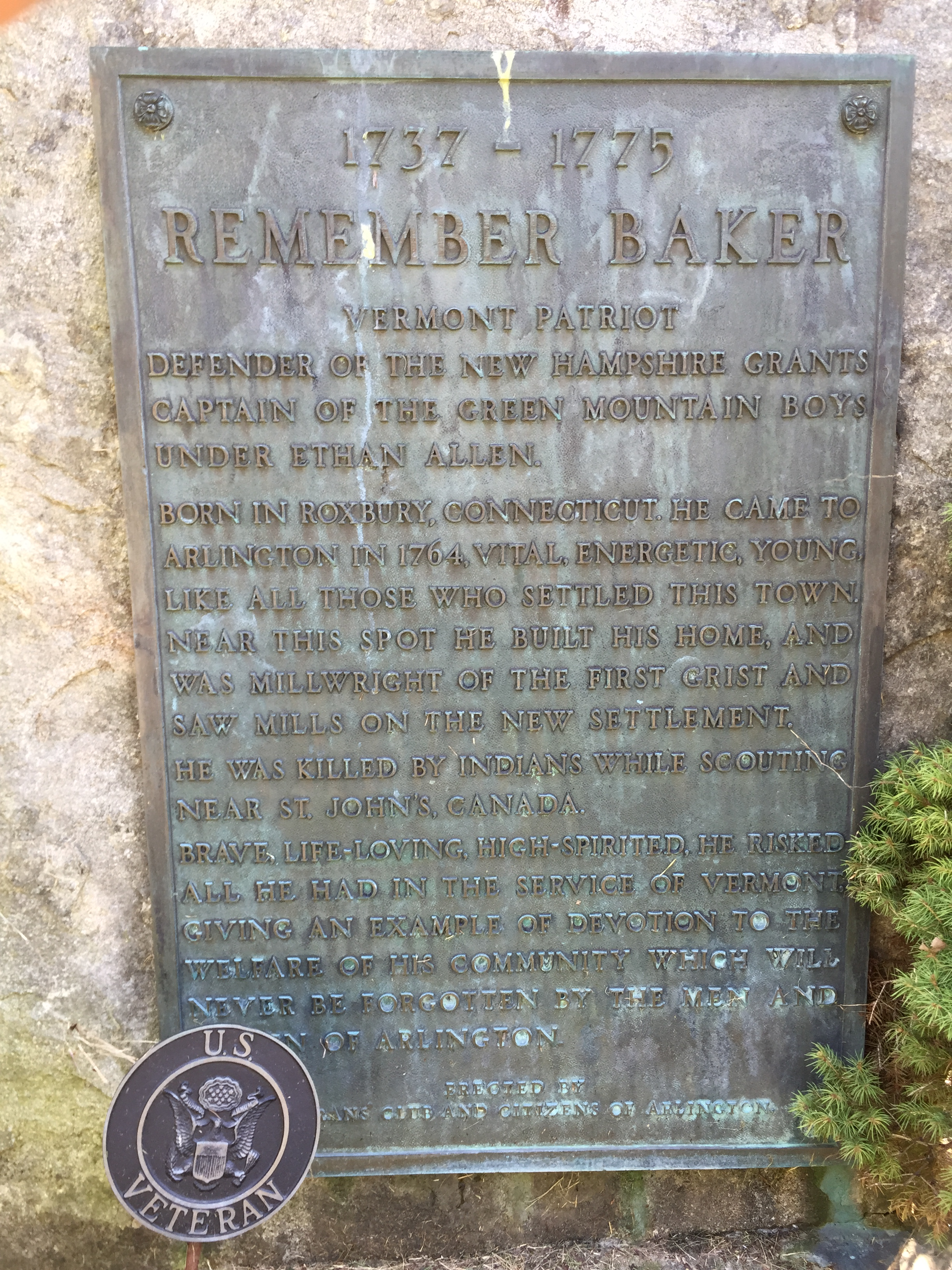
- Plaque along Old Mill Road just east of Ice Pond Road in the East Arlington section of Arlington, Vermont.
- Born: Remember Baker; June 6, 1737; Roxbury, Connecticut Colony
- Died: August 22, 1775 (aged 38); Richelieu River, Province of Quebec
- Spouse: Desire Hurlbut (m. 1760)
- Military career
- Allegiance: Vermont Republic; United States
- Branch: Continental Army
- Service years: 1755–1775
- Rank: Captain
- Unit: Green Mountain Boys
- Conflicts: American Revolutionary War

Remember Baker (June 6, 1737 – August 22, 1775) was an American soldier and a member of the Green Mountain Boys who was killed in Quebec during the early days of the American Revolutionary War.

Born in Roxbury, Connecticut (then part of Woodbury), he was the son of Remember Baker and Tamar Warner, and a first cousin of Ethan Allen, Ira Allen and Seth Warner. Remember Baker, Jr. was described by a cousin as a tough, redheaded, freckle-faced young giant. He enlisted as a private in a company of provincial troops in 1755. In 1757, he was stationed at Fort William Henry, at the head of Lake George, and during that year participated in battles which went badly for the provincial troops.

In 1758, he enlisted a second time in General James Abercrombie's attempted invasion of Canada, then held by the French. He was part of a band of 100 men under the command of Major Putnam and accompanied by Lord Howe that went on a scouting expedition. They were surprised by a party of 500 of the enemy, and Lord Howe was killed. Putnam and Baker and their men cut their way through the French ranks, charged them in the rear, and after being reinforced killed 300 of the enemy and captured 143 prisoners. Baker received honorable mention in the report of the commanding general. He remained in the service until the close of the year 1759.

Baker married Desire Hurlbut in Roxbury on April 3, 1760. In 1764, Remember, Desire, and their small son Ozi moved to Arlington, now in Vermont, and built a grist mill. This was in response to an offer of 50 acres (200,000 m^{2}) from the town to anyone who would start a mill there. The first mill burned down in 1789, but a subsequent mill built in the 1790s still stands today. Baker's cousins Ethan Allen and Ira Allen also settled in Arlington. Remember Baker was the first town clerk of Arlington.

The Bakers and the Allens were involved in the controversy over the title of the settlers of Vermont to their land, and Baker became a captain in one of the companies of the Green Mountain Boys. Remember is said to have been more hot-headed than the Allens and Seth Warner. Following attacks on those loyal to New York, the Governor of New York offered an award for the capture of Ethan Allen, Remember Baker, and others. On March 21, 1772, men from New York under the leadership of Captain John Munro attacked Baker's mill and took Baker away as a prisoner. In the fight, Baker lost a thumb and his wife injured her arm jumping out of a window. She never fully recovered the use of that arm. Remember was taken across the New York border. The Green Mountain Boys rescued Baker and returned him to his family.

By May 1773, Ira Allen and Remember Baker, as the Allen and Baker Land Co., owned some 45,000 acres (182 km^{2}) of virgin land along the Winooski River, near Burlington, Vermont. That year there were no roads north of Castleton, and Baker and Allen cut a road through the forest for 70 miles so that supplies could be brought in from Lake Champlain. In the summer, they settled on their land and built a log house across the river from Burlington. Ira Allen was unmarried and lived with the Bakers.

Remember Baker joined Ethan Allen for the capture of Fort Ticonderoga in 1775. He and Seth Warner met at Crown Point, New York, and captured the garrison there. Following that, he served as a scout for General Phillip Schuyler in the area around St. John's, where the English troops and Mohawks were camped.

Around August 19, 1775, Baker left Ticonderoga for another scouting expedition along the Richelieu River. On August 22, he was shot and killed by Mohawks who had taken his boat who were with Claude de Lorimier, interpreter and Indian Affairs. Mohawks plundered the body, cut off Baker's head, raised it upon a pole, and carried it in triumph to Fort St-Jean in Saint-Jean-sur-Richelieu, which horrified the British officers there. They bought it from the Mohawks and buried it, and also sent some men to the point to bury the body.
