= New Hampshire Grants =

Land grants in colonial New Hampshire (1749-64); later became the Republic of Vermont

Coordinates: 44°N 72.7°W

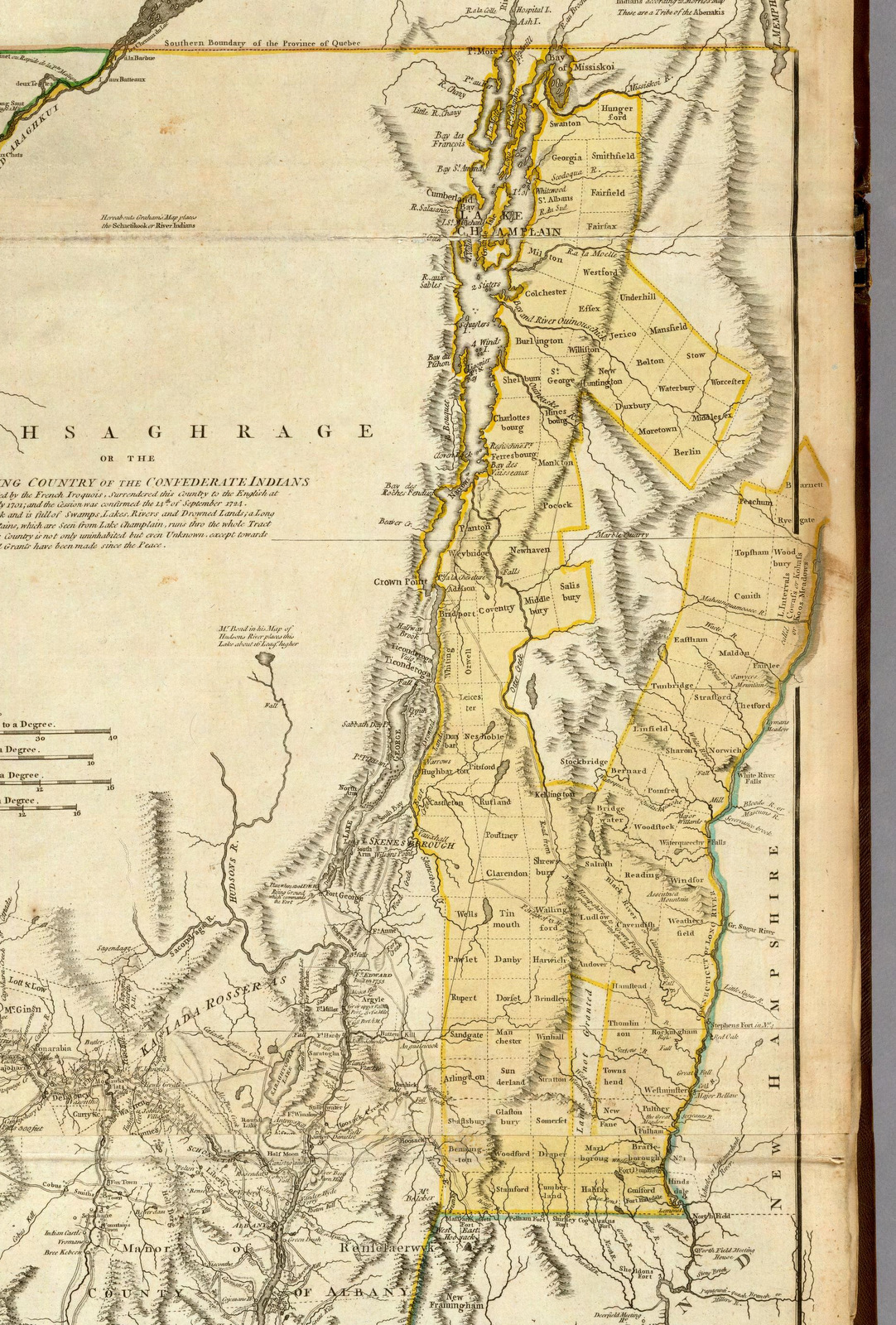
The New Hampshire Grants (yellow) on a contemporary map by Thomas Jefferys

The New Hampshire Grants or Benning Wentworth Grants were land grants made between 1749 and 1764 by the colonial governor of the Province of New Hampshire, Benning Wentworth. The land grants, totaling about 135 (including 131 towns), were made on land claimed by New Hampshire west of the Connecticut River, territory that was also claimed by the Province of New York. The resulting dispute led to the eventual establishment of the Vermont Republic, which later became the U.S. state of Vermont.

== Background ==
The territory of what is now Vermont was first permanently settled by European settlers when William Dummer, acting governor of the Province of Massachusetts Bay, ordered the construction of a fort roughly where Brattleboro is located. Massachusetts laid claim to the territory west of the Merrimack River at the time, and it had settlers on the Connecticut River who were prepared to move further north. The border between Massachusetts and the neighboring Province of New Hampshire was fixed by royal decree in 1741 at a line 3 miles (4.8 km) north of Pawtucket Falls, where the Merrimack River turns north. This decision eliminated claims by Massachusetts to the north of that line. The territory between the Connecticut River and Lake Champlain, however, was also claimed by the Province of New York, the claims of which extended eastward to the Connecticut River.

Also in 1741, New Hampshire native Benning Wentworth was appointed the first governor of New Hampshire of the 18th century who was not also a governor of Massachusetts. Wentworth chose to read New Hampshire's territorial claims broadly. He construed the decree setting the New Hampshire-Massachusetts border to mean that New Hampshire's jurisdiction extended as far west as the jurisdiction of Massachusetts extended. Since the Massachusetts boundary extended to a point 20 miles (32 km) east of the Hudson River, Wentworth assumed the area west of the Connecticut belonged to New Hampshire. New York based its claim on the letters patent, which granted Prince James, Duke of York, brother of King Charles II, all of the lands west of the Connecticut River to Delaware Bay.

== Grants ==
=== New Hampshire ===
Wentworth made the first grant, Bennington, a township west of the Connecticut River, on January 3, 1749. Cautioned by New York to cease and desist, Wentworth promised to await the judgment of the king, and refrain from making more grants in the claimed territory until it was rendered, but in November 1753, New York reported that he continued to grant land in the disputed area. Grants briefly ceased in 1754, because of the French and Indian War, but in 1755 and 1757, Wentworth had a survey made 60 miles (97 km) up the Connecticut River, and 108 grants were made, extending to the line 20 miles (32 km) east of the Hudson, and north to the eastern shore of Lake Champlain.

The grants were usually six miles square (the standard size of a U.S. survey township, i.e. 23,040 acres or 93 km^{2}) and cost the grantee(s) 20 pounds. The grants were then subdivided amongst the proprietors, and six of the lots were set aside—one for the Society for the Propagation of the Gospel in Foreign Parts (a missionary organization of the Church of England), one for the Church of England, one for the first clergyman to settle in the township, one for a school, and two for Wentworth himself. The permanent annual tax on each grant, called a quitrent, was one shilling, paid directly to the King or his representative.

=== New York ===
While Wentworth's land sales were underway, New York also issued land patents in the same area. However, in contrast to the New Hampshire grants, the New York patents were generally irregularly shaped and issued to wealthy landowners. The New Hampshire grants were "town-sized," and generally settled by middle-class farmers. Most of the New York boundaries were ignored in favor of the New Hampshire boundaries and designations once Vermont achieved statehood, and some of these New York patents are now referred to as paper towns because they existed only on paper.

== Royal adjudication ==
In September 1762, New York found New Hampshire surveyors working on the east side of Champlain, provoking the former colony's government to reiterate its claim to the area, citing both its own patent and the New Hampshire letters patent of 1741. In March 1764, Wentworth released a statement to the effect that the resolution of jurisdictional dispute required a royal verdict, which he was certain would be made in his favor. Meanwhile, he encouraged his grantees to settle in the land and to cultivate and develop it.

New York appealed to the Board of Trade, requesting a confirmation of their original grant, which finally resolved the border dispute between New York and New Hampshire in favor of New York. The royal order of July 26, 1764, affirmed that "the Western bank of the Connecticut, from where it enters the province of Massachusetts Bay as far north as the 45th degree of northern latitude, to be the boundary line between the said two provinces of New Hampshire and New York." Wentworth issued his final two grants on October 17 of that year: Walker and Waltham.

== Invalidation ==
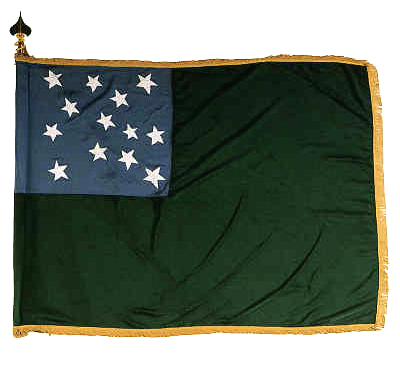
Flag of the Green Mountain Boys

New York interpreted the decision as invalidating Wentworth's grants entirely—to the great dismay of area residents—and subsequently divided the territory into four counties, Albany, Charlotte, Cumberland and Gloucester. New York required that grantees surrender their charters, and in many cases buy their lands back from New York at greatly increased prices. Those who would not pay lost legal title to their lands, which New York then reassigned to others. The people, who would later become Vermonters, petitioned the governor of New York to confirm the New Hampshire Grants; he complied, in part, by declaring that no other grants should be made until the King's wishes were known. Land not previously granted by New Hampshire was considered open for distribution by New York's government.

In 1770, the New York Supreme Court declared all of Wentworth's grants invalid, thereby asserting the province's de jure control over the region. This infuriated residents, including Ethan Allen and his Green Mountain Boys, who rose up to resist those efforts. While the resistance faded, so did New York's desire to assert its claim on the land around the Upper Connecticut, as a more pressing issue—revolution—moved to center stage.

== Independence and statehood ==
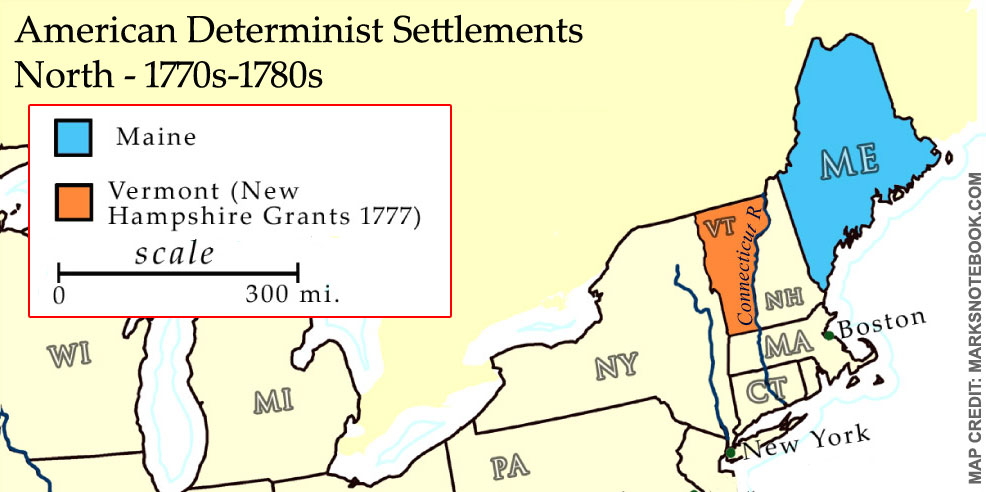
The New Hampshire Grants region petitioned the Continental Congress for entry into the American union as a state independent of New York in 1776.

In January 1775 Committees of Safety from over twenty towns in the New Hampshire Grants area met in Manchester to discuss the need for local self-governance independent from New York. The Manchester meeting created a "civil and political Body" to regulate their community. Two months later, another convention meeting at Westminster renounced the authority of New York's government. On March 13, 1775, two men were killed in Westminster by officers from New York. News of the first clash between American militia and British troops at Lexington and Concord interrupted the Westminster convention, but settlers gathered at yet another convention at Dorset in 1776 and petitioned the Continental Congress to recognize Vermont as a state and seat its delegates. The New York delegation convinced the Congress to deny the petition.

Some former Green Mountain Boys companies served in the American Revolutionary War, including in the effort to capture Fort Ticonderoga on May 10, 1775, and the invasion of Canada later that year. Ethan Allen and his then subordinate, Seth Warner, induced the Continental Congress at Philadelphia to create a Green Mountain ranger regiment. Having no treasury, the Congress directed that New York's Provincial Congress pay for the newly authorized regiment; which it did.

In 1777 the citizens of Vermont declared their full independence from Great Britain and established a constitution. The first elections under this constitution were held on March 3, 1778, and on March 12, the new government was organized at Windsor.

During the later stages of the Revolutionary War (early 1780s) several Vermont officials engaged in negotiations with British officials, including Frederick Haldimand, the governor of Quebec, about Vermont officially returning to the British side. Just as Haldimand offered generous terms for reunion in 1781, the main British army surrendered at Yorktown, and it was clear that the United States would achieve independence.

Following the Revolutionary War, Vermont was excluded (primarily due to objections from New York) from the loose confederation established among the 13 former colonies. The state remained outside until 1791. In 1790 New York finally consented to Vermont's admission to the Union. New York ceded its New Hampshire Grants claim to Vermont for 30,000 dollars. A convention was held from January 6 through 10, 1791 at Bennington to consider joining the federal Union. The convention voted 105–2 in favor of seeking admission. Congress gave unanimous approval to Vermont statehood the following month, and on March 4, 1791, the New Hampshire Grants, as Vermont, became the 14th state, the first admitted to the Union after adoption of the federal Constitution.

== See also ==
- List of towns in Vermont
- Equivalent Lands
- Gloucester County, New York
- Cumberland County, New York

== Sources ==
- Robinson, Rowland (1892). Vermont: A Study of Independence. Cambridge, Massachusetts: Houghton Mifflin Company (American Commonwealths Series).
- Thompson, Charles Miner (1942). Independent Vermont. Boston: Houghton Mifflin Company.
- Van de Water, Frederic (1941). The Reluctant Republic: Vermont 1724–1791. New York: The John Day Company.
