= Jonas Fay =

American judge (1737–1818)

Judge of the Vermont Probate Court for the Bennington District
- In office 1782–1787
- Preceded by: Nathaniel Brush
- Succeeded by: Nathaniel Brush

Associate Justice of the Vermont Supreme Court
- In office 1781–1782
- Preceded by: John Throop
- Succeeded by: Thomas Porter

Member of the Vermont Governor's Council
- In office 1778–1785
- Preceded by: None (position created)
- Succeeded by: Nathaniel Niles

Personal details
- Born: January 17, 1737 Hardwick, Massachusetts, British America
- Died: March 6, 1818 (aged 81) Bennington, Vermont, United States
- Resting place: Old Bennington Cemetery, Bennington, Vermont
- Spouse(s): Sarah Fassett (m. 1760); Lydia Warner Safford (m. 1777)
- Children: 8
- Relatives: Joseph Fay (brother); David Fay (brother); Moses Robinson (brother in law)
- Profession: Physician

Jonas Fay (January 17, 1737 – March 6, 1818) was a military and political leader of Vermont during its period as an independent republic, and during the early years of its statehood. Born in Massachusetts, he served in the militia during the French and Indian War, studied medicine, and became a physician. His father moved to Vermont during its formative years, and Jonas Fay moved with him. Fay was active in the Green Mountain Boys and their resistance to New York's efforts to assume jurisdiction over Vermont. In 1775, he served as a physician for the contingent of Green Mountain Boys that captured Fort Ticonderoga.

Fay served as secretary of the 1777 constitutional convention at which Vermont declared its independence and was a primary author of the declaration by which Vermont announced this decision. He served as Vice President of the Council of Safety that administered Vermont at the start of the American Revolution, and as a member of the Governor's Council after the Governor and Council replaced the Committee of Safety. He also visited the Continental Congress as an agent of Vermont, and attempted unsuccessfully to persuade Congress to allow Vermont to join the Union. Fay was also one of eight Vermont founders originally aware of the details of the Haldimand negotiations, in which British authorities worked to make Vermont a British Province. After the war, Fay served as a justice of the Vermont Supreme Court, and Judge of the Probate Court for Bennington County. He died in Bennington in 1818, and was buried at Old Bennington Cemetery.

== Early life ==
Jonas Fay was born in Hardwick, Massachusetts on January 17, 1737, the son of Stephen Fay and Ruth Child. He took part in the French and Indian War as clerk of Samuel Robinson's company of Massachusetts provincial troops, including expeditions against the French Army at Fort Edward and Fort George, New York. He later trained as a cordwainer, taught school, and was appointed as an ensign in the militia.

== Move to Vermont ==
Fay was subsequently educated as a physician, and when Stephen Fay moved to Bennington, Vermont in 1766, Jonas Fay joined him and began a medical practice. During Vermont's early years, New Hampshire's colonial governor claimed jurisdiction, and sold land grants to prospective settlers and land speculators. New York later claimed jurisdiction, and its position was upheld by the British government. When New York tried to make holders of New Hampshire grants purchase confirming titles, those who had purchased their grants from New Hampshire refused to pay twice for the same land, and formed a militia to resist collection efforts and eviction by New York. This militia, the Green Mountain Boys, interceded to stop New York sheriffs who attempted to eject holders of New Hampshire land grants, and punished holders of New Hampshire grants who were willing to purchase confirmatory titles from New York. Stephen Fay was the proprietor of Bennington's Catamount Tavern, where the Green Mountain Boys frequently met to share news and plan their activities, and he became an active member. Fay's sons also joined the Green Mountain Boys, including Jonas.

In 1772, Governor William Tryon of New York invited the residents of Vermont to visit him in New York City and formally present their objections to purchasing confirmatory titles, with the goal of agreeing to a compromise. The residents of Vermont chose Stephen and Jonas Fay to prepare their written reply and negotiate on their behalf; the negotiations proved unsuccessful.

In 1774, New York's government declared the leaders of the Green Mountain Boys to be outlaws subject to arrest or death, including Ethan Allen and Seth Warner; Fay was the secretary of the Vermont convention which resolved to defend them by force, and was responsible for preparing and publishing the convention proceedings as a defense of Vermont's position.

== American Revolution ==
After the American Revolution commenced in April 1775, Ethan Allen began to plan an attack on the British-held Fort Ticonderoga, which was opposite Vermont on the New York side of Lake Champlain, and had major strategic value because it controlled the likely invasion routes from the British dominion of Canada into New York's interior. When a contingent of Green Mountain Boys under Allen carried out the attack in May, Fay served as their surgeon. The attack was a success, and Fay was among the Green Mountain Boys who continued to occupy the fort after it was captured. Fay was also surgeon of the regiment Seth Warner led during a Continental Army expedition to Canada in the fall of 1775.

In January 1776, Fay was clerk of the convention in Dorset, Vermont, which unsuccessfully petitioned the Continental Congress to allow Vermont to join the Revolution as an independent entity, not under the jurisdiction of New Hampshire or New York; the governments of New Hampshire and New York both objected, and Congress refused Vermont's petition rather than risk losing their support. In January 1777, Fay was a delegate to the 1777 constitutional convention in Windsor, which declared Vermont to be a republic separate from both New Hampshire and New York; he was appointed chairman of the committee named to draft the declaration announcing the creation of the independent Vermont Republic, and was credited as its primary author. Fay was also a participant in the 1777 Battle of Bennington; he administered aid to wounded patriots, including his brother John, who was killed during the fighting.

After the creation of the Republic of Vermont, Fay served on the Council of Safety that administered its government until the election of a governor and executive council. When the new government was elected, Fay was chosen as one of the council members, and he served from 1778 to 1785. He continued as one of Vermont's agents authorized to negotiate with the Continental Congress on the question of admitting Vermont to the Union; he presented petitions in 1779, 1781, and 1782. The Continental Congress continued to decline Vermont's request for fear of alienating New Hampshire and New York, but did find compromises which allowed Vermont to aid in the war effort.

== Role in Haldimand negotiations ==
Fay was one of a small number of Vermonters, including Thomas Chittenden, Ethan Allen, Ira Allen, and Joseph Fay, who were privy to the details of the Haldimand negotiations. In 1780 and 1781, Frederick Haldimand, the British governor of Quebec, exchanged surreptitious proposals with Chittenden and others which broached the possibility that Vermont would end its Revolutionary War activities and become a British province. Historians continue to debate the actual intent of the Vermonters who took part; one school of thought considers it likely that they were willing to make a Vermont a British province if their land grants were protected. Another believes that Chittenden and other Vermont leaders were attempting to prevent a British invasion of Vermont from Canada by pretending to negotiate. In addition, this school of thought includes the possibility that Vermont's leaders hoped to use the negotiations as leverage with the Continental Congress, and make it more likely that Congress would admit Vermont to the Union. Whatever the intent, once the Siege of Yorktown concluded with a British surrender, it became apparent to Haldimand that Vermont would not become a British province, and the negotiations ended.

== Post-Revolution ==
Fay served as a justice of the Vermont Supreme Court from 1781 to 1782, and as Judge of the Probate Court in Bennington County's from 1782 to 1787. He continued to practice medicine in Bennington, and lived for short periods in Charlotte and Pawlet before returning to Bennington.

== Death and burial ==
Fay died in Bennington on March 6, 1818, and was buried at Old Bennington Cemetery.

== Family ==
=== Siblings ===
Fay had several brothers and sisters, to include:

- John (1734-1777)
- Stephen(1739-1804)
- Ruth (1741-1757)
- Mary (1743-1801)
- Beulah (1745-1833)
- Elijah (1748-1835)
- Benjamin (1750-1786)
- Joseph (1753-1803)
- Sarah (1757-1801)
- David (1761-1827)

Jonas Fay and several of his brothers took part in the Battle of Bennington, at which John was killed.

Mary was the wife of Moses Robinson, who served as Governor and United States Senator.

Beulah was the wife of Samuel Billings, a Revolutionary War veteran and militia officer who attained the rank of major before dying in 1789.

Joseph Fay was a militia officer and politician who served as Secretary of State of Vermont.

Sarah was the wife of David Robinson, the brother of Moses Robinson. David Robinson was a major general in the Vermont Militia, the longtime sheriff of Bennington County, and the United States Marshal for the District of Vermont.

David Fay was a militia officer and politician who served as state adjutant general and a justice of the Vermont Supreme Court.

=== First wife and children ===
Jonas Fay was married twice. His first wife was Sarah Fassett Fay, whom he married in 1760. They were the parents of five children, and she died circa 1775.

- Josiah (1761-?)
- Ruth (1763-1860), the wife of Alexander Brush.
- Polly (1764-1815), the wife of Bildad Hubbell.
- Sarah Fay (1767-1820), the wife of Henry Hopkins.
- Susannah "Sukey" Fay (c. 1771-1863), the wife of John Fay.

=== Second wife and children ===
His second wife was Lydia Warner Safford Fay (1740-1828); they were married in 1777.

With her first husband, Challis Safford (d. 1771), Lydia Warner was the mother of:

- Anna Safford (b. 1761)
- Jonas Safford (b. 1763)
- Jonathan Safford (b. 1766)
- Robert Safford (b. 1768)
- Challis Safford (b. 1771)

Jonas Fay and Lydia Warner were the parents of three children:

- Ethan Allen Fay (twin) (1779-1859). He owned a hotel in Charlotte, Vermont, and later resided in Fort Ann, New York, where he served in local offices including village president.
- Heman Allen Fay (twin), (1779-1865). He graduated from the United States Military Academy in 1808, served in the army during the War of 1812, and later served as keeper of military stores in Albany.
- Lydia Fay (1781-1838), the wife of Uriah Edgerton.

== Sources ==
=== Books ===
- Crockett, Walter Hill (1921). Vermont: The Green Mountain State. Vol. 1. New York, NY: Century History Company. ISBN 9780788448034.
- Hemenway, Abby Maria (1867). The Vermont Historical Gazetteer. Vol. 1. Burlington, VT: A. M. Hemenway.
- Lossing, Benson J. (1851). The Pictorial Field-book of the Revolution. Vol. 1. New York, NY: Harper & Brothers.
- Marshall, Benjamin Tinkham (1922). A Modern History of New London County, Connecticut. Vol. 2. New York, NY: Lewis Historical Publishing Company.
- Stone, William L. (1901). Washington County, New York: Its History to the Close of the Nineteenth Century. New York, NY: New York History Co.
- Ullery, Jacob G. (1894). Men of Vermont Illustrated. Brattleboro, VT: Transcript Publishing Company. p. 50.
- Warner, Lucien C.; Nichols, Josephine Genung (1919). The Descendants of Andrew Warner. New Haven, CT: Tuttle, Morehouse and Taylor Co. p. 166.
- Watt, Gavin K. (2010-06-21). I Am Heartily Ashamed. Vol. II: The Revolutionary War's Final Campaign as Waged from Canada in 1782. Toronto, Canada: Dundurn Press. ISBN 978-1-55488-715-6.
- White, James Terry (1967). The National Cyclopedia of American Biography. New York, NY: J. T. White.

=== Magazines ===
- Clough, Ovando D. (January 1, 1908). ""The War of the Grants", Or Along the Political Highway of Vermont". The Vermonter. White River Junction, VT: Chas. R. Cummings.

=== Internet ===
- "Ethan A. Fay in the New York U.S. Census Mortality Schedules, 1850-1880". Ancestry.com. Provo, UT: Ancestry.com LLC.
- "Heman A. Fay in the Albany Rural Cemetery Burial Cards, 1791-2011". Ancestry.com. Provo, UT: Ancestry.com LLC.
- "Death Record for Lydia F. Edgerton in Vermont Vital Records, 1720-1908". Ancestry.com. Provo, UT: Ancestry.com LLC.
- "Death Record for Sarah Fay Robinson in Vermont Vital Records, 1720-1908". Ancestry.com. Provo, UT: Ancestry.com LLC.
- "Information Taken from the Bible Owned by Landlord Stephen Fay of the Catamount Tavern (Courtesy of Mr. Mrs. Elmer Johnson)". Ancestry.com. Provo, UT: Ancestry.com LLC.
- "Stephen Fay (1715-1781) of Bennington, Vermont and his Descendants". The Fay Family Homepage. Provo, UT: Rootsweb, An Ancestry.com Community.
- Procknow, Gene (November 5, 2013). "Ethan Allen: Patriot, Land Promoter or Turncoat?". Journal of the American Revolution. Naperville, IL: All Things Liberty.

=== Newspapers ===
- "The Old Bennington First Congregational Church". Bennington Banner. Bennington, VT. August 11, 1977.

=== Encyclopedias ===
- Duffy, John J.; Hand, Samuel B.; Orth, Ralph H. (2003). "Fay, Jonas". The Vermont Encyclopedia. Hanover, NH: University Press of New England. ISBN 978-1-58465-086-7.

== External resources ==
- Jonas Fay at Find a Grave
- "Today in Masonic History: Jonas Fay is Born". MasonryToday.com.
