= Roswell Hopkins =

American politician

Town Supervisor of Hopkinton, New York
- In office 1811–1819
- Preceded by: Benjamin W. Hopkins
- Succeeded by: Thaddeus Laughlin
- In office 1809–1810
- Preceded by: Henry McLaughlin
- Succeeded by: Benjamin W. Hopkins
- In office 1806–1807
- Preceded by: None (position created)
- Succeeded by: Benjamin W. Hopkins

Member of the New York State Assembly
- In office 1810–1813
- Preceded by: Alexander Richards
- Succeeded by: Louis Hasbrouck
- Constituency: St. Lawrence

Town Clerk of Hopkinton, New York
- In office 1807–1808
- Preceded by: Henry McLaughlin
- Succeeded by: Benjamin W. Hopkins

Secretary of State of Vermont
- In office 1788–1802
- Governor: Thomas Chittenden; Paul Brigham; Isaac Tichenor
- Preceded by: Micah Townshend
- Succeeded by: David Wing Jr.

Personal details
- Born: May 17, 1757 Amenia, New York, British Colonial America
- Died: September 5, 1829 (aged 72) Chazy, New York, U.S.
- Resting place: Hopkinton Fort Jackson Cemetery, Hopkinton, New York, U.S.
- Party: Federalist (from 1791)
- Spouse(s): Lydia Dewey (m. 1780); Mary Armstrong (m. 1829)
- Children: 7
- Occupation: Farmer; Businessman

Roswell Hopkins (May 17, 1757 – September 5, 1829) was a farmer, businessman, and government official in Vermont and New York. He served as Secretary of State of Vermont from 1788 to 1802, and was the founder of the town of Hopkinton, New York.

== Biography ==
Roswell Hopkins was born in Amenia, New York on May 17, 1757, the son of Roswell Hopkins (1733–1829), and Mary Cook Hopkins (1736–1803).

The younger Hopkins worked on his father's farm, and his father relocated to Bennington, Vermont in the 1770s. The younger Hopkins gave up farming after an injury, studied medicine with Dr. Jonas Fay, and became a physician. He served as a surgeon in the militia during the American Revolution, and took part in the Battle of Bennington and the Battles of Saratoga. Hopkins later went to sea as surgeon's mate aboard a privateer, the New Broom. In October, 1778, the New Broom was captured by the British, and Hopkins was briefly held as a prisoner in Newport, Rhode Island; he was quickly exchanged, after which he returned to Bennington.

Hopkins soon became involved in Vermont's government; from 1778 to 1781 he was register of the probate court in Bennington County. From 1779 to 1788 he was Clerk of the Vermont House of Representatives.

In 1786, Hopkins moved to Vergennes; he was selected to serve as clerk of the court in Addison County, and he held this position until 1801. He affiliated with the Federalist Party when it was formed; Hopkins became Vermont's Secretary of State on October 10, 1788, and served until he resigned on October 15, 1802.

Hopkins received a land grant from Vermont's government in lieu of a salary; this grant of more than 11,000 acres in Caledonia County was conveyed to him in 1790. Hopkins called the town granted to him "Hopkinsville"; this parcel was subsequently combined with a 2,500-acre parcel from the town of Burke, and later renamed Kirby. By the time the town was organized in 1807, Hopkins had sold his interest and was no longer living in Vermont.

In 1801, Hopkins relocated to St. Lawrence County, New York, and founded the town of Hopkinton. In addition to farming, Hopkins remained active in government; He served as Hopkinton's town supervisor in 1806, 1810, and 1811 to 1819. He was town clerk in 1807, a justice of the peace from 1805 to 1808, and judge of the court of common pleas from 1810 to 1812. From 1810 to 1813 he was a member of the New York State Assembly.

Hopkins also had several civic and business interests; he was a member of the board of directors of the Lansingburgh Bank, and a member of the board of trustees of the St. Lawrence Academy in Potsdam. He was also an active Freemason, and was a founder of the North Star Lodge in Brushton. In addition, he served in several leadership positions with the Grand Lodge of New York, including four years as Grand Secretary.

== Death and burial ==
Hopkins was traveling to Vermont to visit a family member when he was thrown from his carriage in Chazy, New York. He died in Chazy on September 5, 1829. Hopkins was buried at Hopkinton Fort Jackson Cemetery in Hopkinton.

== Family ==
In 1780, Hopkins married Lydia Dewey (1761–1816). In 1829, he married Mary Armstrong (1767–1850).

With his first wife, Hopkins had seven children who lived to adulthood:

- Roswell Dewey (1781–1862), who married first Mary Strong, and later Sarah Ferris.
- Benjamin Wait (1783–1819), the husband of Harriet Woodbridge.
- Maria C. (1785–1847), the wife of Artemus Sawyer.
- Isaac Roswell (1788–1853), who married Sophia Woodbridge.
- George (1791–1820), the husband of Harriet E. Newcomb.
- Sarah "Sally" (1796–1842), the wife of Sewall Raymond.
- James Gillingham (1801–1861), who married Elizabeth Rosseel.

== Sources ==
- Fox, Dixon Ryan (1919). The Decline of Aristocracy in the Politics of New York. New York, NY: Columbia University. p. 53.
- Huse, Hiram Augustus (1895). The New Hampshire Grants. Vol. XXVI, Town Charters Volume III. Concord, NH: Edward N. Pearson. p. 671.
- Grand Lodge of Vermont (1879). Records of the Grand Lodge of Free and Accepted Masons of the State of Vermont, 1794–1846. Burlington, VT: Free Press Association. pp. 32–34.
- Sanford, Carlton Elisha (1903). Early History of the Town of Hopkinton. Boston, MA: Bartlett Press. p. 404.
- Werner, Edgar (1889). The New-York Civil List. Albany, NY: Weed, Parson & Co. pp. 422–424.

Political offices
Preceded by Micah Townshend	Secretary of State of Vermont; 1788 – 1802	Succeeded by David Wing Jr.
