= Freeman's oath =

Freeman's oath may refer to:

- Voter's oath or affirmation, sworn by persons registering to vote for the first time in Vermont
- Oath of a Freeman, required of free immigrants to the Massachusetts Bay colony
- The Freeman's Oath, a 1639 broadsheet printed by British North American Stephen Daye

== See also ==
- Loyalty oath
