= David Fay =

American judge

Member of the Vermont Governor's Council
- In office 1817–1821
- Preceded by: Josiah Wright
- Succeeded by: Josiah Pratt

Associate Justice of the Vermont Supreme Court
- In office 1809–1813 Serving with Theophilus Harrington, Royall Tyler
- Preceded by: Jonas Galusha
- Succeeded by: Nathaniel Chipman, Daniel Farrand, Jonathan Hatch Hubbard

United States Attorney for Vermont
- In office 1801–1809
- Preceded by: Charles Marsh
- Succeeded by: Cornelius P. Van Ness

State's Attorney of Bennington County, Vermont
- In office 1800–1801
- Preceded by: Truman Squier
- Succeeded by: Richard Skinner
- In office 1795–1798
- Preceded by: Joshua Hathaway
- Succeeded by: Truman Squier

Personal details
- Born: December 13, 1761 Hardwick, Massachusetts
- Died: June 5, 1827 (aged 65) Bennington, Vermont
- Resting place: Old Bennington Cemetery, Bennington, Vermont
- Party: Democratic-Republican
- Spouse: Mary (Staniford) Fay (m. 1801)
- Relations: Joseph Fay (brother)
- Profession: Attorney

Military service
- Allegiance: United States; Vermont
- Service: Vermont Militia
- Years of service: 1777–1822
- Rank: Major General
- Commands: Adjutant General of the Vermont Militia
- Wars: American Revolutionary War; War of 1812

David Fay (December 13, 1761 – June 5, 1827) was a Vermont judge and militia officer who served on the Vermont Supreme Court and as Adjutant General of the Vermont Militia.

== Early life ==
David Fay was born in Hardwick, Massachusetts, on December 13, 1761. His father Stephen Fay, owner of Bennington's Catamount Tavern and one of the founders of Vermont, relocated the family to Bennington in 1766. David Fay served in the Vermont Militia as a fifer during the American Revolution, and took part in the Battle of Bennington as a member of Captain Samuel Robinson's Company. His brother Joseph Fay also served in the Green Mountain Boys and took part in the Battle of Bennington, and later served as Secretary of State of Vermont. His brother Jonas Fay was also a member of the Green Mountain Boys, and served in several government positions during Vermont's early years, including Justice of the Vermont Supreme Court.

== Career ==
Fay was a farmer and surveyor. He later studied law, and attained admission to the bar in 1794.

A Democratic-Republican, he served as Bennington County State's attorney from 1795 to 1798, and again from 1800 to 1801. and was a member of the state Council of Censors in 1799 and 1806. From 1801 to 1809 Fay served as United States Attorney for Vermont.

In 1809 Fay was appointed to the Vermont Supreme Court, and he served until 1813.

From 1817 to 1821 he was a member of the Vermont Governor's Council, and he served as Bennington County's Judge of Probate from 1819 to 1820.

== Military service ==
Following the Revolution, Fay continued his service in the militia. He attained the rank of major in the early 1790s and was a colonel by the late 1790s. In 1795 he was appointed Adjutant General of the Vermont Militia with the rank of major general. He held this position until 1822.

During the War of 1812 Fay coordinated the activities of the Vermont Militia, including units dispatched to provide security on the Vermont-Canada border and units which took part in the defense of Plattsburgh.

== Death and burial ==
Fay died in Bennington on June 5, 1827, and was buried in the Old Bennington Cemetery.

Military offices
Preceded by None	Vermont Adjutant General; 1799–1822	Succeeded by Daniel Kellogg
Legal offices
Preceded by Charles Marsh	United States Attorney for the District of Vermont; 1801-1809	Succeeded by Cornelius P. Van Ness
