= Thomas Chandler Jr. =

American politician from Vermont

Thomas Chandler Jr. (September 23, 1740 (O.S.) – 1798) was a Vermont colonial leader who was a founder of Chester, Vermont and served as Speaker of the Vermont House of Representatives. In addition, he was Vermont's first Secretary of State.

== Biography ==
The son of Elizabeth (Elliot) Chandler and Thomas Chandler, another of Chester's original proprietors, the younger Chandler was born in Woodstock, Connecticut on September 23, 1740 (Old Style).

The younger Chandler was chosen Chester's Town Clerk at a 1763 meeting of the founders, which took place in Worcester, Massachusetts. He continued in this office until 1765, and served as Town Clerk again from 1777 to 1779.

From 1766 to 1775 Chandler served as a Judge of the Court of Common Pleas and a Justice of the Peace, holding office under the auspices of New York during the disputes between holders of land titles from New Hampshire and New York's government over who had jurisdiction in Vermont. Chandler resigned his offices following the Westminster massacre, opting to side with those who opposed New York's claims. During the American Revolution he served as a Judge of the Superior Court and as one of Vermont's Sequestration Commissioners, responsible for disposing of the estates of Loyalists and Yorkers and turning the proceeds over to Vermont's government.

Chandler served in the militia, and attained the rank of major.

In 1778 Chandler was elected to the Vermont House of Representatives, serving until 1781. In March, 1778 he was elected Clerk of the House and was also named Secretary of State, the first individual to hold this position.

Chandler was elected Speaker of the House in October, 1778 and served until 1780. He also served as a member of the Governor's Council from 1779 to 1780. In 1778 and 1779 he served as a justice of the Vermont Supreme Court.

In 1787 Chandler returned to the Vermont House of Representatives and served one term.

In the early 1790s extended illnesses among several Chandler family members caused Thomas Chandler Jr. financial difficulties and he successfully petitioned the state legislature for an Act of Insolvency.

Chandler died in Chester in 1798.

Political offices
| Preceded by Office created | Secretary of State of Vermont; 1778 – 1778 | Succeeded by Joseph Fay |
| Preceded by Nathan Clark | Speaker of the Vermont House of Representatives; 1778 – 1780 | Succeeded by Samuel Robinson |
