= Micah Townsend =

American politician

Micah Townshend

Secretary of State of Vermont
- In office 1781–1788
- Preceded by: Joseph Fay
- Succeeded by: Roswell Hopkins

Probate Judge of Vermont's Marlboro district
- In office 1781–1789
- Preceded by: None (position created)
- Succeeded by: John Bridgman

Clerk of Windham County, Vermont
- In office 1781–1791
- Preceded by: None (position created)
- Succeeded by: Calvin Knowlton

Personal details
- Born: May 13, 1749 Oyster Bay, New York, U.S.
- Died: April 23, 1832 (aged 82) Clarenceville, Quebec, Canada
- Resting place: Saint George's Anglican Cemetery, Clarenceville, Quebec, Canada
- Spouse: Mary Wells (1778–1831, her death)
- Children: 8
- Education: College of New Jersey (now Princeton University)
- Profession: Attorney

Military service
- Allegiance: United States; New York
- Service: New York Militia
- Years of service: 1776
- Rank: Captain
- Commands: Townsend's Rangers
- Wars: American Revolution

Micah Townsend (May 13, 1749 – April 23, 1832) was an attorney and political leader in Revolutionary War-era Vermont. The offices he served in included Secretary of State of Vermont.

== Biography ==
Townsend was born in Oyster Bay, New York on May 13, 1749. The son of Micajah Townsend and Elizabeth Platt, he graduated from the College of New Jersey (now Princeton University) in 1766, and received a master's degree in 1769. Townsend studied law with Thomas Jones of New York City, was admitted to the bar, and began a practice in White Plains. He was appointed secretary of Westchester County's Committee of Safety, and in June 1776 he was commissioned as a captain and appointed to command a company, Townsend's Rangers, in the New York militia. He served until November 1776, when his company was disbanded.

After his militia service, Townsend relocated to Brattleboro, Vermont. Initially a supporter of New York's government in its ongoing dispute with local residents concerning jurisdiction over Vermont, Townsend later became a supporter of the Vermont government's claims. From 1781 to 1789 he was judge and register of probate for Windham County's Marlboro district. From 1781 to 1788, Townsend served as Vermont's Secretary of State. From 1781 to 1791, he was clerk of Windham County. After resigning his offices, Townsend continued to practice law in Brattleboro.

In 1801, Townsend sold his Brattleboro home and land to Royall Tyler, and moved to Guilford. In 1802, he moved again, this time to Farnham, Quebec, Canada. He farmed and practiced law, and continued to reside in Farnham until 1816, when he moved to Clarenceville. In Clarenceville, Townsend resided with his son, the Reverend Micajah Townsend. Though he had intended to retire, after moving to Canada Townsend was persuaded by the community to accept appointments as justice of the peace and small claims judge, which he carried out until well into his seventies.

Townsend died in Clarenceville on April 23, 1832. He was buried at Saint George's Anglican Cemetery in Clarenceville.

== Family ==
In 1778, Townsend married Mary Wells (1760–1831). They were the parents of eight children, including: Harriet Matilda (1779–1848); Samuel Wells (1781–1817); Epenetus (1783–1839); Rebecca Gale (1784–1830); Mary (1786–1839); Micajah (1789–1871); and Sarah Barnard (1800–1844).

== Sources ==
=== Books ===
- Cabot, Mary Rogers (1921). Annals of Brattleboro, 1681-1895. Vol. I. Brattleboro, VT: E. L. Hildreth & Co. p. 148 – via Google Books.
- Child, Hamilton (1884). Gazetteer and Business Directory of Windham County, Vt., 1724-1884. Syracuse, NY: Syracuse Journal – via Google Books.
- Day, Mrs. C. M. (1869). History of the Eastern Townships, Province of Quebec, Dominion of Canada. Montreal, Quebec: John Novell. p. 276.
- Stoutenburgh, Henry Augustus (1904). A Documentary History of the Dutch Congregation of Oyster Bay. New York, NY: Knickerbocker Press. p. 551 – via Google Books.
- Walton, E. P. (1873). Records of the Governor and Council of the State of Vermont. Vol. I. Montpelier, VT: J. and J. M. Poland. pp. 518–519.

Political offices
Preceded by Joseph Fay	Secretary of State of Vermont; 1781–1788	Succeeded by Roswell Hopkins
