= History of slavery in Vermont =

History of slavery in early Vermont

- 1777–1791
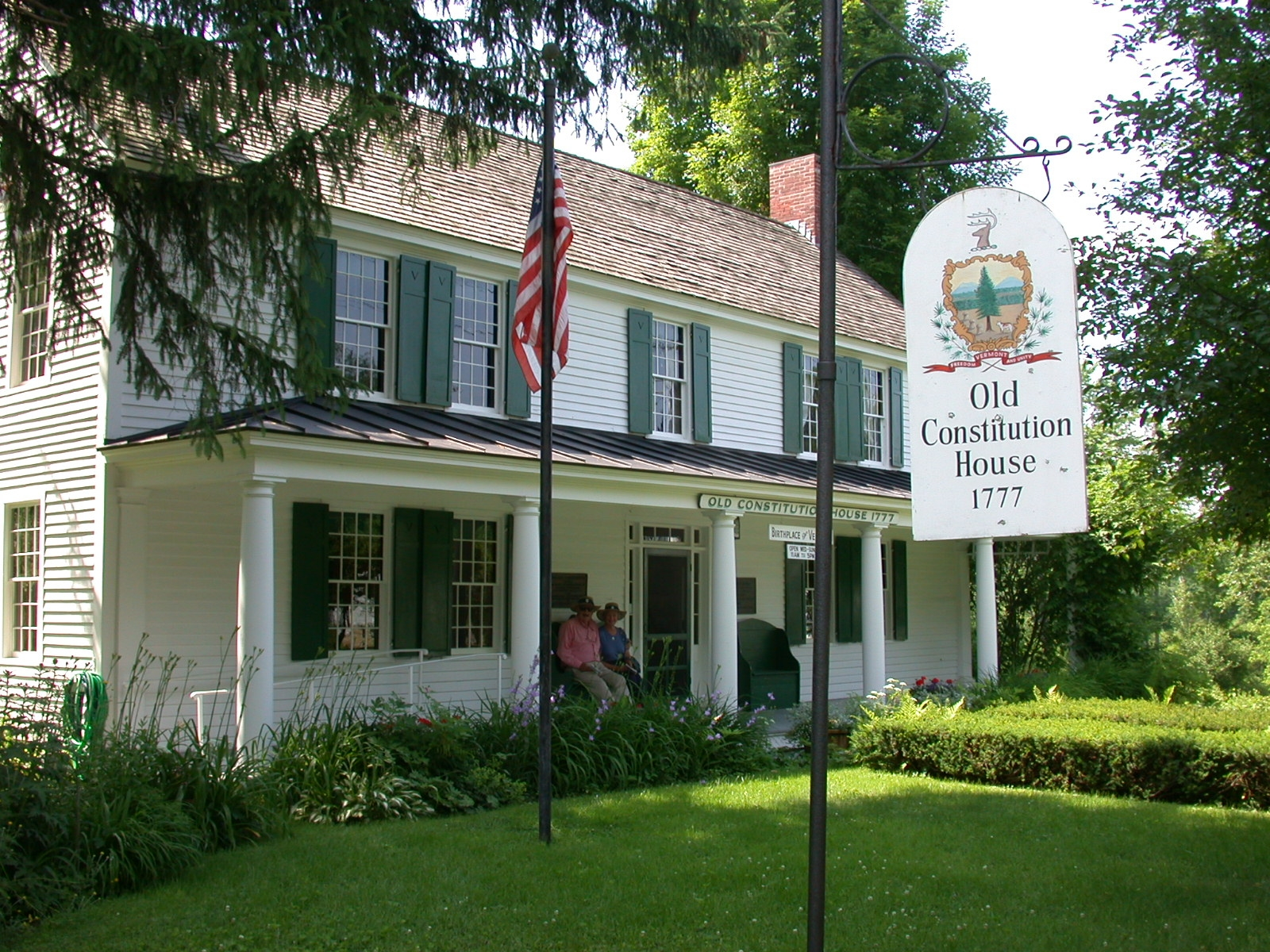
- Constitution House, Windsor, Vermont, where the Constitution of the Vermont Republic was signed in 1777
- Location: Vermont Republic; State of Vermont
- Key events: Adoption of Constitution of Vermont (1777); Admission of Vermont to the Union (1791)

Vermont was amongst the first places to abolish slavery by constitutional dictum. Although estimates place the number of slaves at 25 in 1770, slavery was banned outright upon the founding of Vermont in July 1777, and by a further provision in its Constitution, existing male slaves became free at the age of 21 and females at the age of 18. Vermont's legislature also created universal male suffrage by eliminating property ownership as a requirement; this provision included African-American men. According to the Smithsonian's National Museum of African American History and Culture, "Vermont's July 1777 declaration was not entirely altruistic either. While it did set an independent tone from the 13 colonies, the declaration's wording was vague enough to let Vermont's already-established slavery practices continue."

Chapter I of the Constitution, titled "A Declaration of the Rights of the Inhabitants of the State of Vermont" said:

no male person, born in this country, or brought from over sea, ought to be holden by law, to serve any person, as a servant, slave or apprentice, after he arrives to the age of twenty-one Years, nor female, in like manner, after she arrives to the age of eighteen years, unless they are bound by their own consent, after they arrive to such age, or bound by law, for the payment of debts, damages, fines, costs, or the like.

The state of Vermont was created in 1777 by settlers who had purchased their land from the colonial governor of New Hampshire and resisted subsequent attempts by New York's colonial government to exert jurisdiction over the area, called the New Hampshire Grants. These settlers, who named the former New Hampshire Grants "Vermont", wished to create a popular government representing their interests, among them abolishing slavery. After 1777, Vermont was repeatedly denied admission to the Union as New York and New Hampshire continued to debate jurisdiction, and it existed as the independent Vermont Republic until March 1791, after jurisdictional disputes were resolved by a compromise signed in October 1790. After Vermont was admitted as the fourteenth state in 1791, it became subject to the Fugitive Slave Clause of the Constitution of the United States (Article IV, Section 2, Clause 3) requiring fugitive slaves fleeing into a state whose laws forbid slavery to be returned. Harvey Amani Whitfield's book, The Problem of Slavery in Early Vermont, reports that among those violating the abolition of slavery were Vermont Supreme Court Judge Stephen Jacob and Levi Allen, brother of the military leader Ethan Allen.

After statehood, Vermont was subject to the Fugitive Slave Acts of 1793 and 1850, which allowed slave owners to recover fugitive slaves who fled to free states. As the movement to abolish slavery continued to grow in the 1850s, northern states including Vermont passed measures intended to bypass or nullify the Fugitive Slave Acts, and abolitionists including those in Vermont increased their efforts on behalf of runaways. Many Vermonters participated in the Underground Railroad and aided former slaves to flee to Canada. In 1858, the Vermont legislature passed the "Freedom Act", declaring that any slave who reached Vermont was automatically freed.

== 1790 census ==
The 1790 census of the United States did not reach Vermont until the following year because Vermont was not part of the United States until its admission to the Union in 1791.

The 1790 census, as published, reported 16 slaves in Vermont, all in Bennington County. This was due to a compilation error; the matter is discussed at some length in The Connecticut River Valley in southern Vermont and New Hampshire; historical sketches, published in 1929.

A Curious Census Error Reported 17 Slaves Held in Vermont in 1790

A clerical error in the office of the United States Census Bureau in its report of the first census taken in Vermont in 1790 makes that report say that there were 17 negro slaves in Vermont that year, as against the generally understood and frequently repeated assertion that no person was ever held in bondage in this state. Vermont declared against slavery in 1777, and that declaration has always been adhered to.

It is true that the printed report of the United States census of 1790 gave sixteen slaves to Vermont, all of them in Bennington County. But it has long been known that that first census, as given to the public, contained numerous errors, and that this assignment of slaves to Vermont was one of them.

The facts are that in consequence of the discovery of many errors in the reports of previous censuses, Gen. Francis A. Walker, superintendent of the census of 1870, instituted a critical comparison of the printed reports of previous censuses with the manuscript returns of the same on file in the census bureau. In the course of this examination Mr. George D. Harrington, chief clerk of the bureau, made the important discovery that in compiling the returns of Vermont the careless clerk or copyist who did the work transferred the footing of the column of "free colored" persons to the foot of the adjoining column of "slaves." Gen. Walker, in his introduction to ninth census report, noted the discovery in the following words:—

"A single result of these examinations into the earliest censuses has enough of curious and substantial interest to be noted here. The State of Vermont was, in the publication of the first census, that of 1790, put down as numbering among its inhabitants sixteen slaves. In subsequent publications this number was by a clerical or typographical error changed to seventeen; but with this accidental variation the statement of the first census has passed unchallenged; and antiquarians have even taken pains to explain in what manner it was this small number of slaves should have been found in a State otherwise through all its history a free State. The reexamination of the original census roll of Vermont at the census of 1790, for the purpose of this republication, brought to light what had never before been suspected—that these sixteen persons appeared upon the return of the assistant marshal as "Free colored." By a simple error of compilation they were introduced into a column for slaves; and this error has been perpetuated through nearly the whole history of the government until corrected in the accompanying tables." (See page 46 of Introduction to the volume of Population of the Census of 1870.)

Under the corrected table for Vermont on a subsequent page of that volume will be found the following note: "An examination of the original manuscript returns shows that there were never any slaves in Vermont. The original error occurred in preparing the result for publication when sixteen persons returned as 'free colored' were classified as 'slaves.' "

It is certainly remarkable that this erroneous assignment of slaves to Vermont should have gone uncorrected for eighty years. It was not because Vermonters of that day did not know better, for the Vermont Gazette, printed at Bennington by Anthony Haswell, in its issue of Sept. 26, 1791, said, "The return of the marshal's assistant for the county of Bennington shows that there are in the county 2503 white males over sixteen years of age, and 2617 under that age; 5559 white females; 17 black males over 4 and under 16; 15 black females. Total of inhabitants 12,254. To the honor of humanity, no slaves."

— Lyman Simpson Hayes (1929). The Connecticut River Valley in southern Vermont and New Hampshire; historical sketches. Rutland, Vt., Tuttle Co. pp. 276–278.

However, in historian Ira Berlin's 1998 work Many Thousands Gone: The First Two Centuries of Slavery in North America he cited the 1790 census figure of 16.

== Additional reading ==
Harvey Amani Whitfield, The Problem of Slavery in Early Vermont, Vermont Historical Society (2014).
