= Joseph Fay (politician) =

American politician

Secretary of State of Vermont
- In office 1778–1781
- Preceded by: Thomas Chandler Jr.
- Succeeded by: Micah Townshend

Personal details
- Born: September 11, 1753 Hardwick, Massachusetts, Province of Massachusetts Bay
- Died: October 26, 1803 (aged 50) New York City, New York, U.S.
- Party: Anti-Federalist; Democratic-Republican
- Spouse(s): Margaret Dewey; Elizabeth "Betsey" Broome
- Children: 10
- Relatives: David Fay (brother); Jonas Fay (brother); Theodore Sedgwick Fay (grandson)
- Occupation: Farmer; Merchant

Military service
- Allegiance: Vermont Republic; United States
- Service: Vermont Militia
- Years of service: 1777–1794
- Rank: Colonel
- Commands: 2nd Regiment, Vermont Militia
- Wars: American Revolutionary War

Joseph Fay (September 11, 1753 – October 26, 1803) was an American politician, militia officer, and businessman who served as Secretary of State of Vermont and was one of its principal founders.

== Biography ==
Joseph Fay was born in Hardwick, Massachusetts on September 11, 1753, the son of Stephen Fay and Ruth Child. In 1766, the Fays moved to Bennington, Vermont, where Stephen Fay owned and operated the Catamount Tavern and became a leader of the Green Mountain Boys. The Green Mountain Boys were originally organized to resist attempts by the government of New York to exert control over Vermont, including forcing the original white settlers, who had purchased land grants from New Hampshire, to purchase confirming titles from New York.

During the American Revolution the residents of Vermont sided with the new United States; Fay served as Secretary of the Vermont Council of Safety from 1777 to 1778 and Council of State from 1778 to 1784. He also served as Secretary of State from 1778 to 1781. Fay served in the 2nd Regiment of Vermont Militia, and eventually commanded the regiment with the rank of colonel. His father, four of his six brothers, and he took part in the Battle of Bennington; Fay's brother John was the battle's first casualty. In 1780, Fay was appointed an assistant commissary, responsible for procuring, storing, and transporting food and other supplies for the military.

In 1781 and 1782, Fay and Ira Allen negotiated with the British government in Canada on the subject of exchanging British prisoners held in Skenesborough. He was also involved with Ira and Ethan Allen in the Haldimand negotiations, which on the surface involved the government of Vermont possibly joining the British empire, but were likely designed to prevent the British in Canada from invading Vermont during the Revolution.

Fay owned a farm and served as Bennington's postmaster; the post office was located in his house. In 1791, Thomas Jefferson and James Madison conducted a tour of the northern states which was partly for botanical exploration and partly for political organizing; they talked extensively with Fay, who was becoming recognized as an adherent of what became the Anti-Federalist Party, also called the Jeffersonians, and later the Democratic-Republicans. Fay later sent Jefferson maple tree seeds, and they maintained a long correspondence that covered farming, botany, and politics, in addition to other topics.

In 1794 he moved to New York City, where he became an import merchant and land speculator Fay died there in 1803 as the result of yellow fever, which he contracted during an epidemic. His death is believed to have occurred between October 20 and 26. He had joined the First Presbyterian Church, which recorded his death date as October 26. In addition, his will was witnessed on October 24, and the first newspaper accounts of his death were published on October 26, so October 26 is the most likely date of death. Because he was buried with many others in the middle of the yellow fever epidemic, the exact location of his grave is not known.

== Family ==
Joseph Fay was married to Margaret Dewey, with whom he had six children. After her death he married Elizabeth "Betsey" Broome, with whom he had four more children.

Fay's brother David Fay was also involved in Vermont politics and government, including service as United States Attorney for Vermont, associate justice of the Vermont Supreme Court, and adjutant general of the Vermont Militia. His brother Jonas Fay, served in several political positions during Vermont's early years, including Justice of the Vermont Supreme Court.

Theodore Sedgwick Fay, a writer and diplomat who served as Minister to Switzerland, was the grandson of Joseph Fay.

Political offices
Preceded by Thomas Chandler Jr.	Secretary of State of Vermont; 1778 – 1781	Succeeded by Micah Townshend
