= Constitution of Vermont (1777) =

Constitution for the Vermont Republic

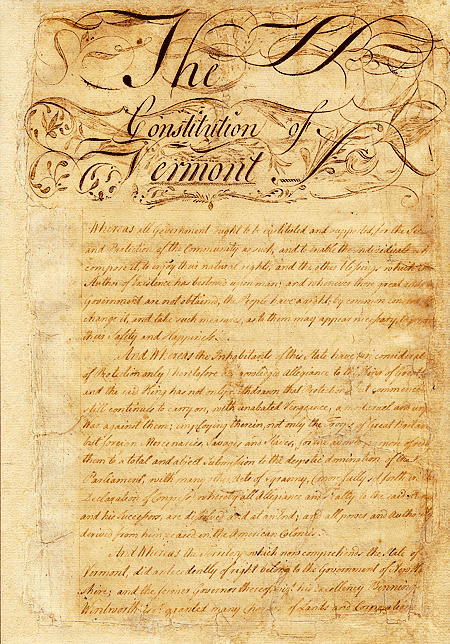
Vellum manuscript of the Constitution of Vermont, 1777. This constitution was amended in 1786, and again in 1793 following Vermont's admission to the federal union in 1791.

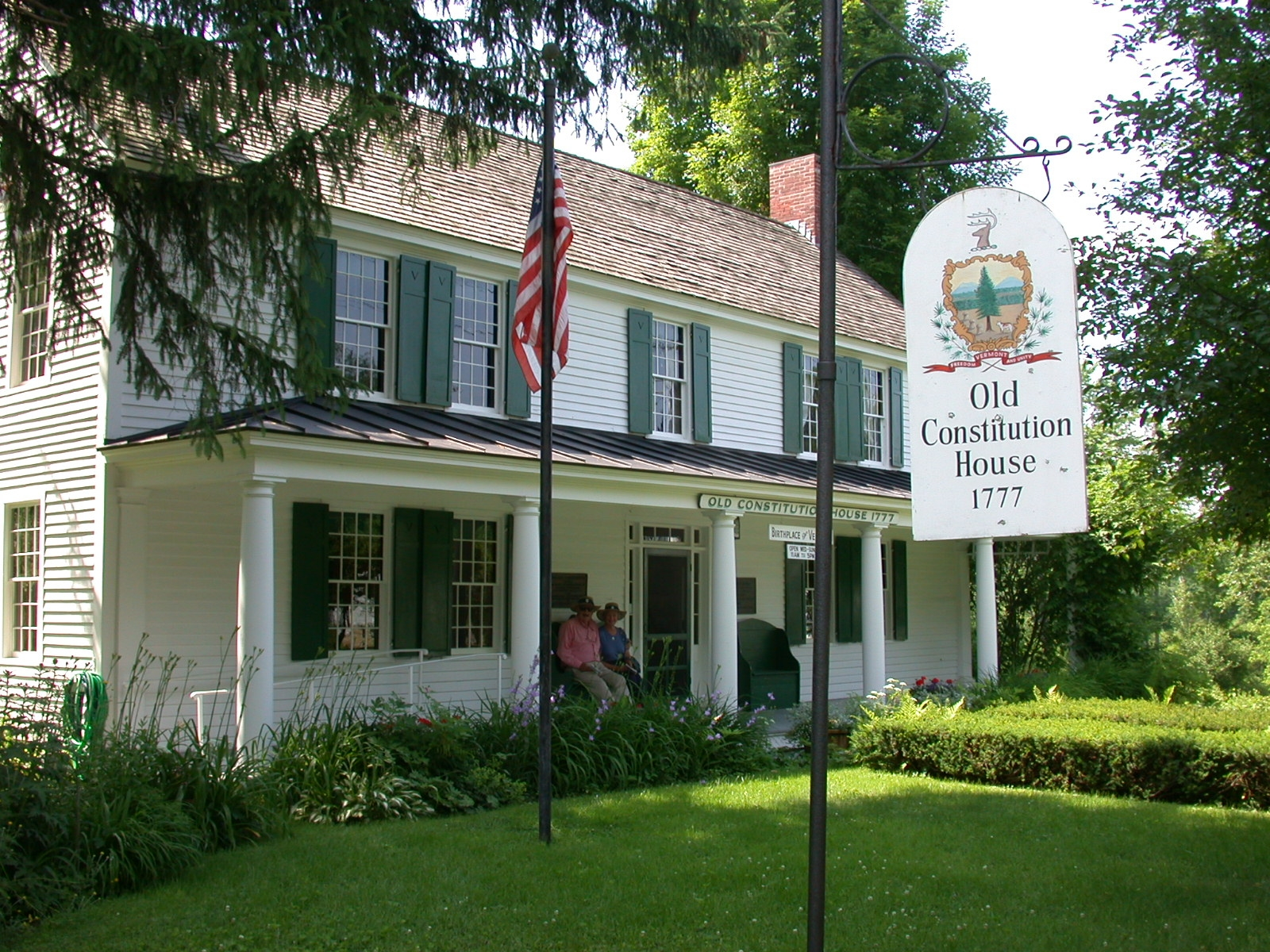
The Old Constitution House in Windsor, Vermont, where the constitution of the Vermont Republic was signed.

The first Constitution of Vermont was published in July 1777, almost five months after Vermont declared itself an independent country, now frequently called the Vermont Republic. It was in effect until its extensive revision in 1786. The second Constitution of Vermont went into effect in 1786 and lasted until 1793, two years after Vermont was admitted to the Union as the fourteenth state. In 1791 Vermont became the fourteenth US state and in 1793 it adopted its current constitution.

== Background ==
In addition to the military conflict with Great Britain, New York and New Hampshire both held claims to Vermont. Following the outbreak of the Revolutionary War, New Yorkers and New Hampshire Grants residents seized on the opportunity to gain power for their respective regions. New York even attempted to collect taxes from Vermont citizens. At the 1776 Dorset Convention, the people of the New Hampshire Grants took a major step towards independence. They produced, as Michael Bellesiles noted, an "'Association' [...] of the people,' [...] but not as New Yorkers. Swearing allegiance to the revolutionary struggle under an authority other than New York's marked the association as a significant political statement." The Patriot defeat at the Battle of Valcour Island gave "Grants inhabitants the opportunity to found a new state." Vermont addressed both New York's and New Hampshire's claims in its Declaration of Independence, proclaiming itself free of the British and the two states' influence. Vermont's political situation became so dire that at the Westminster Convention of January 1777—in spite of New York's and New Hampshire's claims, according to Bellesiles—the people of the New Hampshire Grants "voted unanimously to 'be a new and separate state; and for the future conduct themselves as such.'" Vermont's Declaration of Independence had sixteen complaints against New York; their arguments were primarily focused on New York imposing, in their opinion, its unjust governance system on the Grants inhabitants and New York's attempts to make it more difficult to own land. As Bellesiles noted, Vermonters addressed New York's "'monopolizing land traders' who controlled New York's government, which had withdrawn its protection [...] [and claimed] the people [of Vermont] had a right to form themselves into a political community." Vermont's struggle for freedom helped strengthen republican sentiment in the area; "Vermont became a state because the people consented to its creation."

The journal of the Council of Censors in June and October 1813 and January 1814. The Council of Censors dealt with state constitutional issues and suggested improvements in government; they were elected every seven years.

Vermont, along with several other states, abolished tax benefits for the Anglican church.

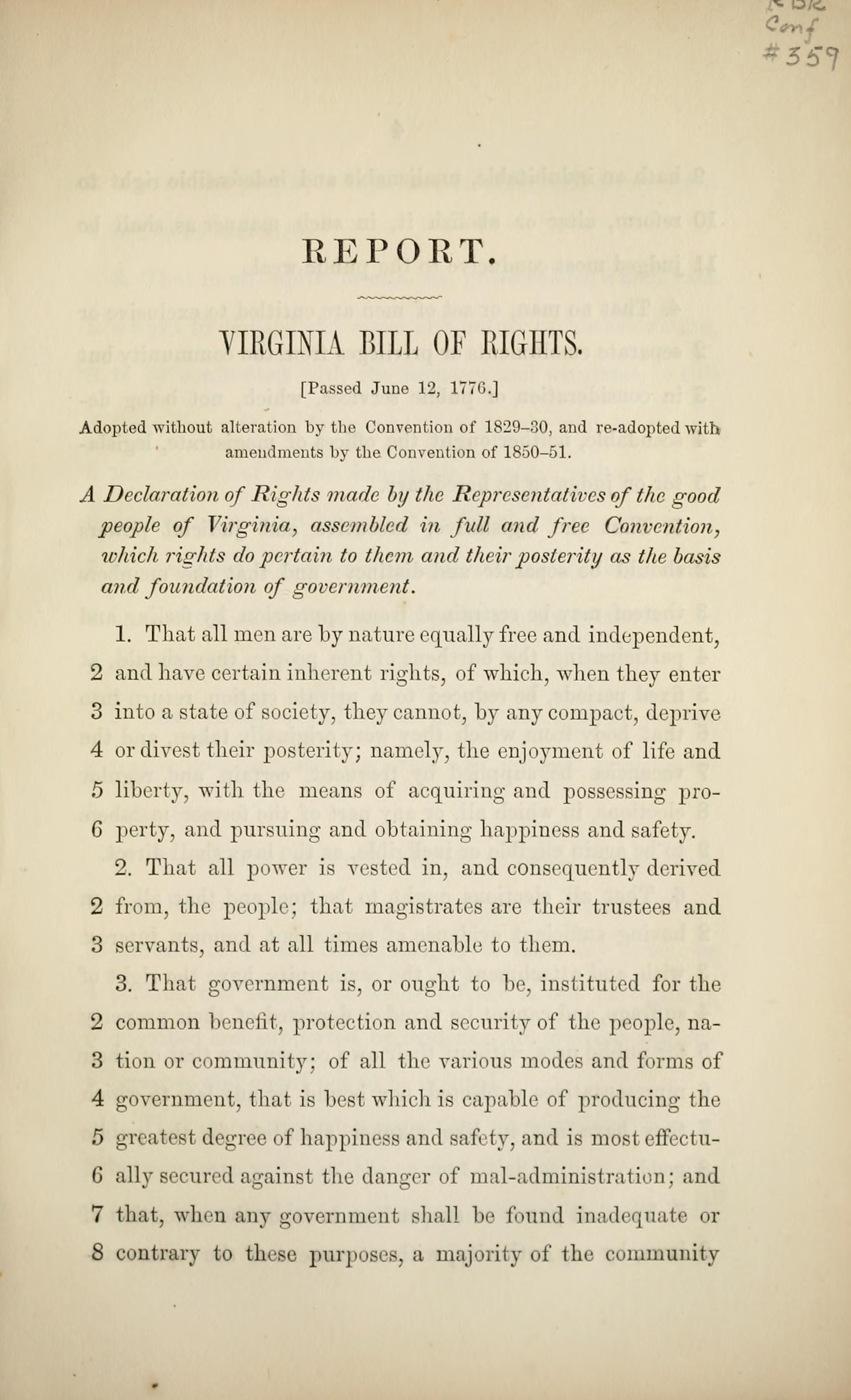
Vermont's protections for a free press primarily pertained to government affairs; this is significantly different than Virginia's Bill of Rights (pictured above), which stated "the freedom of press can never be restrained."

Bellesiles argues that Vermont's governing systems reflected "the highest ideals of republicanism [,] [...] creating the most democratic structure of its time." The Vermont Constitution enshrined "freedom of speech, print, and public assembly, a modified freedom of religion, the right to fair and open trial before jury, and the people's right to form new governments as they see fit." Ordinary voters held the most power in the system, reflected in the power of the General Assembly; the Council of Vermont and Governor could not veto legislation from the Assembly, clearly reflecting republican ideology. Early Vermont was incredibly transparent for its time; all meetings about new laws were public, and laws could only be passed a year after their first proposal, so it could be printed for the public's information. Vermonters similarly had significant control over their financial systems. They minimized creditors' powers in the state. The Constitution prevented courts from taking legal action against a person or their property except in dire cases. The Constitution even mandated the option of a jury trial for civil cases, and allowed local governments to control any potential fees. Bellesiles argued that "sovereignty lay in the distinct townships, through which Vermonters could easily change their system of government."

Each community received at least one representative; communities with over 80 voters had two representatives. This gave Vermonters significant bargaining power because, Bellesiles claimed, "The people interacted with their state government through their community, not as isolated individuals." Vermont established a Council of Censors, responsible for evaluating legislative and executive actions and ensuring the Constitution's role in state affairs every seven years, preserving its democracy. The Council of Censors was responsible for ensuring taxes were collected and appropriated fairly.

Vermont's Constitution faced fierce criticism. As Bellesiles detailed, "Timothy Dwight, fumed that 'a Legislature by a single house is of course no other than an organized mob. Its deliberations are necessarily tumultuous, violent & indecent.'" The radicals of [...] Vermont rejected this logic as aristocratic, insisting instead on the existence of a 'homogenous community of interest', which superseded class distinctions." Further contributing to Vermont's republican nature, the state, according to Kevin Ingraham, "was a rural, agrarian and backcountry region, populated by small subsistence farmers who shared a common set of interests and grievances."

Although the Vermont Constitution was largely modeled after Pennsylvania's Constitution, the two had drastic differences. For example, Vermont allowed citizens to vote regardless of whether they paid taxes. Vermonters could vote regardless of their property status; voting rights extended to all men over the age of 21. As Bellesiles noted, "while as few as 10 percent of the adult males could vote just over the border in Dutchess and Albany counties, Vermont placed no property restrictions on the franchise. No state in the Union made such an effort to include so many of its inhabitants in its decision making. No other state succeeded in divorcing property from liberty."

== 1777 Constitution ==
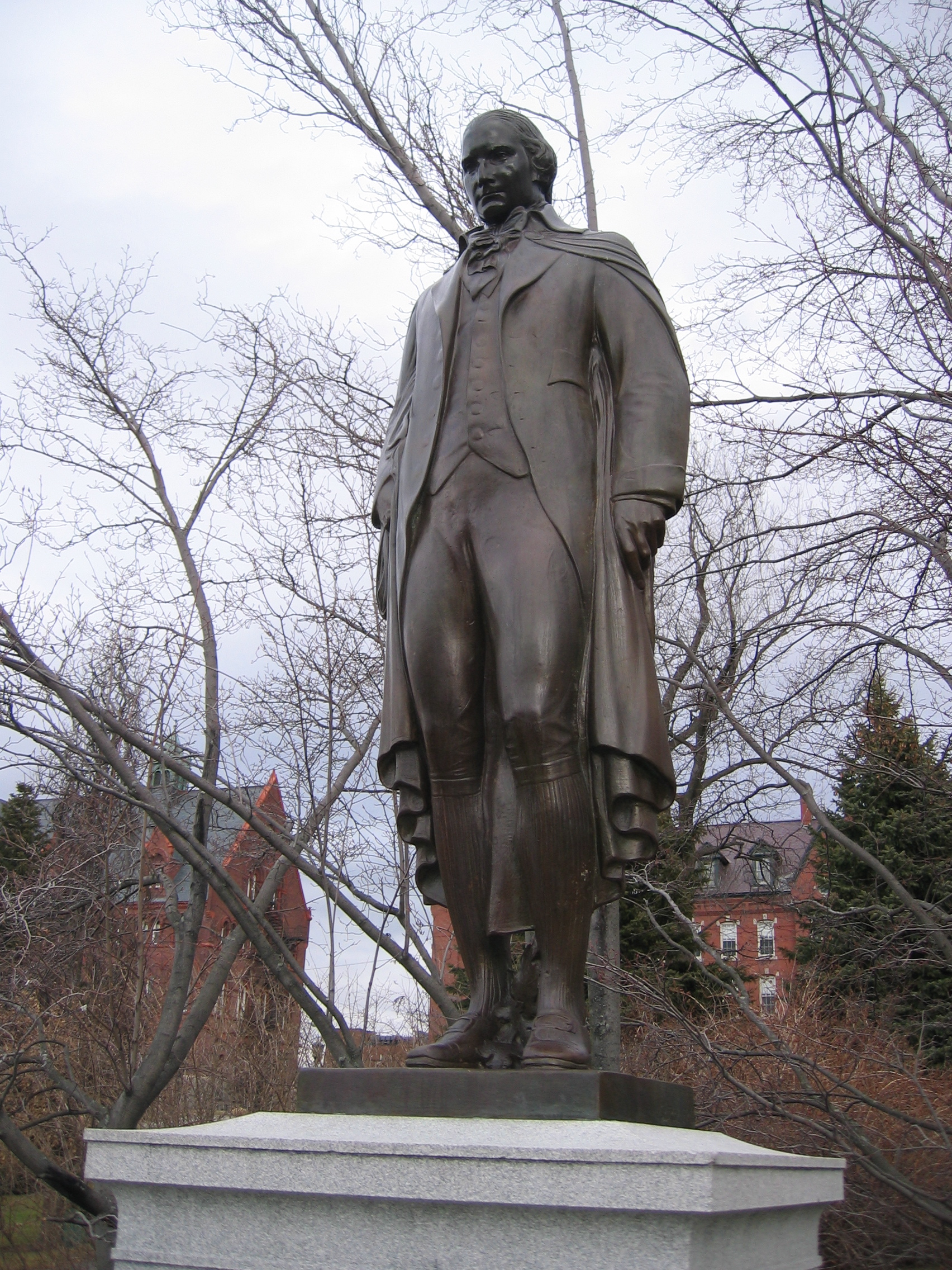
A statue of Ira Allen. Allen was notable for his account of Bennington's objection to the Vermont Constitution because the people did not ratify it.

The constitution was adopted on July 8, 1777, at the tavern in Windsor now known as the Old Constitution House and administered as a state historic site. Each township in Vermont was advised to send representatives to Windsor for the assembly; Bennington notably objected to the Constitution because the Vermont people did not ratify it, according to Ira Allen. The constitution consisted of three main parts. The first was a preamble reminiscent of the United States Declaration of Independence:

It is absolutely necessary, for the welfare and safety of the inhabitants of this State, that it should be, henceforth, a free and independent State; and that a just, permanent, and proper form of government, should exist in it, derived from, and founded on, the authority of the people only, agreeable to the direction of the honorable American Congress.

(Here the term "American Congress" refers to the Continental Congress.)

Jonas Fay was a delegate to the convention; he was named chairman of the committee appointed to draft the declaration announcing the creation of the Vermont Republic, and received credit as the document's primary author.

The Vermont Constitution provided protections of several key liberties in the first chapter including freedom of the press and religion along with the right to vote, own property, bear arms, emigrate, assemble, petition, and be protected under the due process of law. It also allowed for eminent domain and established that civil service employees and representatives served on behalf of their constituents. It ensured that crimes in Vermont were always prosecuted within the state. In the second chapter, the Constitution outlines the structure of government and roles of each branch, notably creating a Council of Censors to preserve democratic processes.

=== Chapter 1 ===
The second part of the 1777 constitution was Chapter 1, a "Declaration of the Rights of the Inhabitants of the State of Vermont." This chapter was composed of 19 articles guaranteeing various civil and political rights in Vermont:

- The first article declared that "all men are born equally free and independent, and have certain natural, inherent and unalienable rights, amongst which are the enjoying and defending life and liberty; acquiring, possessing and protecting property, and pursuing and obtaining happiness and safety," echoing the famous phrases in the Declaration of Independence that declared that "all men are created equal" and possess "inalienable rights," including "life, liberty and the pursuit of happiness." The article went on to declare that because of these principles, "no male person, born in this country, or brought from over sea, ought to be holden by law, to serve any person, as a servant, slave or apprentice, after he arrives to the age of twenty-one Years, nor female, in like manner, after she arrives to the age of eighteen years, unless they are bound by their own consent." This was the first such ban on slavery in the New World. See also History of slavery in Vermont.
- The second article declared that "private property ought to be subservient to public uses, when necessity requires it; nevertheless, whenever any particular man's property is taken for the use of the public, the owner ought to receive an equivalent in money." This established the basic principles of eminent domain in Vermont.
- The third article established freedom of religion. Vermont followed the precedent of several other states (including New York, New Jersey, Pennsylvania, Delaware, North Carolina, and South Carolina) in abolishing, as Shelby M. Balik phrased it, "the privileged status of the Anglican church with their first constitution." It did not mention how to tax religious institutions, leaving the issue to the Assembly. It likewise promoted the "encouragement of virtue and prevention of vice and immorality." Vermont's protection of freedom of religion only extended to Protestants. This is significantly different from the Pennsylvania Constitution it is based on, which protected "any man who acknowledges being of a God."
- The fourth through seventh articles subordinated the government to the interests of the people.
- The eighth article gave all freemen the right to vote (even if they owned no property).
- The ninth article said that since everyone has a right to be protected in his life, liberty, and property, that he ought to contribute his share to the expense of that protection.
- The tenth through the thirteenth articles concerned due process of law.
- The fourteenth through sixteenth articles concerned freedom of speech, freedom of the press, the right to bear arms, and the subordination of the military to the civil power. Notably, unlike the Constitution of the United States, the right to bear arms for self defense is explicitly mentioned. Vermont's protection of free speech applied primarily to government proceedings, highlighting its Framers' belief in the press's role in civil discourse. However, Vermont's protections of free speech were not as strong as Virginia's Bill of Rights, which stated that the freedom of the press "can never be restrained."
- The seventeenth article recognizes a right to emigrate.
- The eighteenth article recognizes rights of assembly and petition.
- The nineteenth article says no one should be liable to be transported from Vermont to any other place to be tried for offenses committed in Vermont.

=== Chapter 2 ===
Chapter 2 of the Constitution is called A Plan or Frame of Government.

- Sections I through IV of Chapter 2 provide that "THE COMMONWEALTH or STATE of VERMONT, shall be governed, hereafter, by a Governor, Deputy Governor, Council, and an Assembly of the Representatives of the Freemen of the same". It vests executive power in the governor and council, and legislative power in the House of Representatives, and requires a court of justice to be established in every county.
- Section V prescribes universal military training.
- Section VI says every man at least 21 years old (even those not owning property) may vote if they take an oath promising to vote consistently with the interests of the state of Vermont. (The Vermont voter's oath is still required today for first-time voters when they register. None of the other states require an oath of voters.)
- Sections VII through IX and XI through XVI provide for annual election of legislators and annual legislative sessions.
- Section X says the legislature is to elect delegates to the Continental Congress. (However, the Continental Congress refused to recognize the independence of Vermont and to allow it representation.)
- Sections XVII and XVIII deal with the powers of the governor and council, in particular making the governor the commander-in-chief of the military.
- Sections XXI through XXVI deal with courts of law, in particular the supreme court and the courts of common pleas.
- Section XLIV established the Council of Censors, which was elected every seven years to suggest improvements and preserve the Constitution's role in Vermont government. The Council of Censors had, as Willi Paul Adams noted, "venerable predecessors in Greek and Roman history."

Chapter 2 continues through 44 Sections.

In the broader context of the Revolution, Vermont's Constitution is one of the more democratic of the states' founding documents. Vermonters' belief in their democracy and government was strong; the 1786 and later 1793 Constitutional Convention had the potential to create serious democratic backsliding. Instead, Vermont delegates — reflecting their constituents's beliefs — supported small changes to the Constitution but overwhelmingly upheld their commitment to republicanism. Even the similarly democratic Pennsylvania Constitution (which the Vermont Constitution was based on), abandoned, as Ingraham noted, "Many of the most inspiring ideas still in use in Vermont today [...], making the Vermont Constitution more special than promised in 1777." The absence of similar democratic measures in other states best exemplifies the limits of the Revolution. As Ingraham concluded, "[The American Revolution] is best understood not as a watershed event that radically changed American society, but rather as one episode in a much longer continuum of change."

== 1786 Constitution ==
The 1786 Constitution of Vermont established a greater separation of powers than what had prevailed under the 1777 Constitution. In particular, it forbade anyone to simultaneously hold more than one of certain offices: governor, lieutenant-governor, judge of the supreme court, treasurer of the state, member of the governor's council, member of the legislature, surveyor-general, or sheriff. It also provided that the legislature could no longer function as a court of appeals nor otherwise intervene in cases before the courts, as it had often done.

The 1786 Constitution continued in effect when, in 1791, Vermont made the transition from independence to the status of one of the states of the Union. In particular, the governor, the members of the governor's council, and other officers of the state, including judges in all courts, simply continued their terms of office that were already underway.

== 1793 Constitution ==
The 1793 Constitution was adopted two years after Vermont's admission to the Union and continues in effect, with various later amendments, to this day. It eliminated all mention of grievances against King George III and against the State of New York. In 1790, New York's legislature finally renounced its claims that Vermont was a part of New York, the cessation of those claims being effective if and when Congress decided to admit Vermont.

== See also ==
- History of Vermont
- History of slavery in Vermont
