= Thomas Leverett =

American politician (1765–1833)

Thomas Leverett (July 10, 1765 – April 8, 1833) was a Vermont government official whose service included several years as Secretary of State of Vermont.

== Biography ==
Thomas Leverett was born in Boston, Massachusetts on July 10, 1765, the son of John and Mary Leverett. As an adult, he resided in Windsor, Vermont, where he was long active in public service.

A member of the Democratic-Republican Party, beginning in 1802 Leverett served as Windsor's postmaster. He also held several other positions, including auditor of the state treasury, federal collector of internal revenue for the district that included Windsor, and superintendent of the state prison in Windsor.

From 1806 to 1813, Leverett served as Vermont's Secretary of State.

Leverett died in Windsor on April 8, 1833. He was buried at Old South Church Cemetery in Windsor.

== Family ==
On November 6, 1790, Leverett married Susannah (or Susan) Johnson (or Johnstone) at Christ's Church in Middlebury, Connecticut. They were the parents of seven children: John (b. 1792), Charles Johnson (b. 1793), William (b. 1797), Susan (b.1800), George (b. 1802), Caroline Hallam (b. 1804), and Thomas H. (b. 1806).

== Sources ==
=== Books ===
- Aldrich, Lewis Cass; Holmes, Frank R. (1891). History of Windsor County, Vermont. Syracuse, NY: D. Mason & Co. pp. 310–311.
- Conlin, Katherine E. (1977). Chronicles of Windsor, 1761-1975. Taftsville, VT: Countryman Press. p. 137.
- Russell, John (1812). An Authentic History of the Vermont State Prison, 1807-1812. Montpelier, VT: Wright and Sibley. p. 79.
- United States Department of State (1822). Register of All Officers and Agents, Civil, Military, and Naval, in the Service of the United States. Washington, DC: Davis & Force. p. 51.

=== Internet ===
- Condos, James (2011). "Vermont Secretaries of State, 1778-Present". Vermont Government Officials: State Officers. Montpelier, VT: Vermont Secretary of State.
- "Connecticut Church Record Abstracts, 1630-1920". Ancestry.com. Provo, UT: Ancestry.com, LLC.
- "Massachusetts Town and Vital Records: Boston, 1620-1988; Birth Entry for Thomas Leverett". Ancestry.com. Provo, UT: Ancestry.com, LLC.
- "Vermont Vital Records, 1720-1908: Death and Burial Entry for Thomas Leverett". Ancestry.com. Provo, UT: Ancestry.com, LLC.

=== Newspapers ===
- Spooner, Alden (October 31, 1808). "Report of the Auditor in the Treasury Department of the State of Vermont". Vermont Journal. Windsor, VT. p. 3.
- "Obituary, Thomas Leverett". American Repository. St. Albans, VT. April 25, 1833. p. 3.

Political offices
| Preceded by David Wing Jr. | Secretary of State of Vermont; 1806 – 1813 | Succeeded by Josiah Dunham |
