= David Wing Jr. =

American politician (1766–1806)

David Wing Jr. (June 24, 1766 – September 13, 1806) was an American politician who served for four years as Secretary of State of Vermont.

== Biography ==
David Wing Jr. was born in Rochester, Massachusetts on June 24, 1766. He was educated in Rochester and became a farmer and school teacher. In 1790, he moved to Montpelier, Vermont, as did his father and several other family members.

Wing continued to farm and teach school, and became a merchant. He was soon called to serve in local and state government. In 1795, he was appointed town clerk, and he served until his death. From 1797 to 1806, he also served as a town selectman; he also held other positions in the town government, including auditor and lister. He served in the Vermont House of Representatives from 1797 to 1801, and was instrumental in obtaining approval to make Montpelier the state capital. An adherent of the Federalist Party, from 1802 to 1806, Wing served as Vermont's Secretary of State.

Montpelier was part of Caledonia County until the formation of Washington County; when the Caledonia County court was organized in 1797, Wing was elected one of the first side judges. He served until 1803, when he advanced to presiding judge, and he served as presiding judge from 1804 until his death.

== Death and burial ==
Wing died of typhus in Montpelier on September 13, 1806. He was buried at Elm Street Cemetery in Montpelier.

== Family ==
In 1792, Wing married Hannah Davis, a daughter of Colonel Jacob Davis, one of Montpelier's founders. They were the parents of eight children: Debby Daphne, Christopher Columbus, Algernon Sidney, Marcus Tullius Cicero, Maria Theresa, David Davis, Carolina Augusta, and Maximus Fabius.

== Sources ==
- Child, Hamilton (1887). Gazetteer of Caledonia and Essex Counties, Vt. 1764-1887. Syracuse, NY: Syracuse Journal Company. pp. 35–36.
- Hemenway, Abby Maria (1882). The History of the Town of Montpelier. Montpelier, VT: J. Poland. pp. 272, 431–432, 441.
- Thompson, Daniel P. (1860). History of the Town of Montpelier. Montpelier, VT: E. P. Walton. pp. 68, 105, 290–291.
- Contributor Paula (December 17, 2011). "Memorial, David Wing Jr". Find A Grave. Provo, UT: Find A Grave, LLC.

Political offices
Preceded by Roswell Hopkins	Secretary of State of Vermont; 1802 – 1806	Succeeded by Thomas Leverett
