= Windsor, Vermont =

- Town
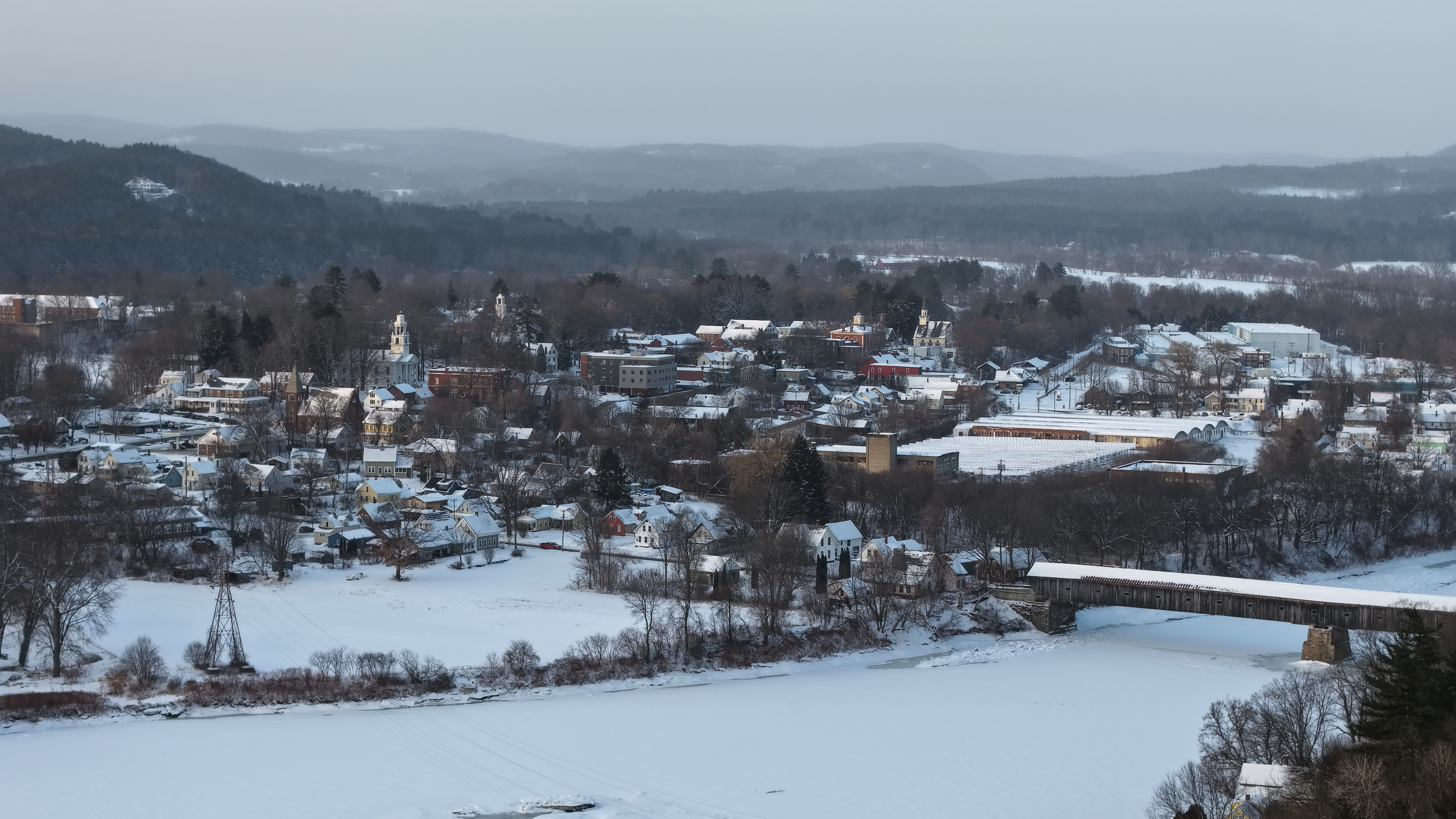
- Windsor, Vermont, with the Cornish-Windsor Covered Bridge visible at bottom-right

- Flag Seal
- Mottoes: Birthplace of Vermont; Freedom and Unity
- Location in Windsor County and the state of Vermont.
- Coordinates: 43°29′37″N 72°25′19″W
- Country: United States
- State: Vermont
- County: Windsor
- Communities: Windsor

Area
  - Total: 19.8 sq mi (51.2 km^{2})
  - Land: 19.5 sq mi (50.6 km^{2})
  - Water: 0.23 sq mi (0.6 km^{2})
- Elevation: 1,132 ft (345 m)

Population (2020)
  - Total: 3,559
  - Density: 182/sq mi (70.3/km^{2})
- Time zone: UTC-5 (Eastern (EST))
  - Summer (DST): UTC-4 (EDT)
- ZIP Codes: 05089 (Windsor); 05037 (Brownsville)
- Area code: 802
- FIPS code: 50-84925
- GNIS feature ID: 1462266
- Website: www.windsorvt.org

Windsor is a town in Windsor County, Vermont, United States. As the "Birthplace of Vermont", the town is where the Constitution of Vermont was adopted in 1777, thus marking the founding of the Vermont Republic, a sovereign state until 1791, when Vermont joined the United States. Over much of its history, Windsor was home to a variety of manufacturing enterprises. Its population was 3,559 at the 2020 census.

== History ==
One of the New Hampshire grants, Windsor was chartered as a town on July 6, 1761, by colonial governor Benning Wentworth. It was first settled in August 1764 by Captain Steele Smith and his family from Farmington, Connecticut. In 1777, the signers of the Constitution of the Vermont Republic met at Old Constitution House, a tavern at the time, to declare independence from the Great Britain (the Vermont Republic would not become a state until 1791). In 1820, it was the state's largest town, a thriving center for trade and agriculture. In 1835, the first dam was built across Mill Brook to provide water power. Factories made guns, machinery, tinware, furniture and harnesses. The community is named for Windsor, Connecticut.

In 1846, Robbins and Lawrence received a government contract to manufacture firearms. Using advanced machine tools to produce interchangeable parts, they and their associates established factories in the Connecticut River valley and throughout New England. Two factories, now both closed, sustained the economy of Windsor: Cone Automatic Machine Company and a Goodyear Tire and Rubber Company plant.

Windsor village began development at the end of the 18th century and achieved importance in Vermont history as the location of the framing of the constitution of Vermont. It is known as the birthplace of Vermont, where the state constitution was signed, and acted as the first capital until 1805 when Montpelier became the official state capital.

Commerce prospered due to the village's location on the banks of the Connecticut River where several smaller streams run into it. The economy improved in the mid-19th century when Windsor became the first town in the state to break ground for the railroad with the construction of a rail depot. Windsor Station connected the town to out-of-state markets. It was after the railroad went through that the area was discovered by tourists.

Windsor's war memorial, the City Center Veterans Memorial, was created by sculptor Lawrence Nowlan.

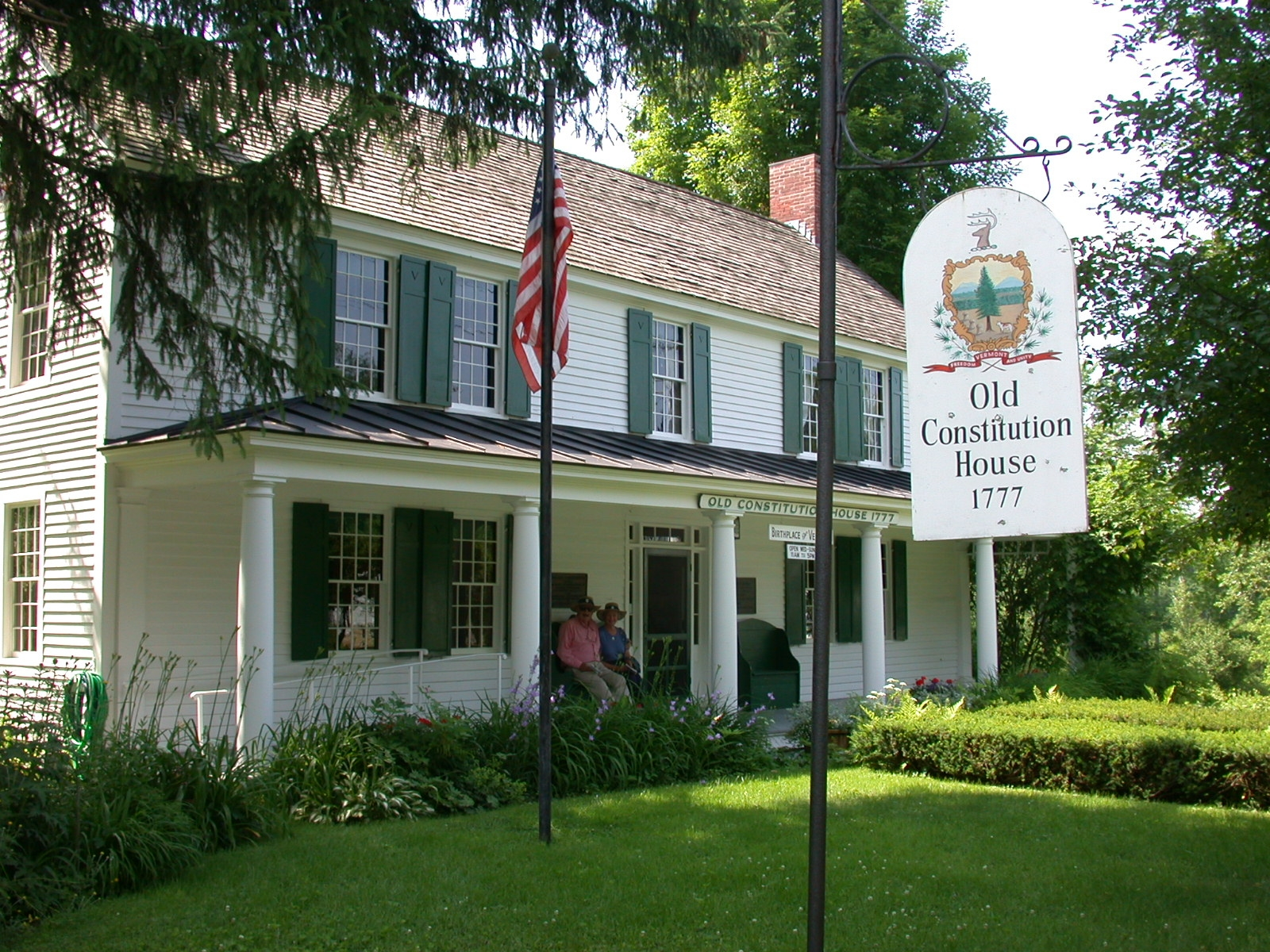
Old Constitution House, where the Constitution of the Vermont Republic was signed

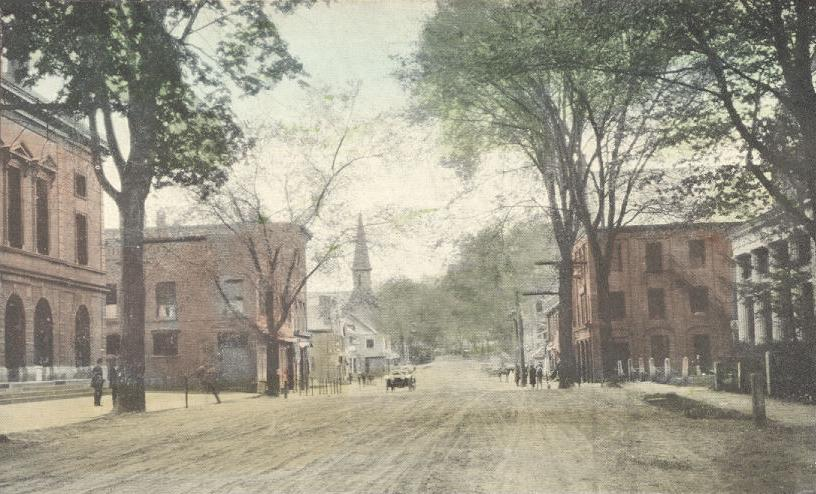
Main Street c. 1910

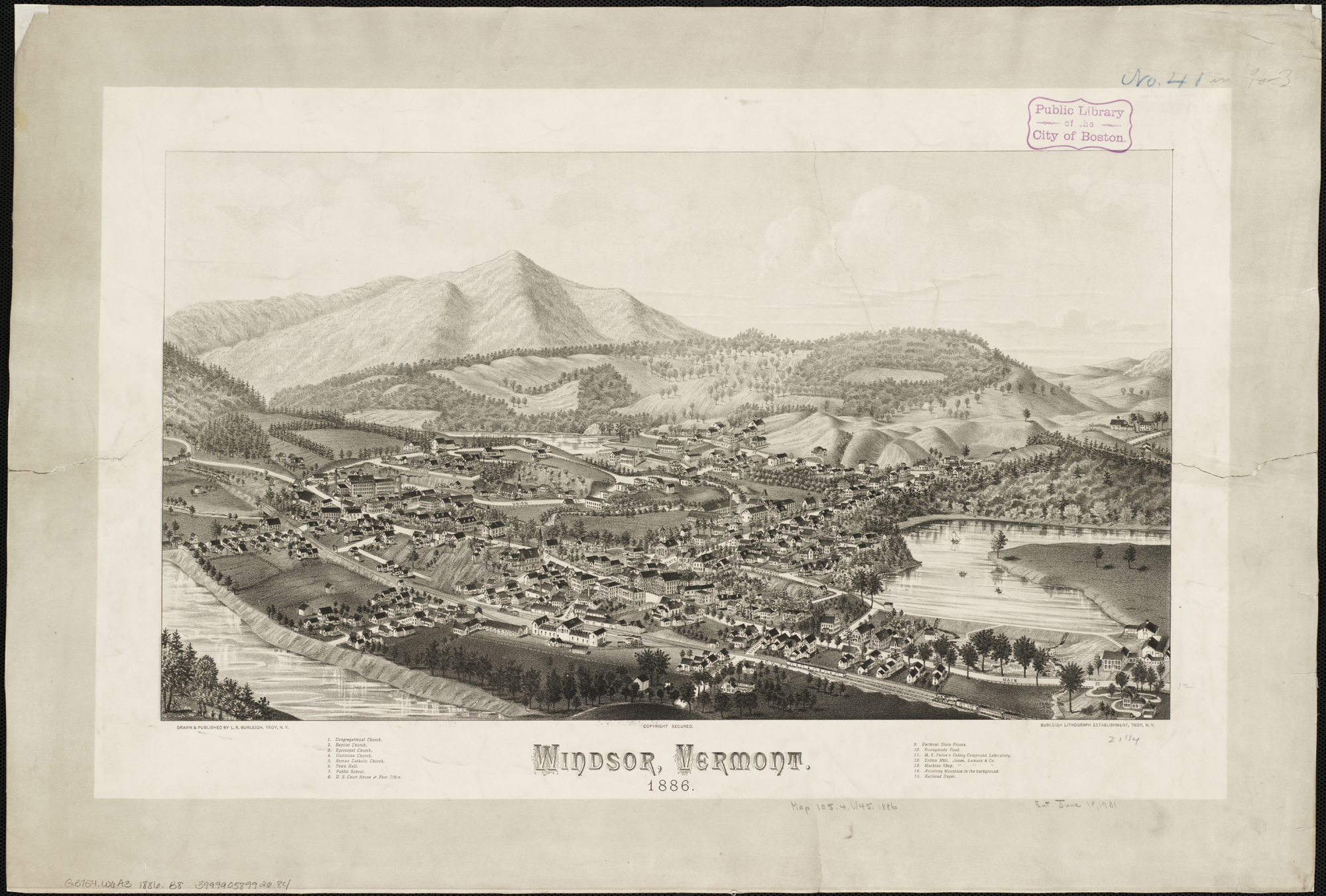
Print of Windsor from 1886 by L.R. Burleigh with list of landmarks depicted

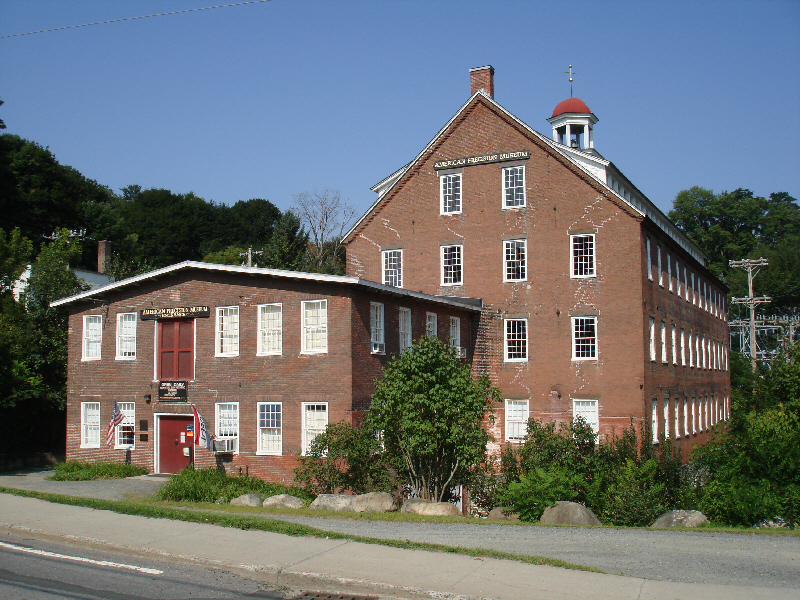
American Precision Museum is the old Robbins and Lawrence factory.

== Geography ==
According to the United States Census Bureau, the town has a total area of 19.8 square miles (51.2 km^{2}), of which 19.5 square miles (50.6 km^{2}) is land and 0.2 square mile (0.5 km^{2}) (1.06%) is water. Home to part of Mount Ascutney, Windsor is situated beside the Connecticut River.

The town is crossed by Interstate 91, U.S. Route 5, Vermont Route 12, Vermont Route 44, and Vermont Route 44A. It is bordered by the town of Weathersfield to the south, West Windsor to the west, and Hartland to the north. To the east, across the Connecticut River, is Cornish, New Hampshire, to which Windsor is connected by the Cornish–Windsor Covered Bridge, one of the longest covered bridges in the world.

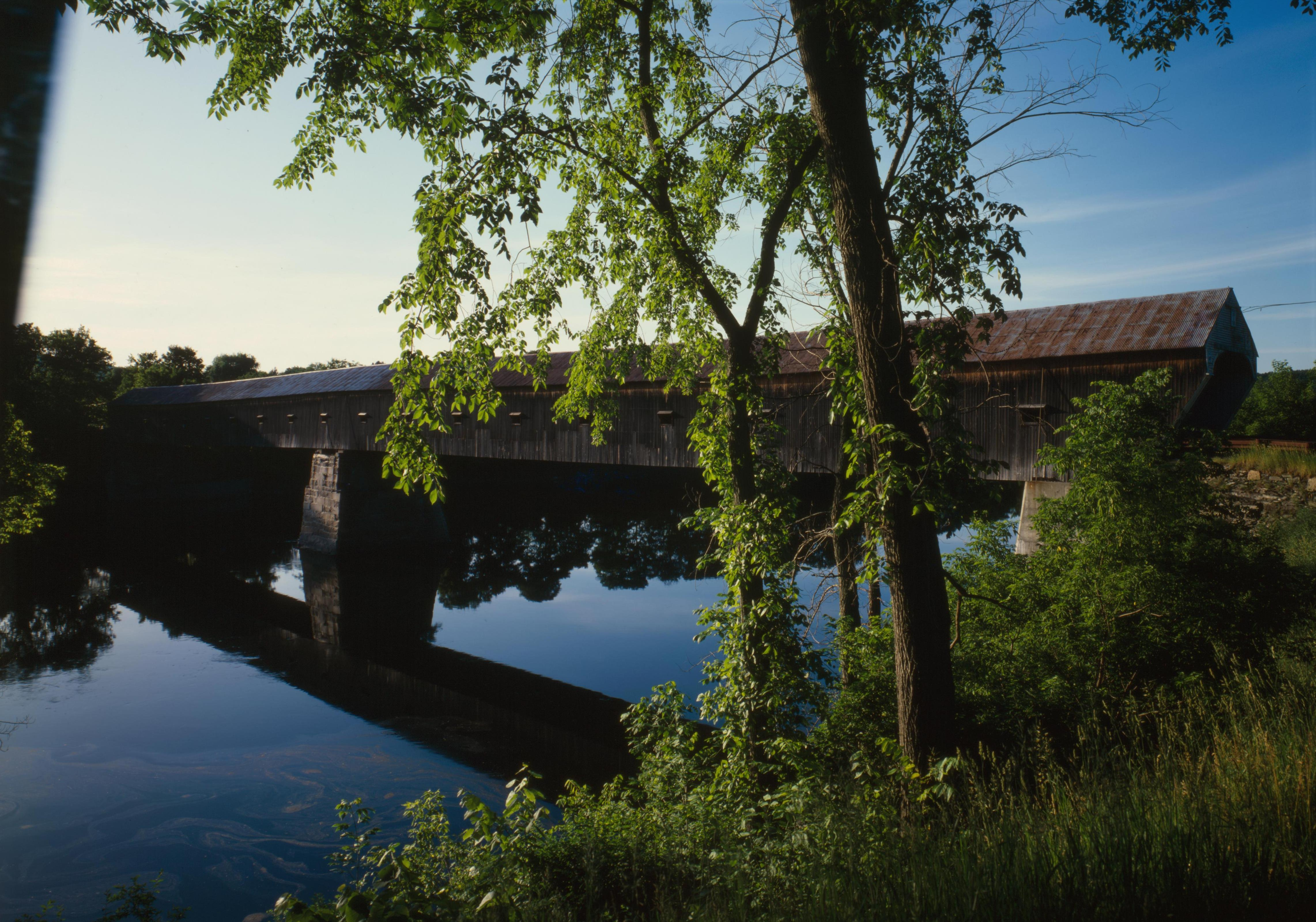
Cornish–Windsor Covered Bridge, built 1866, rebuilt 1988

== Demographics ==
Historical population
Census	Pop.	Note	%±
1790	1,542		—
1800	2,211		43.4%
1810	2,757		24.7%
1820	2,956		7.2%
1830	3,134		6.0%
1840	2,744		−12.4%
1850	1,928		−29.7%
1860	1,669		−13.4%
1870	1,699		1.8%
1880	2,175		28.0%
1890	1,846		−15.1%
1900	2,119		14.8%
1910	2,407		13.6%
1920	3,687		53.2%
1930	4,359		18.2%
1940	4,155		−4.7%
1950	4,402		5.9%
1960	4,468		1.5%
1970	4,158		−6.9%
1980	4,085		−1.8%
1990	3,714		−9.1%
2000	3,756		1.1%
2010	3,553		−5.4%
2020	3,559		0.2%
U.S. Decennial Census

As of the census of 2000, there were 3,756 people, 1,520 households, and 945 families residing in the town. The population density was 192.1 people per square mile (74.2/km^{2}). There were 1,611 housing units at an average density of 82.4 per square mile (31.8/km^{2}). The racial makeup of the town was 97.74% White, 0.24% African American, 0.40% Native American, 0.27% Asian, 0.24% from other races, and 1.12% from two or more races. Hispanic or Latino of any race were 1.06% of the population.

There were 1,520 households, out of which 28.5% had children under the age of 18 living with them, 45.3% were couples living together and joined in either marriage or civil union, 12.2% had a female householder with no husband present, and 37.8% were non-families. 31.8% of all households were made up of individuals, and 15.5% had someone living alone who was 65 years of age or older. The average household size was 2.29 and the average family size was 2.83.

In the town, the population was spread out, with 22.2% under the age of 18, 7.3% from 18 to 24, 26.9% from 25 to 44, 23.0% from 45 to 64, and 20.7% who were 65 years of age or older. The median age was 41 years. For every 100 females, there were 91.0 males. For every 100 females age 18 and over, there were 87.6 males.

The median income for a household in the town was $33,815, and the median income for a family was $43,551. Males had a median income of $29,897 versus $23,313 for females. The per capita income for the town was $17,640. About 6.4% of families and 7.7% of the population were below the poverty line, including 5.9% of those under age 18 and 12.3% of those age 65 or over.

== Education ==
Windsor is served by Mount Ascutney School District, Vermont. The district is home to the Windsor Yellow Jackets and serves grades kindergarten to twelfth. The three schools in the district are the Windsor School and Windsor High School, as well as Albert Bridge School in West Windsor, Vermont.

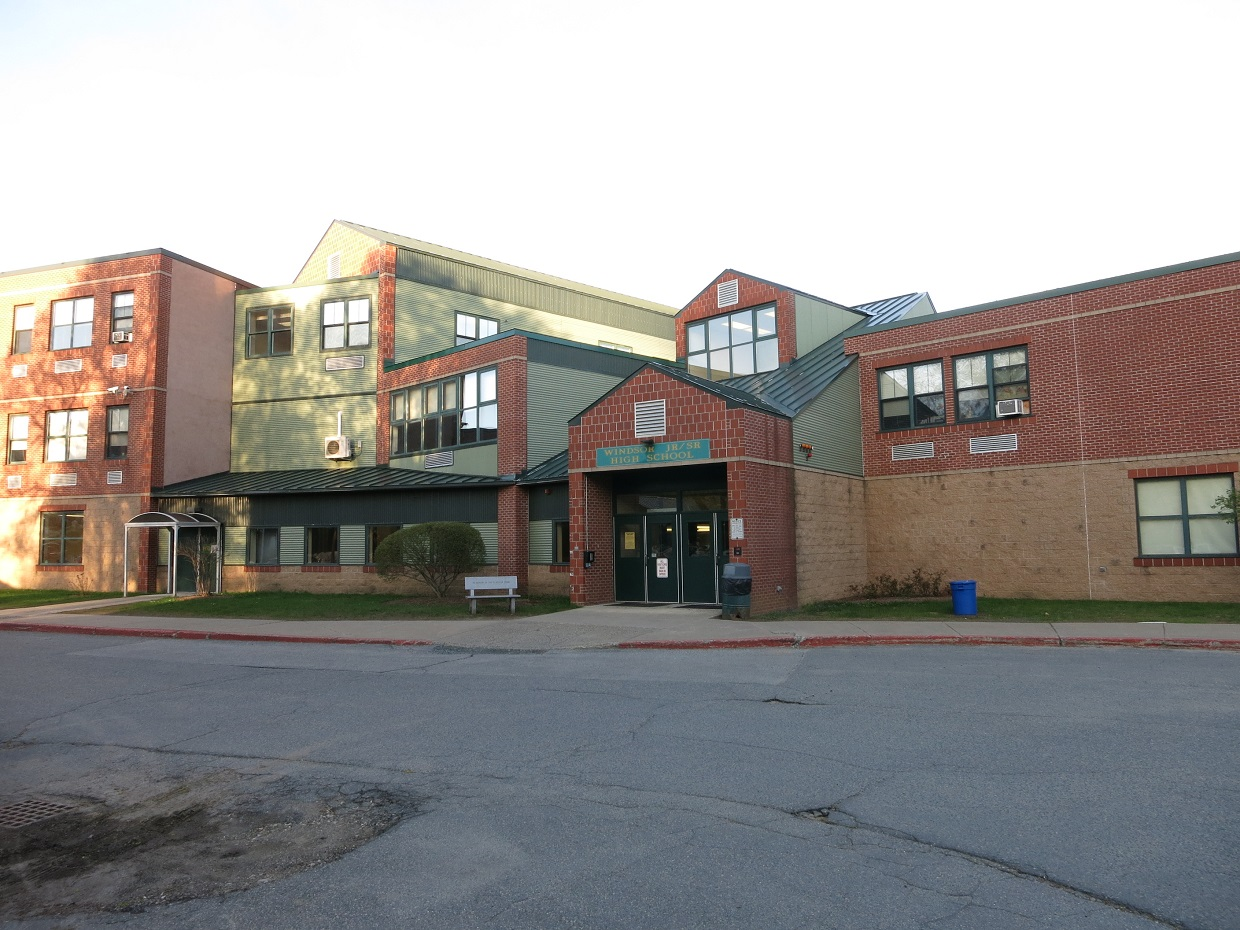
Windsor Jr/Sr High School

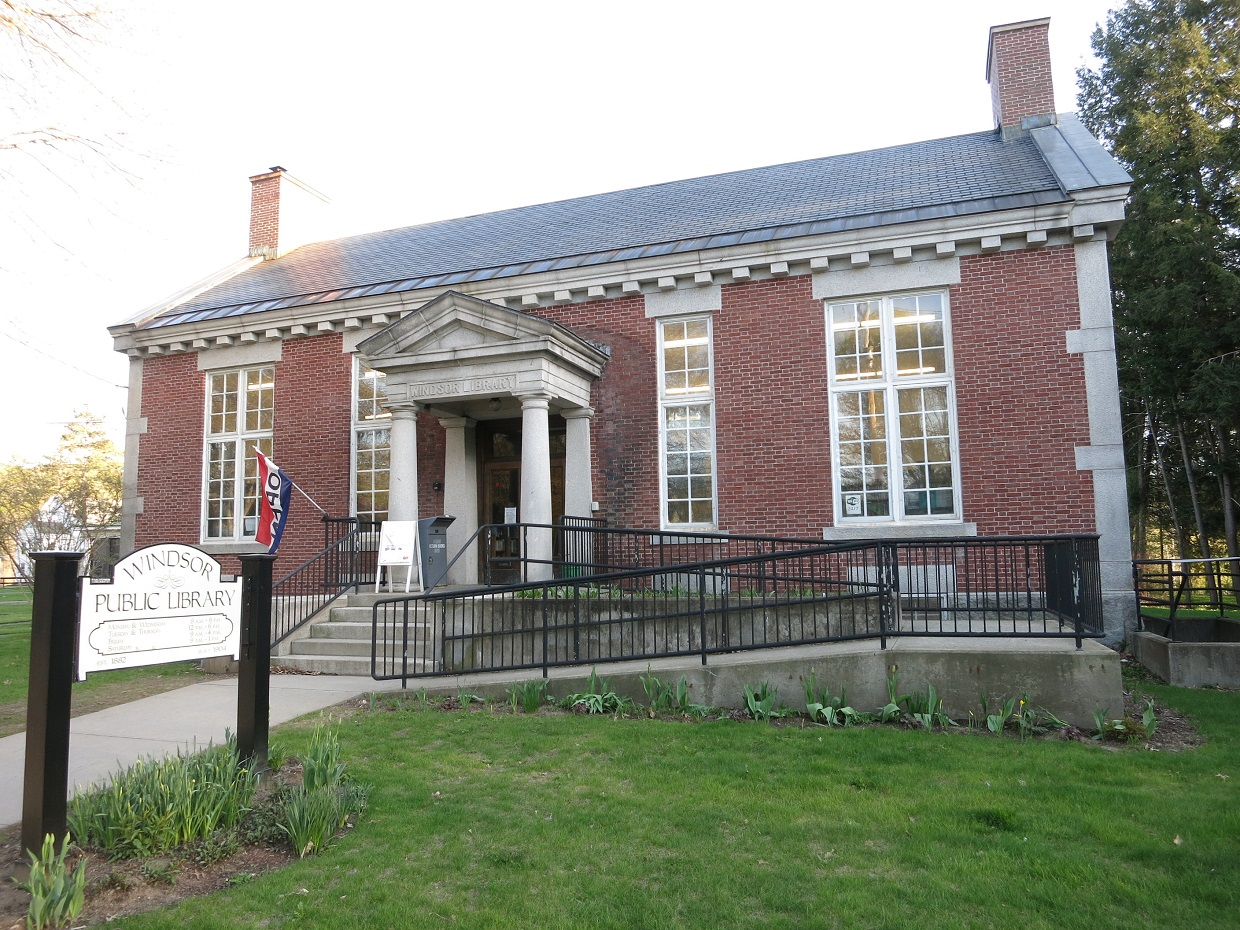
Windsor Public Library on State St.

== Infrastructure ==
=== Health care ===
The Mt. Ascutney Hospital and Health Center is located in Windsor.

=== Transportation ===
Amtrak, the national passenger rail system, provides daily service through Windsor, operating its Vermonter between Washington, D.C., and St. Albans, Vermont.

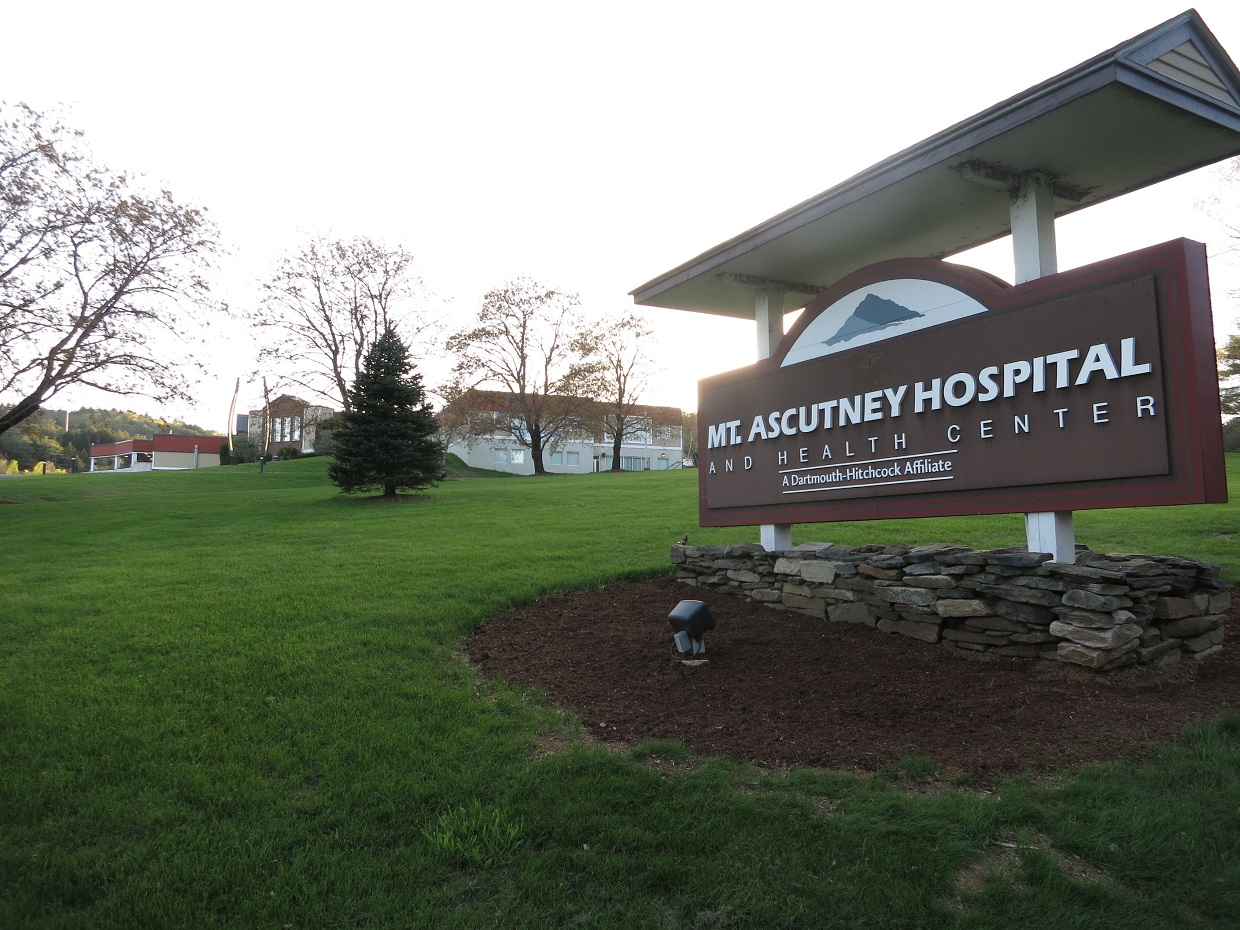
Mt. Ascutney Hospital

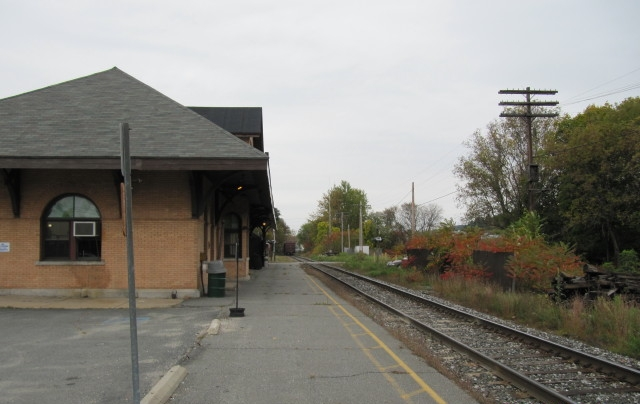
Windsor Amtrak Station

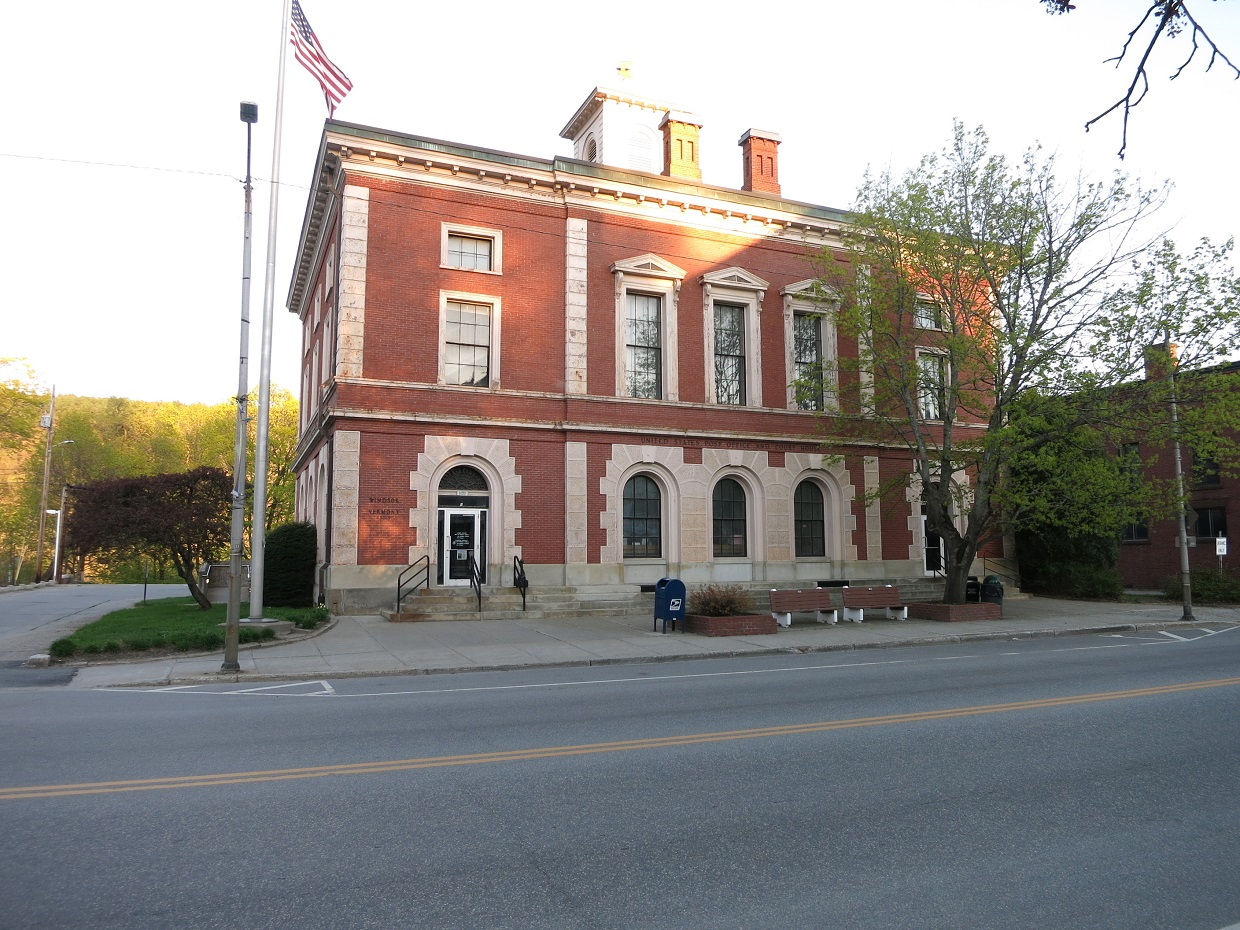
US Post Office on US Route 5

== Culture ==
=== Music ===
Moon Dance Since 1999, Windsor has regularly hosted this Autumn street festival, complete with live bands, magicians, and hypnotists.

=== Parks ===
Windsor is home to Paradise Park in the Windsor Town Forest, which borders Runnemede Lake.

=== Brewery ===
Windsor is also home to the second location of Harpoon Brewery of Boston.

== Notable people ==
- Asa Aikens, Justice of the Vermont Supreme Court
- Rollin Amsden, U.S. Marshal for Vermont
- Asher Benjamin, architect, author, educator
- Carlos Coolidge, politician and distant relative of Calvin Coolidge
- Edward Curtis, politician
- A. E. Douglass, astronomer
- Marie Dressler, stage and screen actress, comedian, and early silent film and Depression-era film star
- Josiah Dunham, Secretary of State of Vermont
- Maxwell Evarts, lawyer, president of the Windsor Savings Bank and founded the State Fair Program in Vermont
- William M. Evarts, United States Attorney General, United States Secretary of State, and U.S. senator for New York
- Horace Everett, US congressman
- William Laurel Harris, educator and arts organizer
- Joseph D. Hatch, Vermont state legislator and mayor of Burlington, Vermont
- Joab Hoisington, one of Windsor's founders, militia leader on the Patriot side in the American Revolution
- Valentine B. Horton, US congressman
- Gurdon Saltonstall Hubbard, fur trader and developer of Chicago
- Jonathan Hatch Hubbard, US congressman
- William Hunter, US congressman
- Stephen Jacob, Justice of the Vermont Supreme Court
- Bob Keeshan, actor and television producer (Captain Kangaroo)
- Thomas Leverett, Secretary of State of Vermont
- Maxwell Perkins, editor
- John Pettes, US Marshal for Vermont
- Matt Salinger, actor
- Stephen William Shaw, artist
- Mark Shepard, state senator
- Nathaniel Simonds, politician
- William H.H. Stowell, US congressman, merchant and industrialist
- John C. Thompson, Justice of the Vermont Supreme Court
- Allen Wardner, prominent banker and businessman who served as Vermont State Treasurer
- Henry D. Washburn, US congressman and general

== See also ==
- List of capitals in the United States#Vermont Republic
- Juniper Hill Farm-Maxwell Evarts House
