= Josiah Dunham =

American politician

Josiah Dunham (April 7, 1769 — May 10, 1844) was an educator, Army officer and politician in Vermont and Kentucky. He was a colonel on the staff of Governor Martin Chittenden during the War of 1812, and served for two years as Secretary of State of Vermont.

== Biography ==
Josiah Dunham was born in Columbia, Connecticut on April 7, 1769. His father was Daniel Dunham, and his mother was Ann Moseley. He graduated from Dartmouth College in 1789, and his classmates included Martin Chittenden, who later served as Governor of Vermont. He resided in Hanover, New Hampshire, and became publisher of the Dartmouth Sentinel newspaper and served as preceptor of Moor's Charity School, an educational facility that was affiliated with Dartmouth College.

Dunham later served in the United States Army, and was a captain before being discharged in 1808. After leaving the Army, Dunham became a resident of Windsor, Vermont, where he became active in politics as a Federalist.

While residing in Windsor, Dunham published a Federalist newspaper, The Washingtonian. From 1813 to 1815 Dunham served as Vermont's Secretary of State.

During the War of 1812, Dunham was a colonel in the Vermont Militia, and was appointed aide-de-camp to Governor Martin Chittenden.

Dunham was principal of the Windsor Female Seminary from 1816 to 1821, when he moved to Kentucky. While residing in Lexington, he founded and served as principal of the Lafayette Female Academy.

Throughout his career, Dunham was a popular speech maker; many of the public addresses he presented at Washington's Birthday celebrations and other events were published as pamphlets.

Dunham died in Lexington on May 10, 1844. He was buried at Lexington Cemetery in Lexington.

== Family ==
In 1796, Dunham married Susan Hedge (1774–1857). Her sister Eleutheria was the wife of Daniel Chipman. Her brother Levi Hedge was a well known professor at Harvard University.

== Sources ==
- Bisbee, Marvin Davis (1900). General Catalogue of Dartmouth College and the Associated Schools 1769-1900. Cambridge, MA: University Press. pp. 121–122.
- Crosby, Nathan (1858). Annual Obituary Notices of Eminent Persons who Have Died in the United States for 1857. Boston, MA: Phillips, Sampson & Company. pp. 133–134.
- Ellis, Harold Milton (July 15, 1915). Joseph Dennie and His Circle. Austin, TX: University of Texas. p. 63.
- Gardner, Charles Kitchell (1853). A Dictionary of All Officers. New York, NY: G. P. Putnam and Company. p. 157.
- Kellogg, Allyn Stanley (1917). Memorials of Elder John White. St. Paul, MN: North Central Publishing. p. 59.
- Moseley, Edward Strong (1878). A Genealogical Sketch of One Branch of the Moseley Family. Newburyport, MA: Newburyport Herald. p. 47.
- Walton, E. P. (1877). Records of the Governor and Council of the State of Vermont. Vol. V. Montpelier, VT: J. & J. M. Poland. p. 503.

Political offices
Preceded by Thomas Leverett	Secretary of State of Vermont; 1813 – 1815	Succeeded by William Slade
