= Haldimand Affair =

Early 1780s series of negotiations

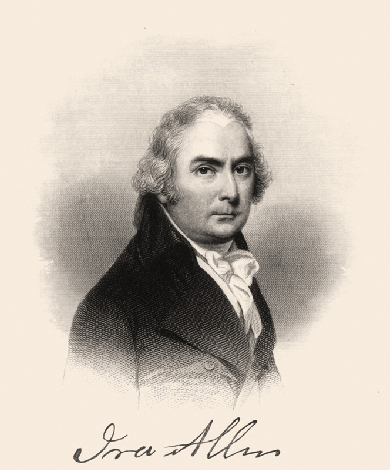
Ira Allen was the principal on the Vermont side.

The Haldimand Affair (also called the Haldimand or Vermont Negotiations) was a series of negotiations conducted in the early 1780s (late in the American Revolutionary War) between Frederick Haldimand, the British governor of the Province of Quebec, his agents, and several people representing the independent Vermont Republic.

Vermonters had been battling Indian raids, sponsored by the British, and engaged in a long-running dispute with New York State over jurisdiction of the territory. At issue was Vermont officially rejoining the British Empire. Just as Haldimand offered generous terms for reunion in 1781, the British army surrendered after the Battle of Yorktown. Vermont, surrounded on three sides by American territory, rejected the British overtures and successfully negotiated terms to enter the United States as the 14th state in March 1791. The secret nature of the negotiations, which excluded significant portions of Vermont's political power structure, has led to accusations of treason against some of the negotiators, notably Ethan Allen.

== Background ==
In 1749, Benning Wentworth, the British provincial governor of New Hampshire, began issuing land grants for territory west of the Connecticut River. This area, now the United States state of Vermont, was also claimed by the Province of New York. In 1764, King George III issued an order-in-council resolving the territorial dispute in favor of New York. New York refused to honor the grants issued by Wentworth, who had persisted in issuing grants even after he had agreed to stop issuing them in light of the territorial dispute. Holders of Wentworth's grants, to validate their claims, were effectively required to repurchase their grants at higher prices from New York, to which the land-rich and cash-poor grantees objected.

Following a pro forma rejection of the Wentworth grants in 1770 by New York's Supreme Court, which included members who held competing New York grants for some of the territory, the area's settlers, led by Ethan Allen and Seth Warner, formed the Green Mountain Boys and organized resistance to attempts by New York to assert control over the area. Using methods that stopped shy of lethal force, the resistance at times forcibly removed New York's judges, land surveyors, and other figures of provincial authorities and disrupted efforts by holders of New York land grants to settle their lands. The incidents were reaching a critical point when the American Revolutionary War broke out in April 1775. General Frederick Haldimand, in command of British military forces in New York City, refused to become involved in the dispute.

Ethan Allen and the Green Mountain Boys captured Fort Ticonderoga in May 1775, and also participated in the invasion later that year of the Province of Quebec. In the latter effort, Allen was captured following a poorly-organized attempt to capture Montreal in September 1775. Allen was held as a prisoner of war by the British until May 1778, when he was exchanged for a British officer. During much of the time, he lived in New York City on parole and was, by his own account, approached in late 1776 by a British officer with an offer to join the British side.

The Wentworth grantholders, led by Ira Allen and Thomas Chittenden, declared independence from New York, establishing the Vermont Republic in July 1777. While there was significant anti-New York sentiment in the territory, there was also significant popular support for the Continental Congress, and the republic's founders regularly petitioned the Congress for admission as the fourteenth state. However, New York and New Hampshire's representatives expressed reservations over its admission until the competing land claims and jurisdictional issues could be resolved and effectively blocked any actions by Congress.

== First contact ==
In 1779, Lord George Germain, the British Secretary of State for the Colonies, instructed General Sir Henry Clinton, the military commander-in-chief in North America, and Haldimand, then serving as governor of Quebec, to open negotiations with the Vermonters over the possibility of establishing Vermont as a separate British province. By 1780 these instructions included detailed offers to convey, including military commissions to Ethan Allen and Thomas Chittenden.

The first documented communication was a letter sent to Ethan Allen in March 1780 by Beverley Robinson, a noted New York Loyalist. Robinson claimed to have heard that many Vermonters still harbored Loyalist sympathies and suggested that the British would support Loyalist regiments raised in the territory. Because of difficulties in infiltrating an agent into Vermont, Allen did not receive the letter until July. On consultation with the Vermont council, Allen made no response to the letter.

Congress took up the subject of the territorial dispute in June but decided to defer discussion until September due to other pressing concerns. While Congress subsequently discussed the issue at length that September, it again postponed taking any sort of action. Chittenden wrote to Congress' president in July, specifically denying that Congress had the right to adjudicate their claims and reserving the right of the Vermont administration to negotiate with the British. In August, Chittenden wrote a letter to Haldimand, offering a truce and parley terms to discuss the exchange of prisoners. Haldimand accepted the offer, and appointed Justus Sherwood, a Loyalist from Vermont who eventually became his spy chief, as his principal negotiator.

== Sherwood in Vermont ==
On September 26, Major Christopher Carleton left Quebec on a raiding expedition into the upper Hudson River valley, causing some alarm in Vermont. Fears in the republic were heightened further by a British raid into its territory in October. Sherwood and a small company of men also left Quebec; these headed up Lake Champlain for Skenesboro (present-day Whitehall, New York). They were eventually met by Vermont militia, and Sherwood was taken to Castleton. There, he met openly with Vermont officials to formally discuss prisoner exchanges and arrange a truce, but he also had a private meeting with Ethan Allen. Sherwood made offers of allegiance to the Crown in the meeting. According to Sherwood's report, Allen countered by demanding Vermont to be made a separate province with its own military command and insisted that negotiations on the subject remain secret and end if Vermont was recognized by Congress as a state.

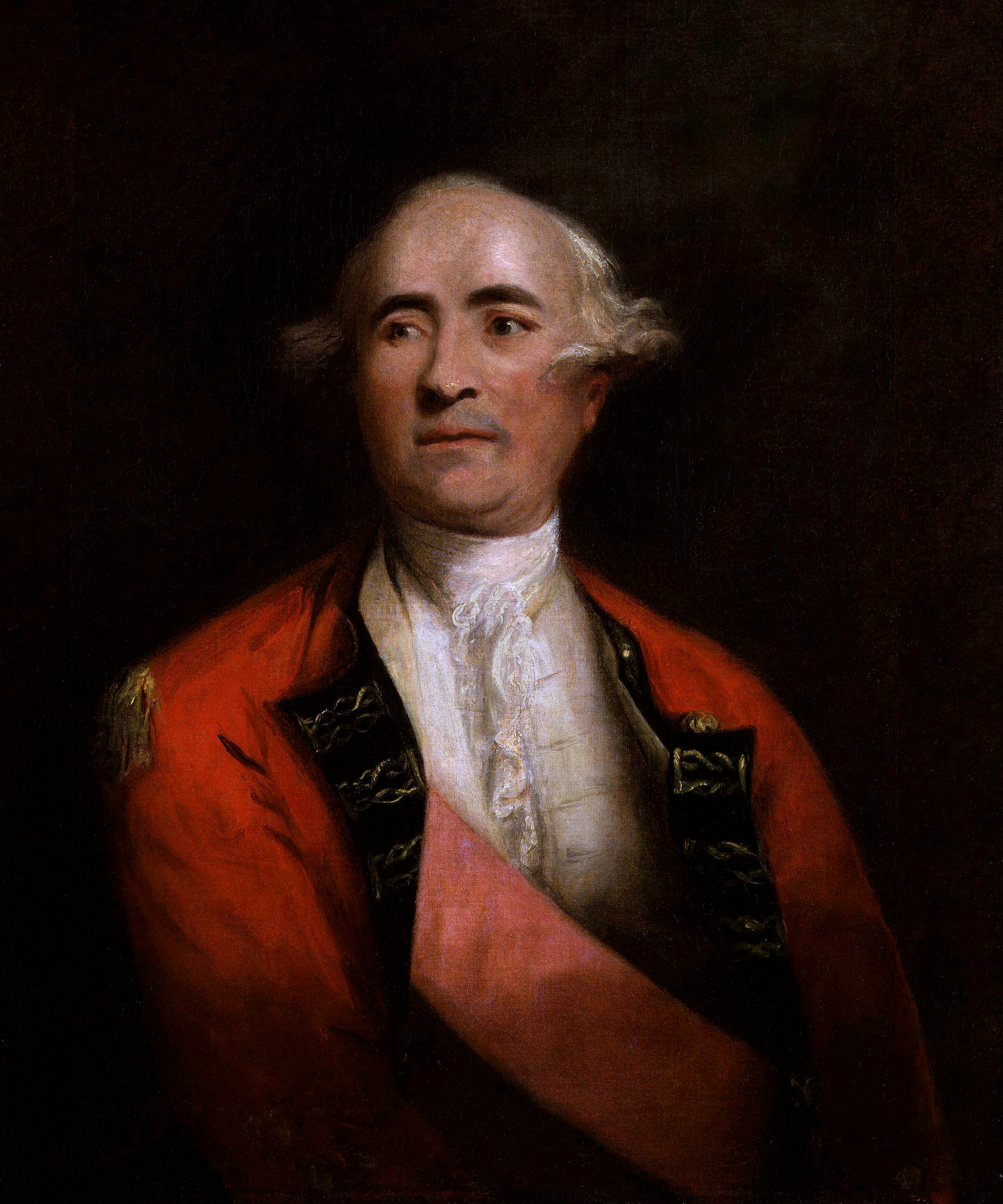
Quebec Governor Frederick Haldimand

While that was going on, word reached Haldimand of the exposure of Benedict Arnold's plot to surrender West Point, the latter's flight to British protection in New York City, and the hanging of Arnold's British co-conspirator, Major John André. As a precaution, Haldimand ordered Carleton, who was preparing to leave Fort Ticonderoga for Quebec, to remain there until Sherwood's safety could be assured. Sherwood returned safely to Quebec in late November.

Following the meetings, Allen rode to Bennington to report to Chittenden and the Vermont legislature. His report to the latter apparently raised more questions than it answered, and suspicious legislators demanded more information. Allen angrily resigned his general's commission and stormed out of the session. While the legislature was able to mollify Allen, Chittenden assigned Allen's brother Ira and Joseph Fay to lead further negotiations with the British. Both met with Sherwood and George Smyth, a Loyalist doctor who had fled north from Albany. Mutually distrustful, with the British wary over the safety of their agents in light of André's hanging, they agreed only for the Vermont representatives to meet with Haldimand that winter. No such meeting took place.

Chittenden wrote to the governors of New Hampshire and Massachusetts, suggesting a united defense against British threats if they relinquished claims to Vermont territory. Massachusetts, with only weak claims to that territory, agreed to give up any claims when Vermont was granted statehood. New York Governor George Clinton turned a more demanding letter from Chittenden over to his legislature in February 1781 and noted that it was "insolent in its nature and derogatory to the honor of this state." The New York Senate, however, expressed concern over the fact that Vermont might ally itself with the British in Quebec and voted, to the shock of Clinton, to send commissioners to Vermont to negotiate the release of its claims. Clinton, threatening to dissolve the legislature, insisted successfully for the idea to be dropped.

New Hampshire's response to Vermont's proposals was complicated by the desire of communities on either side of the Connecticut River to belong to the same state, either Vermont or New Hampshire. A convention of the communities meeting in Charlestown, New Hampshire in January 1781 voted on one day to join New Hampshire and the next, following diplomatic concessions by Ira Allen, to join with Vermont.

== Evasions and acquisitions ==
In February 1781, Beverley Robinson, having received no response from Ethan Allen to his first letter, sent a second letter in which he enclosed a copy of the first. Shortly thereafter, Allen's friend Seth Warner, who still held a colonel's commission in the Continental Army, spoke with him about the ongoing negotiation and his concern that about their potentially treasonous character. In response to ongoing suspicions, Allen sent the letters to Congress, noting that he had never responded to them. Congress, preoccupied with the war, did not deal substantively with the dispute in early 1781.

Also in February 1781, Lord George Germain wrote a letter addressed to Haldimand in which he seemed to assume the alliance was a done (or nearly-done) deal and suggested that Haldimand propose joint British–Vermont actions. The letter was carried aboard a British packet ship that was captured by the French. The letter was delivered to Benjamin Franklin in Paris; he forwarded it to Congress, where it arrived in July. Haldimand, on the other hand, was somewhat pessimistic about the whole affair, writing to Germain, "Ethan Allen is endeavoring to deceive both the Congress and us." When the letter was read in Congress on July 31, it caused an uproar and cries of treason.

The often-delayed plan for British and Vermont representatives finally took place in May 1781 The details of this meeting, which ran from May 7 to 25 and took place at the British fort on Ile-aux-Noix, are primarily recounted from the writings of Justus Sherwood. He found Ira Allen, the principal negotiator for Vermont, to be evasive and extremely wary. Allen refused to sign any sort of preliminary agreement, claiming that although Vermont's leaders were disposed toward the idea, the populace was not, and it would have to be convinced first. On May 11, Sherwood wrote, "My opinion corroborates with the Major's that Mr. Allen's errand here is to prolong the time and if possible to alarm Congress into a compliance with their demands." He also felt that Vermont's large landowners, which included the Allens and Chittenden, might be looking more to their own interests than to those of the people of Vermont. The meeting ended with an oral agreement in which the British promised to not conduct further hostilities against Vermont, and the Vermont authorities would prepare the people for reunion and try to convince the assembly to appoint commissioners to negotiate an alliance when it met in June.

The promises Allen made were never fulfilled since the Vermont assembly appointed no commissioners. To annoy its neighbors, it voted in the June meeting to extend its borders to the east and west, by adopting New Hampshire towns along the Connecticut River, and some New York towns east of the Hudson. The territories became bargaining chips for Vermont's negotiations with Congress. To delay matters with the British, Ira Allen wrote to Haldimand in July, indicating that Vermont was sending representatives to negotiate with Congress, and that public opinion in Vermont would be more favorable once Congress rejected their terms or deferred discussions again. Chittenden also wrote to Haldimand in July, indicating that George Washington was unwilling to release back to him British prisoners that had been captured in Vermont. Justus Sherwood met with Joseph Fay for two weeks in July, with a fruitless outcome that did nothing to relieve British concerns that Vermont's delays were intentional.

=== Local suspicions and further evasion ===
When the Vermont assembly met in August, rumors were swirling about the negotiations, and the assembly insisted on seeing papers relating to them. In response, Ira Allen produced letters that had been exchanged concerning the prisoner exchanges that were the cover for the meetings. Around the same time, Allen extracted from the council the following statement: "[Allen] had used his best policy by feigning or endeavoring to make them [the British] believe that the State of Vermont had a desire to negotiate a treaty of peace with Great Britain – thereby to prevent the immediate invasion [of Vermont].... We... think it a necessary political maneuver to save the frontiers of this state."

Congress also took up the subject of Vermont statehood in August 1781. On August 21, it approved a proposal in which statehood for Vermont would be considered if Vermont relinquished all of its claims east of the Connecticut River and west of the western border of Massachusetts.

In September, Justus Sherwood met again with Joseph Fay and Ira Allen at Skenesboro (present-day Whitehall, New York). Allen suggested that since the Vermont assembly had changed, it would take some time to adjust. He suggested to Sherwood for Haldimand to prepare a proclamation announcing Vermont's new status. The proclamation would be presented to the Vermont assembly after it had discussed and rejected the latest offer from Congress.

Sherwood suggested that a lack of definite action on the part of the assembly might lead to British military action. The threat was followed up with the movement of British troops under the command of Barry St. Leger to occupy Fort Ticonderoga in October that was timed to coincide with the next meeting of the assembly but sent with the expectation that they would be welcomed into Vermont. Sherwood reported after the meeting his opinion that as much as a third of the Vermont population was unhappy with the rule of Chittenden and the Allens and was in favor of a change of government.

== Crisis ==
When St. Leger arrived at Ticonderoga, Vermont militia under Roger Enos were arrayed across the lake to observe them. St. Leger was instructed to treat any Vermonters encountered by his men in a friendly manner. During a scouting expedition, a company of St. Leger's men killed one Vermont militiaman, Sgt. Archelaus Tupper, and captured five more. Horrified at what happened, St. Leger wrote a letter of apology that unintentionally divulged aspects of the conspiracy. Enos forwarded the letter to the assembly, using as a messenger someone who had long harbored suspicions about the actions of the Allen clan. In addition to delivering the letter, he broadcast his suspicions far and wide. A crowd gathered at the assembly, demanding answers from Ira Allen. He demurred, claiming that Chittenden, who was not present at the time, was in possession of the relevant papers and would deliver them. A series of more innocuously-worded dispatches was then forged by Nathaniel Chipman and delivered to the assembly to satisfy its demands for information.

The assembly considered the offer put forward by Congress and rejected it on October 16, but it agreed to consider negotiations over its boundaries. Pro-British factions in Vermont had not done well in the election, and news of a French naval victory on the Chesapeake had dampened Loyalist sentiment. By mid-November news of Charles Cornwallis's surrender of his army at Yorktown arrived, and St. Leger returned to Quebec. Haldimand, who believed that the negotiations were conducted in good faith, and some Vermonters continued to correspond through the winter, but with the British in a weak position, and Vermont in a position that appeared strong, nothing of substance came of the exchange.

== Agreements and complications ==
In 1782, the fractious nature of Vermont's internal politics became a problem for the republic's quest for statehood. The southeast corner of the republic (now Brattleboro and the surrounding area) harbored strong political support for rejoining New York. In January, the "east side Yorkers" made another in a series of petitions to Governor Clinton and the Congress, complaining in part about the ongoing "intrigue with Canada." This led Clinton to call a special meeting of the New York assembly to discuss the "dangerous intercourse" going on between Vermont and the British, in which they decided to forward papers on the matter to Congress, and move to enforce the state's authority over the territory.

Chittenden also received a letter from George Washington in January, who wrote that he supported statehood for Vermont if it adhered to its original boundaries. He also indicated his opinion that its statehood was a virtual certainty, with only details to be negotiated. When Vermont's assembly had the letter read in February, it agreed to accept the boundaries proposed by Congress in August 1781. In response, Congress voted on March 1 to consider Vermont's statehood if, within 30 days, Vermont returned full control over the towns it previously claimed to New York and New Hampshire authority. Vermont did so and notified Congress on March 31 that it had done so. Congress then began consideration of a statehood resolution but tabled it without further action on April 17. It may have been influenced by the publication that month of correspondence between Haldimand and Sir Henry Clinton on the matter by a New York newspaper. Publication of the letters led Governor Clinton to comment negatively on the "traitorous correspondence between the leaders of the New Hampshire Grants and the enemy."

In spite of the negative publicity, New York's assembly in April passed a bill pardoning the New Hampshire grantees of offenses they may have committed and recognizing, without requiring additional payment, the New Hampshire grants and those issued later by the Vermont Republic. That appeared to clear the significant legal roadblocks to Vermont's statehood, but the east side Yorkers continued to be a persistent problem, and Governor Clinton almost encouraged them to engage in acts of resistance against the Vermont administration and even issued commissions for New York judicial positions covering the affected area. The situation got bad enough that Ethan Allen, in some secrecy, raised 250 men and marched on the town of Guilford, the epicenter of Yorker activity. That resulted in the arrest, trial, and banishment of the Yorker ringleaders in October 1782 and the seizure of some of their property. That prompted Congress to demand for Vermont to compensate the affected individuals.

Meanwhile, correspondence continued with Haldimand in Quebec, particularly by Ethan Allen. In June, Allen wrote, "I shall do everything in my power to render this state a British province", and made additional scathing commentary on the Congress. However, the ongoing peace negotiations to end the war put a damper on the communications, which finally ended in late 1783.

== Statehood ==
The state flag of Vermont

With the end of the war, the subject of Vermont's statehood remained stalemated in spite of the basic agreement on boundaries. The urge for statehood subsided for a time in Vermont, as it was not burdened by the debts of the war. (In fact, the Vermont government profited from the sale of the lands seized from Loyalists.)

The subject was finally raised again in 1789 when the new US Constitution came into force. Vermont's leadership was favorably disposed to it, and in the summer of 1790 negotiated terms with New York over their shared border and agreed to pay $30,000 in compensation for land grants issued by New York. A Vermont convention voted by an overwhelming landslide in favor of a petition for statehood on January 6, 1791. US President George Washington presented the petition to the United States Congress on February 9, and signed the passed legislation on February 18, making Vermont the first new state to join the Union formed by the original thirteen, as of March 4. Vermont celebrated its statehood in Rutland on March 8, 1791.

== In popular culture ==
The novel The Green Cockade (an abridgment of 1949's Catch a Falling Star) by Frederic Franklyn Van de Water depicts the Haldimand Affair along with other activity in Vermont during the Revolutionary War. It portrays the negotiations as being driven by a small group of Vermonters led by Ira Allen in an effort to keep the Revolutionary War away from Vermont.
