= Secretary of State of Vermont =

Cabinet officer in US state of Vermont

- Great Seal of the State of Vermont

- bFlag of the State of Vermont

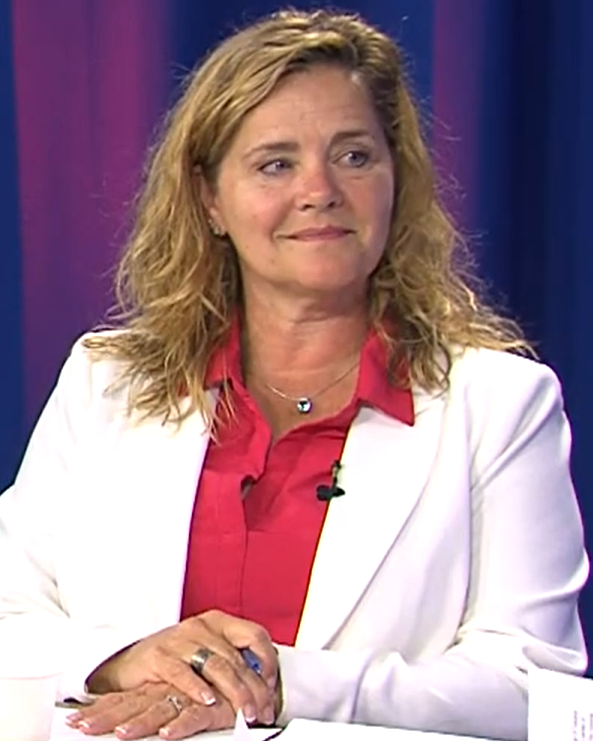
- Incumbent; Sarah Copeland-Hanzas since 2023
- Type: Secretary of State
- Seat: 128 State St., Montpelier, Vermont
- Term length: 2 years
- Formation: 1778
- First holder: Thomas Chandler Jr.
- Website: Vermont Secretary of State

The secretary of state of Vermont is one of five cabinet-level constitutional officers in the U.S. state of Vermont which are elected every two years. The secretary of state is fourth (behind the lieutenant governor, speaker of the House of Representatives, president pro tempore of the Senate, respectively) in the line of succession to the office of Governor of Vermont. The Office of the Secretary of State is located at 128 State St. in Montpelier. Since 2023, the secretary of state has been Sarah Copeland-Hanzas, a Democrat.

== Responsibilities ==
The agency, headed by the Vermont secretary of state, manages several divisions and departments including:

- The State Archives Division is charged with preserving and keeping accessible all state records. The State Archives preserve documents going back to the state's founding as the Vermont Republic in 1777.
- The Office of Professional Regulations licenses and regulates 39 professional occupations to protect the state's citizens from incompetent, unethical, and unprofessional behavior.
- The Elections Divisions administers Vermont's elections, works to protect the integrity of the democratic process, registers voters, coordinates administration of the Voter's Oath, oversees campaign finance reporting, and implements Vermont's lobbyist disclosure laws.
- The Corporations Division registers business entities and is the filing repository for Uniform Commercial Code filings for the state of Vermont.
- The Notary Resource Center oversees Vermont's notaries public.

The Secretary of State's Office is also responsible for the filing and publication of administrative rules by all state agencies.

The office of Secretary of State pre-dates Vermont statehood in 1791. Prior to 1884 the Secretary of State was chosen in a vote of the Vermont General Assembly. The first secretary of state chosen by the voters of the state was Charles W. Porter.

== List of Vermont secretaries of state ==
Vermont's secretaries of state since 1778 include:

#	Secretary of State	Picture	Term	Party
1	Thomas Chandler Jr.		1778	No party affiliation
2	Joseph Fay		1778–1781	No party affiliation
3	Micah Townshend		1781–1788	No party affiliation
4	Roswell Hopkins		1788–1802	Federalist Party
5	David Wing Jr.		1802–1806	Federalist Party
6	Thomas Leverett		1806–1813	Democratic-Republican Party
7	Josiah Dunham		1813–1815	Federalist Party
8	William Slade Jr.		1815–1823	Democratic-Republican Party
9	Norman Williams		1823–1831	National Republican
10	Timothy Merrill		1831–1836	Anti-Masonic
11	Chauncey L. Knapp		1836–1841	Anti-Masonic
12	Alvah Sabin		1841–1842	Whig
13	James McMillan Shafter		1842–1849	Whig
14	Ferrand F. Merrill		1849–1853	Whig
15	Daniel Pierce Thompson		1853–1855	Liberty (Whig affiliated)
16	Charles W. Willard		1855–1857	Republican
17	Benjamin W. Dean		1857–1861	Republican
18	George W. Bailey Jr.		1861–1865	Republican
19	George Nichols		1865–1884	Republican
20	Charles W. Porter		1884–1890	Republican
21	Chauncey W. Brownell		1890–1898	Republican
22	Fred A. Howland		1898–1902	Republican
23	Frederick G. Fleetwood		1902–1908	Republican
24	Guy W. Bailey		1908–1917	Republican
25	Frederick G. Fleetwood		1917–1919	Republican
26	Harry A. Black		1919–1923	Republican
27	Aaron H. Grout		1923–1927	Republican
28	Rawson C. Myrick		1927–1947	Republican
29	Helen Burbank		1947–1949	Republican
30	Howard E. Armstrong		1949–1965	Republican
31	Harry H. Cooley		1965–1969	Democratic
32	Richard C. Thomas		1969–1977	Republican
33	James A. Guest		1977–1981	Democratic
34	James H. Douglas		1981–1993	Republican
35	Donald M. Hooper		1993–1995	Democratic
36	James F. Milne		1995–1999	Republican
37	Deborah Markowitz		1999–2011	Democratic
38	James C. Condos		2011–2023	Democratic
39	Sarah Copeland-Hanzas		2023–present	Democratic

== See also ==
- List of company registers
