= Yorker (Vermont) =

During the dispute over the status of Vermont in the 1770s and 1780s, a Yorker was any inhabitant of Vermont who took the position that Vermont was by rights a part of the state of New York, against the position that Vermont was entitled to the de facto independence that it had after January 15, 1777. Under Vermont law, Yorkers and Loyalists were traitors to Vermont, subject to forfeiture of all property and banishment from Vermont.
