= Voter's oath or affirmation =

Citizen's oath or affirmation in the state of Vermont

The voter's oath or affirmation, formerly the freemen's oath, is a citizen's oath or affirmation taken during voter registration in the U.S. state of Vermont. In 2007, the law was amended to make it easier to administer this oath or affirmation; instead of being administered only by notaries public and similar officials, the oath may be administered by nearly anyone, including the applicant. ("Voter's oath or affirmation; how administered" 2007)

The Freemen's Oath was a part of the 1777 Constitution of the Vermont Republic, the first constitution in the Western Hemisphere to grant universal suffrage to all white men and free black men, regardless of property ownership. Several of the American colonies used a Freemen's Oath. Until the early twentieth century all official state commissions and certificates were headed by the words "BY THE FREEMEN OF VERMONT."

== Freemen's Oath ==
The original oath read as follows:

§ 42. Voter's qualifications and oaths
Every man of the full age of twenty-one years who is a citizen of Vermont, having resided in this State for the period established by the General Assembly and who is of a quiet and peaceable behavior, and will take the following oath or affirmation, shall be entitled to all the privileges of a voter of this state:

You solemnly swear (or affirm) that whenever you give your vote or suffrage, touching any matter that concerns the state of Vermont, you will do it so as in your conscience you shall judge will most conduce to the best good of the same, as established by the Constitution, without fear or favor of any man.

=== Oath as revised with inclusive language ===
In November 2002, the Vermont General Assembly amended the language of the oath to reflect the inclusion of women. The oath was retitled the "Voter's Oath." The text of the revised oath reads:

§ 42. Voter's qualifications and oaths
Every person of the full age of eighteen years who is a citizen of the United States, having resided in this State for the period established by the General Assembly and who is of a quiet and peaceable behavior, and will take the following oath or affirmation, shall be entitled to all the privileges of a voter of this state:

You solemnly swear (or affirm) that whenever you give your vote or suffrage, touching any matter that concerns the State of Vermont, you will do it so as in your conscience you shall judge will most conduce to the best good of the same, as established by the Constitution, without fear or favor of any person.

Vermont, Alabama, and Florida are the only U.S. states with a voter's oath.

== Sources ==
- The Constitution of the State of Vermont: a Facsimile Copy of the 1777 Original. The Vermont Historical Society: 1977.
- "Voter's oath or affirmation; how administered" [17 V. S. A. 2124] Vermont General Assembly (2007).
