= Harper =

Harper may refer to:

== Names ==
- Harper (name), a surname and given name

== Places ==
in Canada

- Harper Islands, Nunavut
- Harper, Prince Edward Island

In the United States

- Harper, former name of Costa Mesa, California in Orange County
- Harper, Illinois
- Harper, Iowa
- Harper, Kansas
- Harper, Kentucky
- Harper, Missouri
- Harper, Logan County, Ohio
- Harper, Ross County, Ohio
- Harper, Oregon
- Harper, Texas
- Harper, Utah
- Harper, Washington
- Harper, Wyoming

Elsewhere

- Harper, Liberia
- Harper River in Canterbury, New Zealand
- Harper Adams University, Shropshire, United Kingdom.

== Court cases ==
- Harper v. Virginia Board of Elections, 383 U.S. 663 (1966), overruling Breedlove v. Suttles, 302 U.S. 277 (1937)

== Other uses ==
- Harper, a harp player
- Harper (film), a 1966 film starring Paul Newman and Lauren Bacall
- Harper (publisher), an American publishing house, the imprint of global publisher HarperCollins
- Harper College, a community college in Palatine, Illinois, USA
- Short name for harper by Harper's Bazaar
- Harper (Forgotten Realms), a member of a fictional semi-secret organization

== See also ==
- Harper County (disambiguation)
- Harper Road (disambiguation)
- Harper Township (disambiguation)
- Harpers (disambiguation)
- Harper's (disambiguation)
- Harpers Ferry (disambiguation)
- Harp (disambiguation)
- Happer (disambiguation)
