= Harper's (disambiguation) =

Harper's most commonly refers to Harper's Magazine, an American monthly general-interest publication.

Harper's may also refer to:

== Publications ==
- Harper's Bazaar, an American fashion magazine
- Harpers Wine & Spirit, a British wine and spirits industry magazine
- Harper's Weekly, an 1857–1916 American political magazine
- Harper's Encyclopedia of United States History

== Other uses ==
- Harper & Brothers, a publishing company
- Harper's Island, a television series
- Harpers Bizarre, a musical group

== See also ==
- Harper (disambiguation)
- Harpers (disambiguation)
