= Battle of Longue-Pointe =

Battle of the American Revolutionary War

- Part of the American Revolutionary War
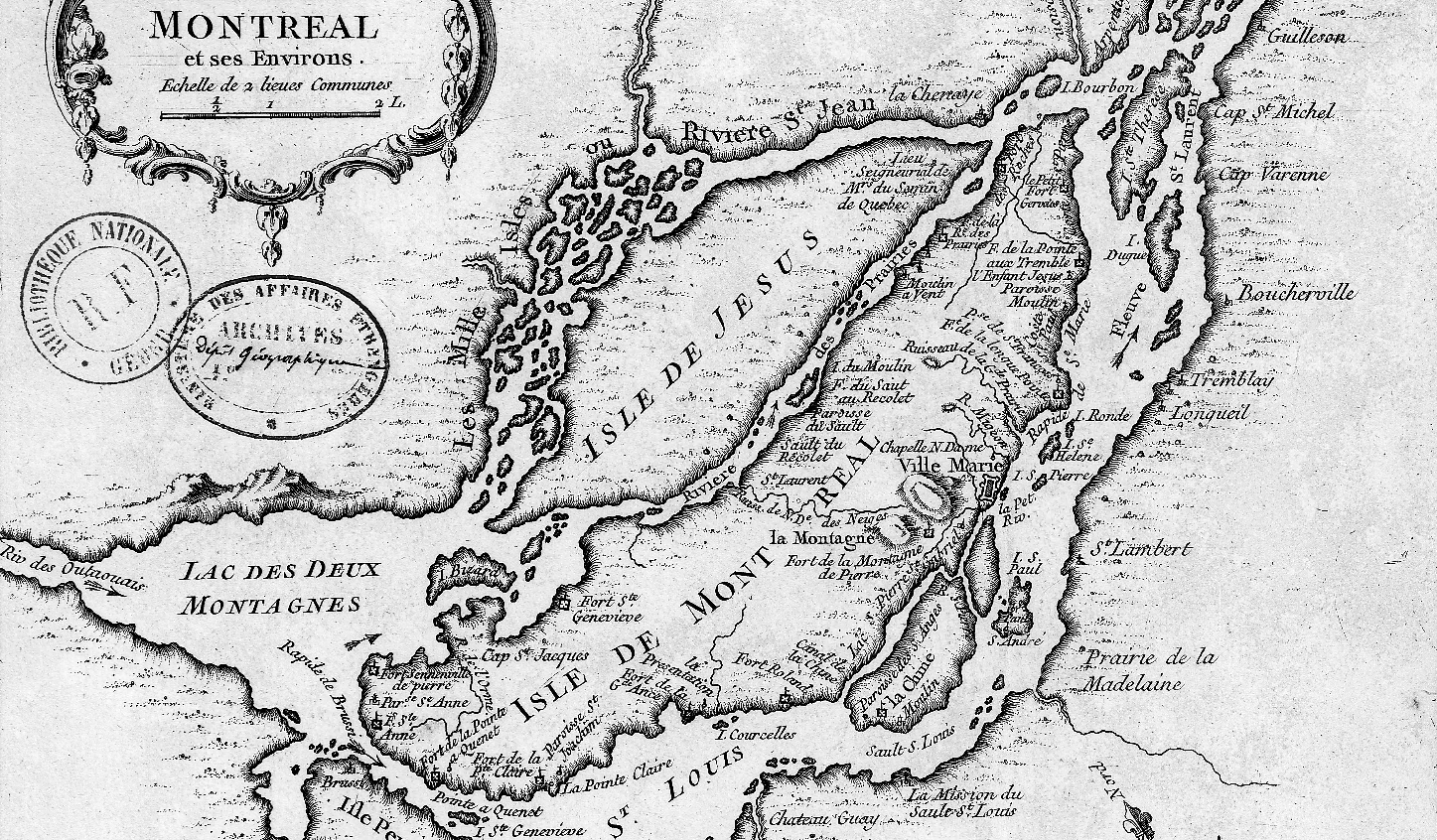
- The Isle of Montreal in 1764. Longue Pointe is opposite Longueuil, which is on the right side of the map.
Date	September 25, 1775
Location	Montreal, Quebec 45°33′45″N 73°31′51″W
Result	British victory

Belligerents
(United States) United Colonies	Great Britain: Province of Quebec

Commanders and leaders
Ethan Allen (POW)	Guy Carleton; John Campbell

Strength
37 Americans; 60 Canadians	34 regulars 80 British militia 120 Canadian militia 20 Indian agents A few natives

Casualties and losses
6 killed 10 wounded 20 Americans, 11 Canadians surrendered Remaining force scattered	5–8 casualties

The Battle of Longue-Pointe (French: Bataille de Longue-Pointe) was an attempt by Ethan Allen and a small force of American and Quebec militia to capture Montreal from British forces on September 25, 1775, early in the American Revolutionary War. Allen, who had been instructed only to raise militia forces among the local inhabitants, had long had thoughts of taking the lightly defended city. When he reached the southern shore of the St. Lawrence River with about 110 men, he seized the opportunity to try. Major John Brown, whom Allen claimed was supposed to provide additional forces, did not appear as they had planned, isolating Allen and his men on the north side of the river.

British General Guy Carleton sent a force composed mostly of Quebec militia in response to news of Allen's crossing of the St. Lawrence. This force cut off Allen's escape route, and eventually surrounded and captured Allen and a number of his men. Carleton eventually abandoned Montreal, which fell without battle to Continental Army forces on November 13. Allen was sent first to England and then New York City as a prisoner, and was eventually exchanged in 1778.

== Background ==
In the 18th century, the city of Montreal occupied only a small portion of the island of Montreal, centered on what is now called Old Montreal. The eastern tip of the island was called Longue-Pointe, and there was at one time a fortification called Fort Longue Pointe on the island, across the river from Longueuil. This area, annexed to Montreal in 1910, and now the Mercier-Est neighborhood of Mercier-Hochelaga-Maisonneuve, a borough of the city, is near where the action described here took place.

With the American Revolutionary War beginning, many thought it would be easy to spread the rebellion to the Province of Quebec, which had only been ceded to the British in 1763, and whose population was seen as resentful of British rule. The American invasion of Quebec began with the arrival at Île aux Noix of the Continental Army under the command of General Philip Schuyler on September 4, 1775. Schuyler, who was ill at the time, eventually turned command of the army over to General Richard Montgomery, who ordered the army to besiege Fort Saint-Jean, which they did on September 18. At this fort, south of Montreal on the Richelieu River, General Guy Carleton had concentrated the few British regulars at his disposal following the capture of Fort Ticonderoga in May.

=== American situation ===
Before turning command over to Montgomery, Schuyler drafted a proclamation addressed to the people of Quebec, encouraging them to oppose the British and assist the American cause. On September 8 Ethan Allen and Major John Brown went into the countryside between Saint-Jean and Montreal with a small detachment of Americans to circulate this proclamation, meeting with James Livingston, a Patriot sympathizer at Chambly as well as with the local Caughnawaga Mohawk. Livingston eventually raised about 300 local militia, which he encamped at Pointe-Olivier, below Fort Chambly. Allen and Brown returned to Île aux Noix following this tour.

Allen had long harboured the goal of taking Montreal. After he and Benedict Arnold captured Fort Ticonderoga in May 1775, he had taken a few hundred men north from Ticonderoga to Saint-Jean with the idea of capturing the fort there by surprise, and then taking Montreal. This effort was frustrated by the timely arrival of British troops at Saint-Jean; the exploit made Allen a well-known figure in Montreal and the Richelieu valley.

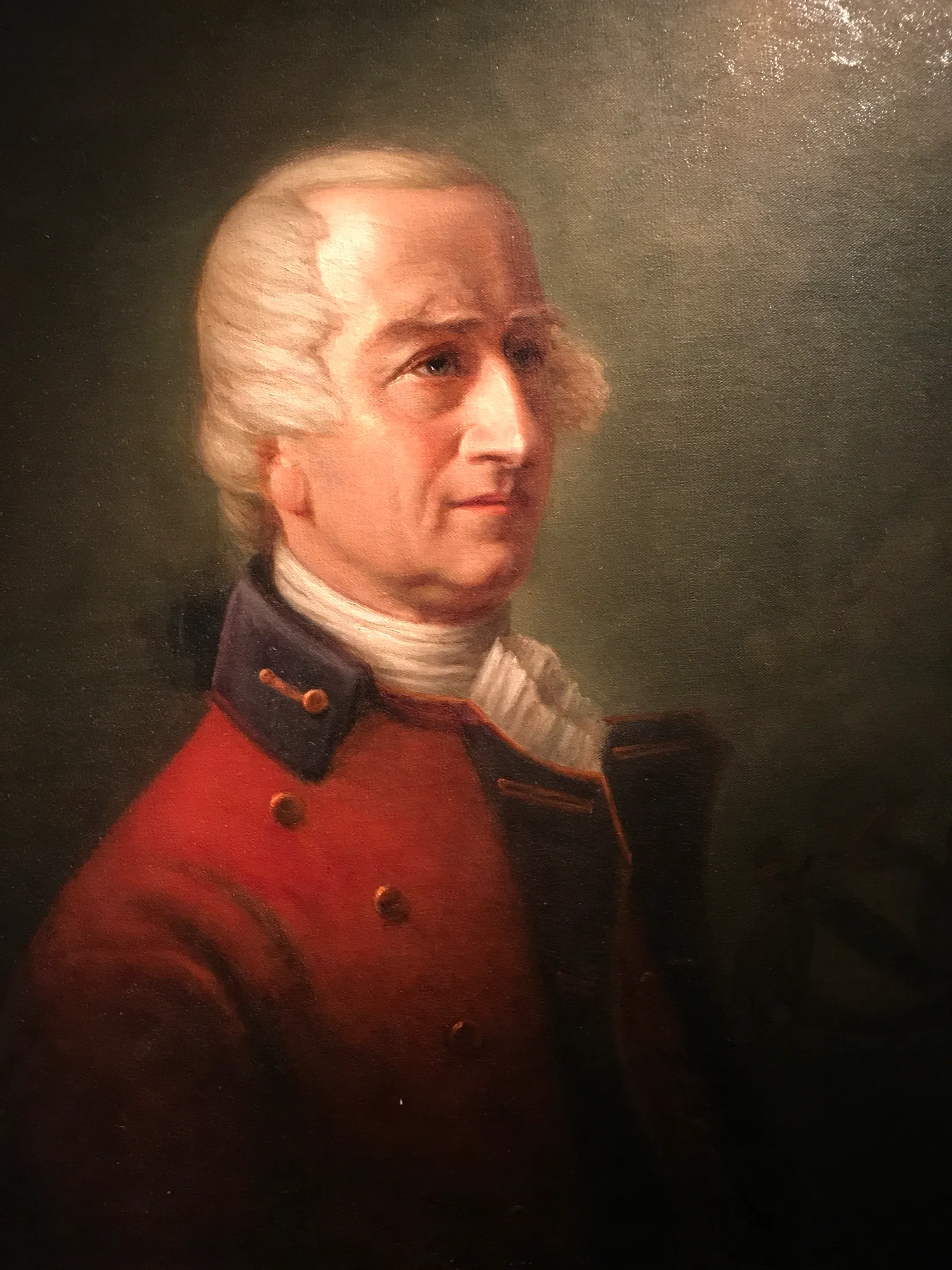
General Guy Carleton

=== Montreal situation ===
Following the capture of Fort Ticonderoga in May 1775, General Carleton, with only 800 regular troops available to defend the entire province, had concentrated those troops at Fort Saint-Jean, placing about 500 troops, along with about 250 militia and natives, at the fort. The remaining forces were distributed among the frontier forts along the Great Lakes, with relatively small garrisons at Montreal, Trois-Rivières, and Quebec City. During the summer of 1775 he attempted to raise substantial additional militia forces from the population. These attempts met with limited success, in part because of successful American propaganda and agitation by Patriot sympathizers, especially Thomas Walker, James Price, and James Livingston. By July, Carleton was apparently satisfied with the level of militia support near Montreal, but he did little to stop the activities of the agitators, who also sent reports detailing British military preparations to the Americans.

== Prelude ==
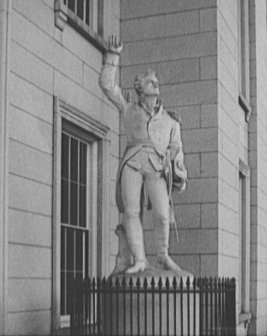
A 1904 photograph of the Ethan Allen statue in Montpelier, Vermont

When Montgomery finally began the siege of Fort Saint-Jean, he ordered Allen and about 30 Americans to join with Livingston's Canadians to secure the south bank of the St. Lawrence River against attempts by Carleton in Montreal to relieve the siege. He also ordered a larger force under Brown's command to secure the area north of the fort, and to cover the road between Saint-Jean and Montreal.

Allen traveled along the southeastern banks of the Richelieu River, up to Sorel, where he crossed that river and continued up the southern shore of the St. Lawrence to Longueuil. According to Allen's account, he met Brown there, and the two of them then hatched a plan to attack Montreal. Brown would cross the river with 200 men at La Prairie, upriver from Montreal, and Allen, with his Americans and 80 Canadians under the command of Loiseau and Duggan, two of Livingston's captains, would cross the river at Longueuil, below the city, and the two forces would, after a prearranged signal, converge on the city itself.

== Action ==
Allen and his men crossed the St. Lawrence on the night of the 24th, landing at Longue-Pointe. The inhabitants he met there were friendly, but he posted guards on the road to Montreal to prevent news of their crossing from reaching the city. However, one man they detained managed to escape to the city and inform Carleton of Allen's presence on the island. Brown did not cross the river. While no sources indicate why Brown failed to act, historian Justin Smith suggests that Allen in fact acted alone, and only later sought to blame Brown for the endeavour's failure. This left Allen's force alone and vulnerable, as it had taken three round trips with the available boats to ferry his men across the river.

Realizing he would not be able ferry everyone back across the river before troops arrived from the city, Allen chose a wooded area near the Ruisseau-des-Sœurs (labelled on the map above as Ruisseau de la G^{de} Prairie), between Longue-Pointe and Montreal, to make a stand. He also sent word to Thomas Walker, a British merchant and known Patriot sympathizer with a house in nearby L'Assomption, for assistance. Walker was able to muster some men, but Allen was captured before they could lend any assistance.

When General Carleton received word that the notorious Ethan Allen was at the gates of the city, he raised the alarm. As the news spread, large numbers of people turned out. Captain John Campbell assembled a force of 34 regulars from the 26th Foot (the entire garrison in Montreal), 120 Canadien and 80 English militia, 20 British Indian agents, and a few Indians, and led them out to face Allen's force. As Campbell's force approached, Allen instructed 10 Canadians to cover his left flank, while Duggan and another 50 Canadians were placed on the right flank. Both of these detachments fled instead of holding their positions, leaving Allen with about 50 men. Over the course of the next 90 minutes, fire was exchanged between the forces. Allen's remaining forces were eventually broken, and, after trying to outrun the enemy, he surrendered.

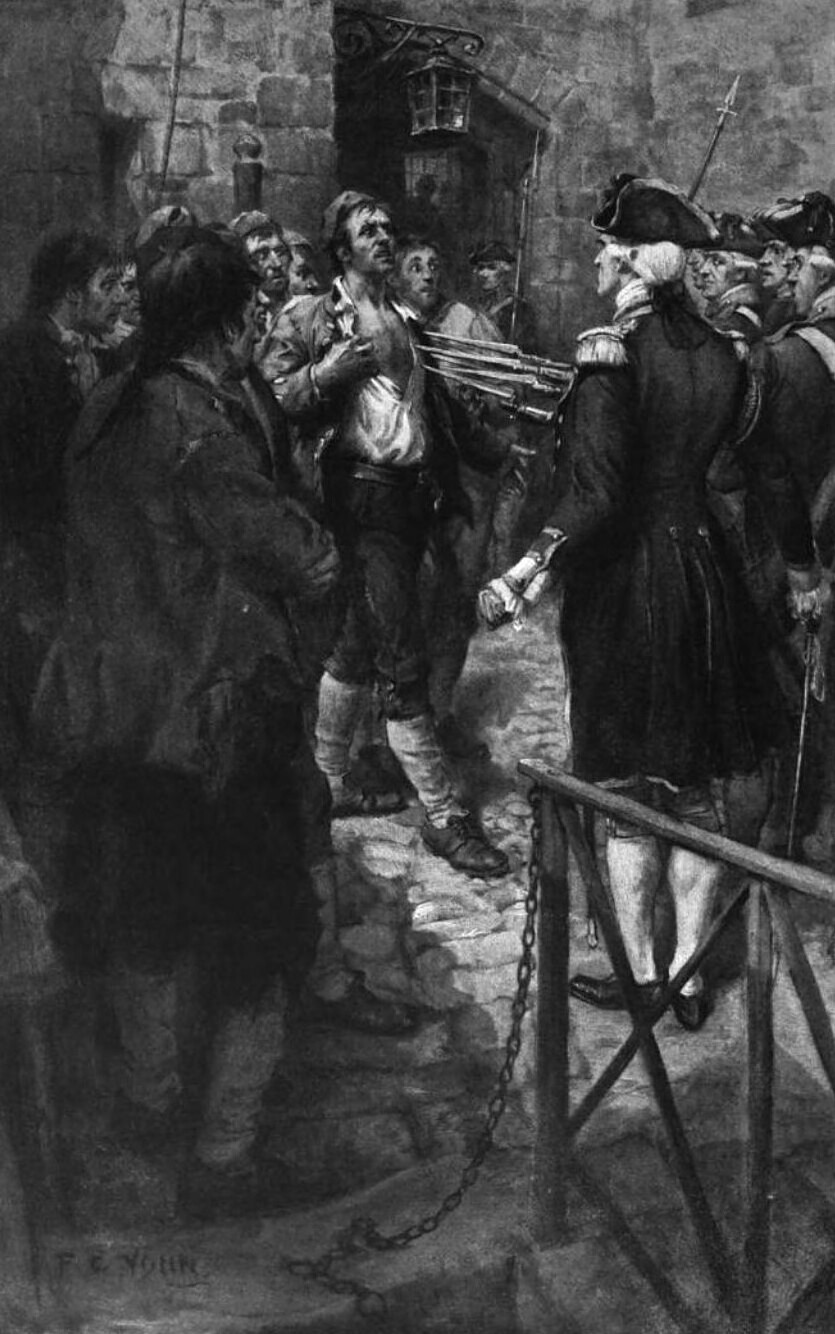
Engraving showing Ethan Allen with his captors in Montreal

== Aftermath ==
The abortive attack on Montreal led to the full mobilization of local militia in Montreal, raising nearly 1,000 men, but they soon began to drift away. Carleton refused to organize an expedition in relief of Fort Saint-Jean, and the militia members from rural parishes eventually disbanded to attend to their harvests and the defense of their own homes. In November, the besieged fort's commander capitulated, opening the Americans' way to Montreal. Carleton fled the city, making his way to Quebec City, and Montgomery occupied Montreal without firing a shot on November 13.

Allen and the other captives were brought to the city. Allen, in his account of the encounter, claims that Colonel Richard Prescott was intent on killing the captured Canadiens, but Allen interceded on their behalf, saying "I am the sole cause of their taking up arms." Allen was imprisoned in a ship's hold, and eventually sent to England. He spent about a year, mostly on prison ships, before he was released on parole in British-occupied New York City in November 1776, as the British authorities feared hanging him would create a martyr. He was eventually exchanged in May 1778 for British Colonel Archibald Campbell and resumed military and political service for the nascent Republic of Vermont in 1778.

Thomas Walker, the merchant to whom Allen had applied for assistance, was arrested in early October 1775 when twenty regulars and a dozen militia came from Montreal to his house in L'Assomption. Walker's house was destroyed, and he was imprisoned with the intent of sending him to England for trial. Walker was eventually freed when the Americans captured Montreal and most of the British fleet trying to escape the city.

== Legacy ==
Ethan Allen wrote a memoir recounting his version of the circumstances of his capture, and the time of his imprisonment. This work, along with Allen's other memoirs, were quite popular in the 19th century, going through numerous printings. A city park in the Montreal borough of Mercier-Hochelaga-Maisonneuve, where the action took place, is called Parc de la Capture-d'Ethan-Allen.
