= Benson John Lossing =

American historian (1813-1891)

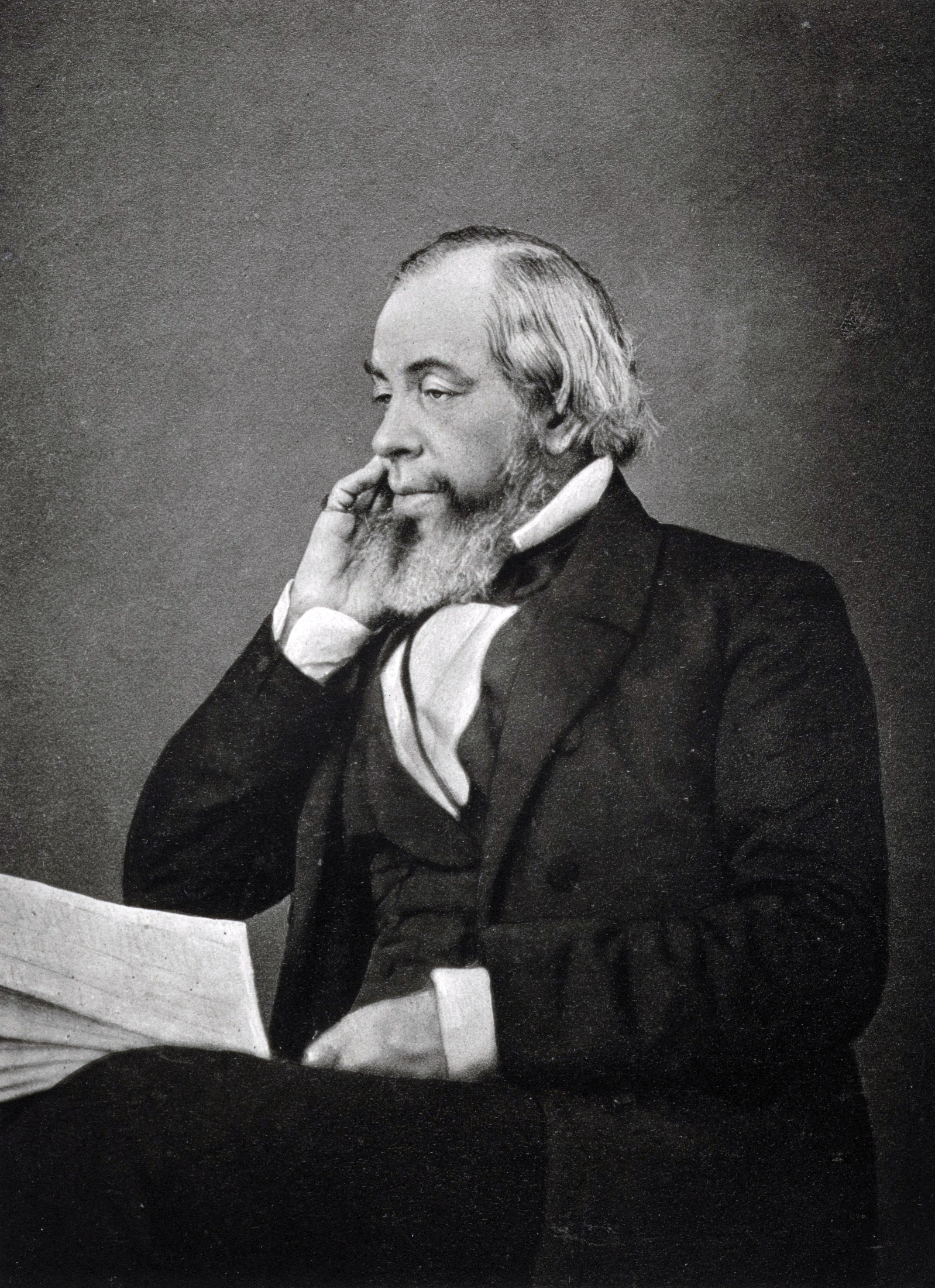
- Lossing in 1860
- Born: February 12, 1813; Beekman, New York
- Died: June 3, 1891 (aged 78); Dover Plains, New York
- Occupation: Historian

Benson John Lossing (February 12, 1813 — June 3, 1891) was an American historian, known best for his illustrated books on the American Revolution and American Civil War and features in Harper's Magazine. He was a charter trustee of Vassar College.

== Early life ==
Lossing was born February 12, 1813, in Beekman, New York. His father John was descended of old Dutch stock, originally surnamed Lassing or Lassingh, who had been among the earliest settlers of the Hudson Valley. His mother, Miriam Dorland Lossing was a Quaker. His formal education was curtailed when he was orphaned in 1824. Soon thereafter, he moved to Poughkeepsie to serve as apprentice to Adam Henderson, clock and watchmaker and silversmith. During his apprenticeship he read a number of history books, and over a period of several years pursued an independent study. He became interested in history after reading Edward Gibbon's Decline and Fall of the Roman Empire, John Marshall's The Life of George Washington, and the Bible. By 1833, Lossing and Henderson had formed a partnership.

== Career ==
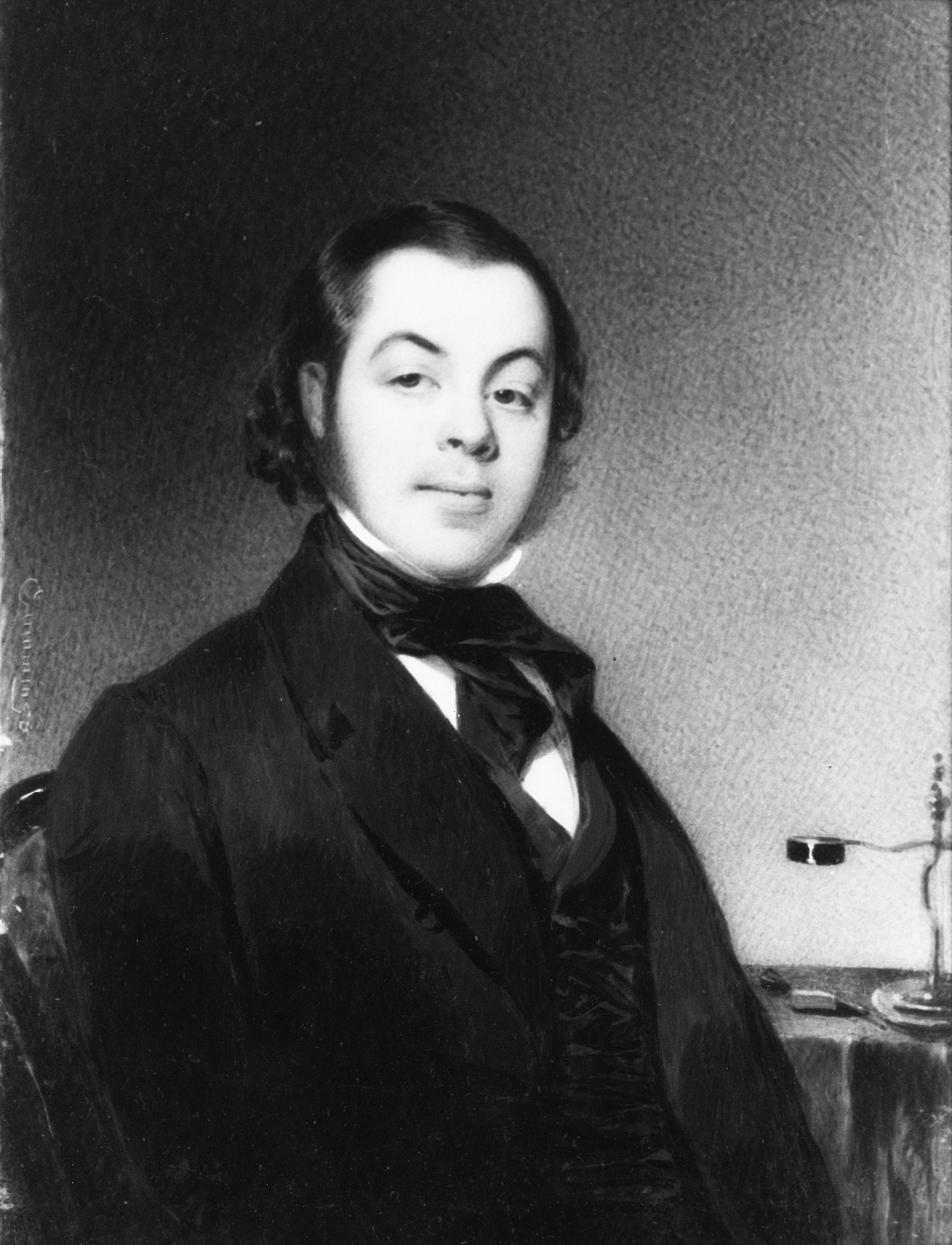
Benson John Lossing by Thomas Seir Cummings (c. 1835)

In 1835, Lossing became part owner and editor of the Poughkeepsie Telegraph. Out of that publication grew a semi-monthly literary paper, the Poughkeepsie Casket. Lossing began to learn the art of wood engraving from J. A. Adams, illustrator for the paper.

In 1838, Lossing moved to New York City seeking greater opportunity as a journalist and illustrator. He edited and illustrated J.S. Rothchild's weekly Family Magazine from 1839 to 1841 and launched his literary career with the publication of his Outline of the History of Fine Arts. In 1846, he joined William Barritt in a wood engraving business that became one of the largest of such firms in New York. His illustrations appeared in the New-York Mirror and several other periodicals. During this time, Lossing sat for a portrait by Thomas Seir Cummings (1804–1894), now in the collection of the Metropolitan Museum of Art, New York City.

Around 1848, Lossing conceived the idea of writing a narrative sketchbook on the American Revolution. The first installment was published in Harper's New Monthly Magazine in 1850; the completed Pictorial Field-Book of the Revolution was published in 1853. To gather material for the work, Lossing traveled some 8,000 miles throughout the United States and Canada. As with his subsequent books, his pen and ink drawings served as the primary illustrations when turned into wood cuts. The book won him critical acclaim and general reputation. During and after the Civil War, Lossing toured the United States and the once Confederacy. On the basis of that research, he published a three-volume pictorial field book/history of the war, which is also presumed to have been Mathew Brady's first collaboration in the use of his Civil War photographs as book illustrations. In 1860 and 1861, the London Art Journal featured a series of Lossing's articles describing the history and scenery of the Hudson Valley; the illustrated articles were published in 1866 under the title The Hudson: From the Wilderness to the Sea. Lossing was elected a member of the American Antiquarian Society in 1872. He was awarded an LL.D. by the University of Michigan in 1873, adding to lesser degrees previously awarded him by Hamilton College and Columbia University. He also worked with engraver and book publisher George Edward Perine, most notably on his "History of New York City" (1884).

=== Historian ===
Lossing's significance as a historian derives from his diligence in seeking out primary records, his interviews with participants of events and intimates of his biographical subjects, and his care to weigh and contrast details of his various sources. Although such efforts are today a standard among historians, in Lossing's time they were not. Historiography was not yet a discipline. Washington Irving, with whom he corresponded, wrote, "I have been gratified at finding how scrupulously attentive you have been to accuracy to facts, which is so essential in writings of an historical nature." This made him an essential secondary source for contemporary and succeeding historians, such as Theodore Roosevelt in his The Naval War of 1812.

== Personal life ==
On June 18, 1833, Lossing married his first wife, Alice Barrit, who died in 1855. On November 18, 1856, Lossing married his second wife, Helen Sweet. In 1868, the Lossings moved to a manor in Dover, New York, that Helen had inherited from her family; they called this The Ridge, but by later custom it has come to be known as Lossing Manor. There Benson had built a fireproof library to house his collection of over five thousand books and documents associated with the American Revolution and the framing of the Constitution. Lossing was actively involved in charitable, civic, literary, and historical societies, most notably serving as a charter trustee of Vassar College in Poughkeepsie. He died at home in Dover Plains, New York, on June 3, 1891. A written reminiscence of the Lossing family and life in 19th century New York was assembled by his son, Thomas Sweet Lossing; edited by his great-nephew, Peter Hannaford, it was published as My Heart Goes Home in 1997 (Purple Mountain Press, Fleischmanns, New York).

== Works ==
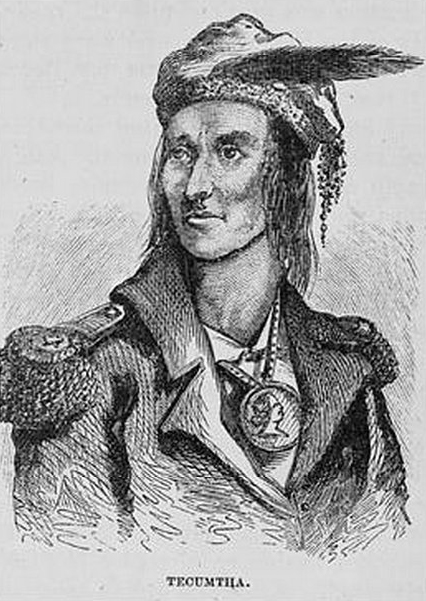
Portrait of Tecumseh by Benson John Lossing, after a pencil sketch by French trader Pierre Le Dru at Vincennes, published in Pictorial Field-Book of the War of 1812

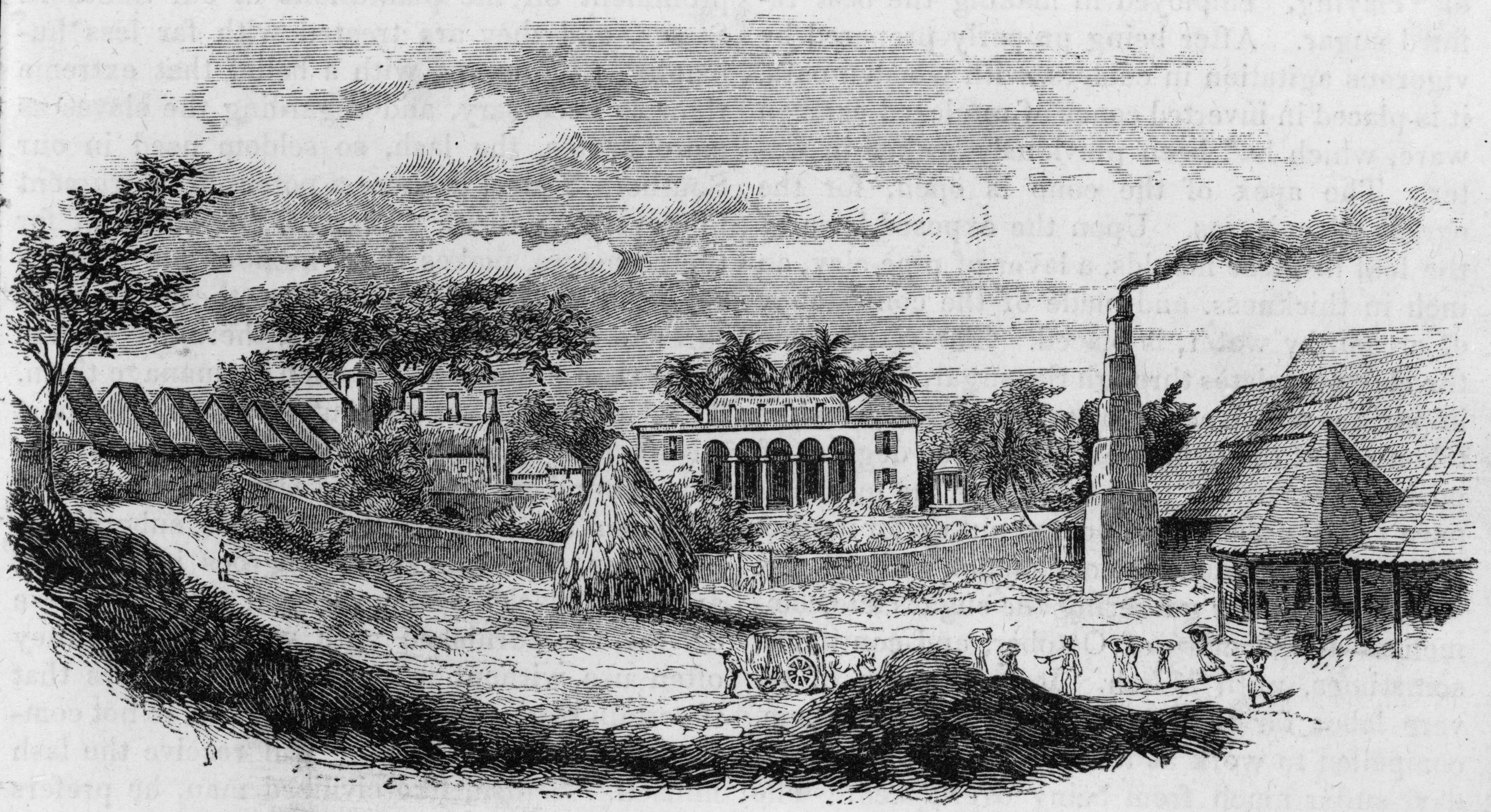
Sugar Plantation in Cuba, from the Harper's New Monthly Magazine (January 1853)

Among the over 40 books Benson Lossing authored:

- Outline of the History of the Fine Arts (1840)
- Seventeen Hundred and Seventy-Six or the War of Independence; A History of the Anglo - Americans from the period of the Union of the Colonies against the French to the inauguration of Washington the First President of the United States of America (1847; 1852)
- Biographical Sketches of the Signers of the Declaration of American Independence (1848)
- Pictorial Field Book of the Revolution (1850–1852)
- A Primary History of the United States for Schools and Families (1857, revised 1866)
- Life of Washington: A Biography Personal, Military, Political (1860)
- The Life and Times of Philip Schuyler (1860; revised, 1880)
- The Hudson from the Wilderness to the Sea (1866)
- Pictorial Field Book of the Civil War (1866–1869)
- Vassar College and its Founder (1867)
- History of The United States (1867)
- Pictorial Field Book of the War of 1812 (1868)
- Mount Vernon & Its Associations (1859) and other editions titled Mount Vernon, or the Home of Washington
- Washington and the American Republic (1870)
- Memoir of Lieut. Col. John T. Greble (1870) (private printing)
- A History of England, Political, Military, And Social from the Earliest Times to the Present (1871)
- Our Country: A Household History of the United States for all Readers, From the Discovery of America to the Present Time (1873)
- The American Centenary (1876)
- History of American Industries & Arts (1878)
- Story of the United States Navy for Boys (1881)
- Cyclopœdia of United States History (1881)
- New history of the United States, from the Discovery of the American Continent to ... Inauguration of ... Chester A. Arthur: For all Readers (1881)
- Biography of James Garfield (1882)
- Lossing's School History of the United States (1883)
- History of New York City (1884)
- Mary and Martha: The Mother and Wife of George Washington (1886)
- The Empire State, a Compendious History of the Commonwealth of New York (1888)
- Reflections of Rebellion: Hours With the Living Men and Women of the Revolution; A Pilgrimage (1889)

He co-authored, edited or collaborated in the following works:

- The Diary of George Washington, from 1789 to 1791 (1860)
- with Anna Seward: The Two Spies: Nathan Hale & John Andre (1886)
- with George Jotham Hagar, John Elliot Read and Alfred Hudson Guernsey: The Achievements of Four Centuries, or the Wonderful Story of Our Great Continent ... (1890)

Published posthumously were:

- The Progress of Four Hundred Years in The Great Republic of the West (1890)
- Lossing's Complete History of the United States (1896) Edition De Luxe. Limited to five Hundred copies of which this is No. (?) Lossing History Company, Nineteen Hundred and Five. Over seven Hundred Illustrations by Felix O.C. Darley and other well known Artists.
- Special Notice: Any Person using any of the illustrations in this book without permission of the publishers will be prosecuted-L.P. Co.
- with John Frederick Schroeder and E. C. Towne: The Life and Times of George Washington (1903)
- Harper's Encyclopedia of United States History from 458 A.D to 1909. Based Upon the Plan of Benson John Lossing (1909). This 10-volume set included contributions from Woodrow Wilson and Alfred Thayer Mahan.

== See also ==
- John Clement Fitzpatrick — archivist of early American history and George Washington papers
- William Wright Abbot — archivist of early American history and George Washington papers
