= Harpers Magazine =

Harpers Magazine may refer to:

- Harper's Magazine (since 1850), American monthly magazine of literature, politics, culture, finance, and the arts
- Harpers Wine & Spirit, formerly Harpers Magazine, British information service for the wine and spirit industry

== See also ==
- Harper's Bazaar (since 1867), an American women's fashion magazine
- Harper's Weekly (1857–1916), an American political magazine
- Harpers (disambiguation)
