= USS Ethan Allen =

Two ships of the United States Navy have been named USS Ethan Allen in honor of Ethan Allen, the guerrilla leader of the Green Mountain Boys.

- The first USS Ethan Allen (1861) was a bark that raided the Confederate States of America during the American Civil War.
- The second USS Ethan Allen (SSBN-608) was the lead ship of her class of ballistic missile submarine that served during the Cold War.

== Similar named ==
- SS Ethan Allen was a Liberty ship laid down by Bath Iron Works 7 January 1942, launched 16 August 1942 and scrapped 1960.
- Ethan Allen, the small passenger vessel involved in the 2005 Ethan Allen boating accident.
