= Harpers =

Harpers may refer to:

- Harpers, popular misnomer for Harper's Magazine, American monthly magazine
- Harper's Bazaar, monthly American fashion magazine
- Harpers Wine & Spirit, formerly Harpers Magazine (since 1878), British trade publication
- Harpers (Forgotten Realms), fictional organization in Forgotten Realms games
- Harper (publisher), an American publishing company

== See also ==
- Harper's (disambiguation)
- Harper (disambiguation)
- Harpers Magazine (disambiguation)
