= Crean Brush =

American lawyer

Crean Brush (c. 1725 – May 1778) was an 18th-century Irish-born Loyalist, "Yorker", and Tory from Cumberland County, New Hampshire Grants (present-day Vermont). He is remembered as one of the "notorious Yorkers" who resided for some time in eastern Vermont, and for his participation in Loyalist armies during the American Revolution.

== Early years and education ==
Crean Brush was born in Dublin, Ireland, about the year 1725. Educated for the bar, he held a military office prior to emigrating to the Thirteen Colonies in British America, reaching New York City before 1762. There he married his second wife, Margaret Montuzan.

== Career ==
Brush was first employed by the deputy secretary of the Province of New York, Goldsbrow Banyar, and in 1764 was licensed as an attorney in all of the king's courts in the province. It is supposed he became associated in this profession with John Kelly, who also figures in the Vermont records. In New York, he found employment in the office of the Provincial Secretary.

In 1771, Brush removed to Westminster, Vermont, and in February 1772 he was appointed clerk of Cumberland County. His main purpose in coming to Vermont was to sell his lands there, many thousands of acres of which had been acquired by him through New York grants. He was a member of the New York colonial (royal) assembly from January 5, 1773, to its dissolution on April 3, 1775. In this body, he proved himself an able, eloquent, and influential member, but strongly loyal and violent in his measures against Patriots in Vermont and adherents to the New Hampshire Grants. He wrote much for Rivington's Gazette, a Loyalist newspaper published in New York City. In the troubles which existed on the "Grants", as Vermont was then called, he took the side of New York. In 1775, he delivered a set-speech against electing delegates to the Second Continental Congress, which Patriot leaders George Clinton, Philip Schuyler and Woodhull answered.

Shortly after the commencement of the American Revolutionary War, Brush joined General Thomas Gage at Boston, who employed him to remove and take charge of the property in the buildings which had been appropriated as winter quarters for Gage's troops. On January 10, 1776, he wrote a memorial to Sir William Howe asking the command of troops, and, specially to be noted, a body of 300 men to be posted on the Connecticut River and open a line of communication from thence westward towards Lake Champlain. The body was to be on the same terms, as to pay and gratuity, as the Royal Fencible American Regiment, a corps just organized. The result is to be inferred from the fact that, on March 10, during the Siege of Boston by Patriot forces, he was ordered by Howe to take possession of the goods left behind by certain described persons who had fled the city or joined the Patriots, and put them on board of the ship Minerva or the brigantine Elizabeth. Under this commission, Brush, at the head of parties of Loyalists, broke open stores and dwelling-houses to plunder them, conveying their loot to the fleet. A number of soldiers and sailors from the departing fleet followed his example, and Boston, for the last few days of the siege, was in a state of anarchy.

Brush joined the British evacuation of Boston by ship, but was captured by the Americans, taken to Boston for trial on charges against him, and confined in jail from April 12, 1776, until November 15, 1777. The property on board the Elizabeth was worth US$100,000, and difficulties arose between the claimants and the captors which were expensive and contentious.

While imprisoned in Boston, Brush was denied privileges. He consoled himself with alcohol. Early in 1777, he was joined by his wife. The term of his imprisonment was more than 19 months. In autumn 1777, Mrs. Brush provided him with money and a horse, preparatory to his escape; and on the night of November 5, he passed the turnkey, disguised in his wife's garments, and fled to New York. He was later known to be in Vermont, where he went to look after his lands. But his career was nearly at an end. Patriot officials sequestered his estate, and Charles Cornwallis, 1st Marquess Cornwallis, to whom he applied to redress his personal wrongs and compensate his losses, not only refused, but told him that his "conduct merited them, and more." In May 1778, Brush killed himself with a pistol shot to his head.

Once proprietors of a vast domain, Brush and his family became outcasts. Of nearly 50,000 acres (200 km^{2}) of land which he owned in New York and the New Hampshire Grants, his heirs recovered possession of only a small part. His stepdaughter, Frances, later married Ethan Allen. His only child, Elizabeth Martha, married Thomas Norman, of Ireland.
