= Harper Township =

Harper Township may refer to:

- Harper Township, Cleveland County, Arkansas
- Harper Township, McPherson County, Kansas
