= Harper County =

Harper County is the name of two counties in the United States:

- Harper County, Kansas
- Harper County, Oklahoma
