= Harper Road =

Harper Road may refer to:

- Harper Road, London, a road in south London, England
- Harper Road, Singapore, a road in Singapore
- Prince Edward Island Route 158, officially known as Harper Road
