= Thomas Seir Cummings =

American painter (1804–1894)

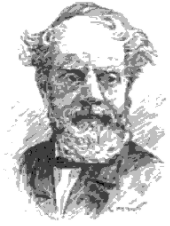
- Born: August 26, 1804; Bath, Somerset, England
- Died: September 24, 1894 (aged 90); Hackensack, New Jersey, United States
- Occupations: Painter, writer

Thomas Seir Cummings (1804–1894) was an English-American miniature painter and writer.

== Biography ==
Thomas Seir Cummings was born at Bath, England on August 26, 1804. He came to New York early in life and studied there with Henry Inman. He painted miniatures in water color, and many of his sitters were well-known contemporaries of the artist. In 1826 he helped to found the National Academy of Design, was its treasurer for many years and one of its early vice presidents. He also wrote an account of its history, entitled Historic Annals of the National Academy from its Foundation to 1865 (Philadelphia, 1865). His later life was spent in Connecticut, and Hackensack, N. J.

He died in Hackensack on September 24, 1894.
