= Harper's Encyclopedia of United States History =

Harper's Encyclopædia of United States History was published by Harper & Brothers in 1901 and 1905, and again later in 1915. Notably, it contains a preface, titled The Significance of American History, written by future president Woodrow Wilson, PhD, LL.D., then president of Princeton University. There are ten volumes in the set.
