= List of immigration detention sites in the United States, 2017–2020 =

List of sites used by US Immigration and Customs Enforcement for detaining noncitizens

This is a list of migration-related detention sites in the United States active from federal Fiscal Years 2017 to 2020.

ICE Detention Facilities in FY17–FY20
Facility Name	Status (year)	City	State	Facility Type	Authority	Management	Average Daily Population	Minimum Capacity	Demographics
Abraxas Academy Detention Center	Closed (Active FY19)	Morgantown, PA	PA	Juvenile detention center	JUVENILE		1		Female/Male
Adams County Detention Center	Active (FY19 – FY20)	Natchez, MS	MS	Dedicated migrant detention center	DIGSA		891	1100	Female/Male
Adelanto ICE processing center	Active (FY11 – FY20)	Adelanto, CA	CA	Dedicated migrant detention center	DIGSA	GEO Group	1291	1455	Female/Male
Alamance County Detention Facility	Active (FY19 – FY20)	Graham, NC	NC	Jail	IGSA	Alamance County Sheriff's Department	28	50	Female/Male
Albany County Jail	Closed (Active FY10 – FY19)	Albany, NY	NY	Jail	USMS IGA	New York State Commission of Correction	37	14	Female/Male
Alexandria City Jail	Closed (Active FY15 – FY17)	Alexandria, VA	VA	Jail	USMS IGA	Alexandria Sheriff's Office	2		Female/Male
Alexandria Staging Facility	Active (FY19 – FY20)	Alexandria International Airport, Alexandria, LA	LA	ICE short-term migrant detention center	STAGING	GEO Group	198	1170	Male
Allegany County Jail	Active (FY10 – FY17)	Belmont, NY	NY	Jail	IGSA	County (Sheriff)	11		Female
Allen County Jail	Active (FY20)	Ft. Wayne, IN	IN	Other	Other		1		Female/Male
Allen Parish Public Safety Complex	Active (FY16 – FY20)	Oberlin, LA	LA	Jail	IGSA	County	73	100	Male
Anne Arundel County Ordnance Road Correctional Center	Closed (Active FY19)	Glen Burnie, MD	MD	Jail	IGSA		39	40	Female/Male
Annex - Folkston IPC	Active (FY19 – FY20)	Folkston, GA	GA	Dedicated migrant detention center	DIGSA		194	338	Male
Atlanta City Detention Center	Closed (Active FY10 – FY17)	Atlanta, GA	GA	Jail	USMS IGA	City	233	200	Female/Male
Baker County Sheriff's Office	Active (FY10 – FY20)	Macclenny, FL	FL	Jail	IGSA	County	234		Female/Male
Baldwin County Correctional Center	Active (FY11 – FY19)	Bay Minette, AL	AL	Jail	IGSA	County (Sheriff)	4		Female/Male
Beaver County Jail	Active (FY19)	Aliquippa, PA	PA	Jail	USMS IGA	County (Sheriff)	4		Female/Male
Bedford Municipal Detention Center	Active (FY10 – FY20)	Bedford, TX	TX	Jail	IGSA	City	8		Female/Male
Bergen County Jail	Active (FY10 – FY20)	Hackensack, NJ	NJ	Jail	USMS IGA	County (Sheriff)	182	128	Female/Male
Berks County Family Shelter	Active (FY19 – FY20)	Leesport, PA	PA	Family migrant detention center	FAMILY		36	96	Female/Male
Bluebonnet Detention Center	Active (FY20)	Anson, TX	TX	Jail	IGSA	Management & Training Corporation (MTC)	258	750	Male
Boone County Jail	Active (FY10 – FY20)	Burlington, KY	KY	Jail	USMS IGA	Boone County Sheriff's Department	100	200	Female/Male
Bossier Parish Cor. Center	Closed (Active FY19)	Plain Dealing, LA	LA	Jail	USMS IGA		252		Male
Bristol County Detention Center	Active (FY10 – FY20)	North Dartmouth, MA	MA	Jail	IGSA	County (Sheriff)	115		Female/Male
Brooks County Detention Center	Closed (Active FY12 – FY19)	Falfurrias, TX	TX	Jail	USMS IGA	GEO Group	36	200	Female/Male
Broward Transitional Center	Active (FY10 – FY20)	Pompano Beach, FL	FL	Private migrant detention center	CDF	GEO Group	473	700	Female/Male
Buffalo (Batavia) Service Processing Center	Active (FY10 – FY20)	Batavia, NY	NY	ICE migrant detention center	SPC	Ahtna Global Services	369	400	Female/Male
Burnet County Jail	Active (FY14 – FY19)	Burnet, TX	TX	Jail	USMS IGA	County (Sheriff)	12		Male
Butler County Jail	Active (FY10 – FY20)	Hamilton, OH	OH	Jail	IGSA	County (Sheriff)	103		Female/Male
Butler County Jail	Closed (Active FY10 – FY19)	El Dorado, KS	KS	Jail	USMS IGA	County (Sheriff)	120	25	Female/Male
Cache County Jail	Active (FY19)	Logan, UT	UT	Jail	USMS IGA		38		Female/Male
Caldwell County Detention Center	Closed (Active FY10 – FY19)	Kingston, MO	MO	Jail	IGSA	Caldwell County Sheriff's Office	25		Female/Male
Calhoun County Correctional Center	Active (FY10 – FY20)	Battle Creek, MI	MI	Jail	IGSA	County (Sheriff)	140	75	Female/Male
Cambria County Jail	Active (FY16 – FY20)	Ebensburg, PA	PA	Jail	USMS IGA	Cambria County	30	15	Male
Caroline Detention Facility	Active (FY19 – FY20)	Bowling Green, VA	VA	Dedicated migrant detention center	DIGSA		226	224	Female/Male
Carver County Jail	Active (FY10 – FY20)	Chaska, MN	MN	Jail	IGSA	Carver County Sheriff's Office	12		Female/Male
Cascade County Jail (Montana)	Active (FY10 – FY19)	Great Falls, MT	MT	Jail	USMS IGA	County (Sheriff)	2	35	Female/Male
Cass County Jail	Active (FY10 – FY19)	Plattsmouth, NE	NE	Jail	USMS IGA	County (Sheriff)	16	50	Female/Male
Catahoula Correctional Center	Active (FY19 – FY20)	Harrisonburg, LA	LA	Jail	IGSA	LaSalle Corrections	387	625	Male
CBP Chula Vista BPS	Active (FY19 – FY20)	San Diego, CA	CA	Other	Other		7		Female/Male
CBP San Ysidro POE	Active (FY19)	San Ysidro, CA	CA	Other	Other		11		Female/Male
Central Arizona Florence Correctional Complex	Active (FY10 – FY20)	Florence, AZ	AZ	Jail	USMS IGA	CoreCivic	126	806	Male
Central Texas Detention Facility	Closed (Active FY19)	San Antonio, TX	TX	Jail	USMS IGA	GEO Group	1		Female/Male
Charleston County Detention Center	Active (FY10 – FY20)	North Charleston, SC	SC	Jail	USMS IGA	County (Sheriff)	9	256	Male
Chase County Detention Facility	Active (FY10 – FY20)	Cottonwood Falls, KS	KS	Jail	IGSA	County (Sheriff)	69		Female/Male
Chautauqua County Jail	Active (FY12 – FY20)	Mayville, NY	NY	Jail	IGSA	County (Sheriff)	2		Female/Male
Chavez Detention Center	Active (FY19)	Roswell, NM	NM	Jail	IGSA		1		Female/Male
Chippewa County SSM	Active (FY10 – FY20)	Sault Sainte Marie, MI	MI	Jail	IGSA	County (Sheriff)	24		Female/Male
Christian County Jail	Active (FY10 – FY20)	Ozark, MO	MO	Jail	IGSA	County (Sheriff)	10		Male
Cibola County Correctional Center	Active (FY17 – FY20)	Milan, NM	NM	Jail	IGSA	CoreCivic	52	150	Male
Cibola County Detention Center	Closed (Active FY19)	Grants, NM	NM	Jail	IGSA		4		Female/Male
Clay County Jail	Active (FY13 – FY20)	Brazil, IN	IN	Jail	USMS IGA	County (Sheriff)	56		Male
Clinton County Correctional Facility	Active (FY10 – FY20)	Lock Haven, PA	PA	Jail	USMS IGA	County (Corrections)	76	50	Male
Clinton County Jail	Active (FY10 – FY20)	Plattsburgh, NY	NY	Jail	USMS IGA	County (Sheriff)	8	13	Female/Male
Coastal Bend Detention Facility	Active (FY17 – FY20)	Robstown, TX	TX	Jail	USMS IGA	GEO Group	17	700	Male
Cobb County Jail	Active (FY10 – FY20)	Marietta, GA	GA	Jail	IGSA	County (Sheriff)	2		Female/Male
Collier County Naples Jail Center	Active (FY10 – FY20)	Naples, FL	FL	Jail	IGSA	County (Sheriff)	6		Female/Male
Contra Costa County Jail West	Closed (Active FY10 – FY17)	Richmond, CA	CA	Jail	USMS IGA	County (Sheriff)	205	318	Female/Male
Cowlitz County Juvenile	Active (FY19 – FY20)	Longview, WA	WA	Juvenile detention center	JUVENILE		3		Female/Male
Cumberland County Jail	Active (FY10 – FY20)	Portland, ME	ME	Jail	USMS IGA	County (Sheriff)	2	70	Female/Male
Dakota County Jail	Active (FY16 – FY20)	Dakota City, NE	NE	Jail	USMS IGA	County (Sheriff)	1	20	Female/Male
Dallas County Jail - Lew Sterrett Justice Center	Active (FY19 – FY20)	Dallas, TX	TX	Jail	USMS IGA	CoreCivic	7		Female/Male
Davidson County Sheriff	Closed (Active FY10 – FY19)	Nashville, TN	TN	Jail	IGSA	County (Sheriff)	7		Female/Male
Dearborn Police Department	Closed (Active FY10 – FY17)	Dearborn, MI	MI	Jail	IGSA	Dearborn Police Department	3	8	Female/Male
Dekalb County Detention Center	Active (FY10 – FY20)	Fort Payne, AL	AL	Jail	USMS IGA	County (Sheriff)	6	60	Female/Male
Delaware County Jail (George W. Hill)	Closed (Active FY16 – FY19)	Thornton, PA	PA	Jail	USMS IGA	County	3		Female/Male
Denver Contract Detention Facility (aka Aurora ICE Processing Center)	Active (FY10 – FY20)	Aurora, CO	CO	Private migrant detention center	CDF	GEO Group	462	525	Female/Male
Denver Contract Detention Facility (CDF) II	Active (FY19 – FY20)	Aurora, CO	CO	Private migrant detention center	CDF		123	432	Female/Male
Department of Corrections Hagatna	Active (FY19 – FY20)	Hagatna, GU	GU	Jail	USMS IGA		10		Female/Male
Dodge County Jail	Active (FY10 – FY20)	Juneau, WI	WI	Jail	USMS IGA	Dodge County Sheriff's Department	92	265	Female/Male
Douglas County Department of Corrections	Active (FY10 – FY20)	Omaha, NE	NE	Jail	IGSA	County (Corrections)	17		Female/Male
East Hidalgo Detention Center	Active (FY12 – FY20)	La Villa, TX	TX	Jail	USMS IGA	GEO Group	2	100	Female/Male
Eden Detention Center	Active (FY19 – FY20)	Eden, TX	TX	Jail	USMS IGA	CoreCivic	257		Male
El Paso County Criminal Justice Center	Closed (Active FY10 – FY17)	Colorado Springs, CO	CO	Jail	IGSA	County (Sheriff)	1		Female/Male
El Paso Service Processing Center	Active (FY10 – FY20)	El Paso, TX	TX	ICE migrant detention center	SPC	ICE	522	600	Female/Male
El Valle Detention Facility	Active (FY19 – FY20)	Raymondville, TX	TX	Jail	IGSA	Management & Training Corporation (MTC)	610	750	Female/Male
Elgin Police Department	Closed (Active FY10 – FY17)	Elgin, IL	IL	Jail	IGSA	City	1		Male
Elizabeth Detention Center	Active (FY10 – FY20)	Elizabeth, NJ	NJ	Private migrant detention center	CDF	CoreCivic	157	285	Female/Male
Elmore County Jail	Active (FY10 – FY20)	Mountain Home, ID	ID	Jail	USMS IGA	County (Sheriff)	2	15	Female/Male
Eloy Detention Center	Active (FY10 – FY20)	Eloy, AZ	AZ	Dedicated migrant detention center	DIGSA	CoreCivic	1010	1550	Female/Male
Erie County Jail	Active (FY20)	Erie, PA	PA	Jail	USMS IGA	Erie County Sheriff's Office	0	5	Female/Male
Essex County Correctional Facility	Active (FY10 – FY20)	Newark, NJ	NJ	Jail	IGSA	GEO Group	506	800	Male
Etowah County Jail (Alabama)	Active (FY10 – FY20)	Gadsden, AL	AL	Jail	USMS IGA	Etowah County Sheriff's Department	169	350	Male
Euless City Jail	Active (FY10 – FY20)	Euless, TX	TX	Jail	IGSA	City	8		Female/Male
Fayette County Detention Center	Active (FY16 – FY19)	Lexington, KY	KY	Jail	USMS IGA	County	3		Female/Male
Florence Service Processing Center	Active (FY10 – FY20)	Florence, AZ	AZ	ICE migrant detention center	SPC	Asset Protection & Security Services	262	374	Male
Florence Staging Facility	Active (FY19 – FY20)	Florence, AZ	AZ	ICE short-term migrant detention center	STAGING		120	374	Male
Folkston ICE Processing Center (D. Ray James)	Closed (Active FY17)	Folkston, GA	GA	Dedicated migrant detention center	DIGSA	GEO Group	206	780	Male
Forsyth County Jail	Closed (Active FY13 – FY19)	Winston-Salem, NC	NC	Jail	USMS IGA	County (Sheriff)	1		Female/Male
Franklin County House of Correction	Active (FY10 – FY20)	Greenfield, MA	MA	Jail	USMS IGA	Franklin County Sheriff's Office	21	90	Male
Frederick County Detention Center	Closed (Active FY10 – FY19)	Frederick, MD	MD	Jail	IGSA	County (Sheriff)	40		Male
Freeborn County Adult Detention Center	Active (FY10 – FY20)	Albert Lea, MN	MN	Jail	IGSA	County (Sheriff)	60		Male
Garvin County Detention Center	Active (FY19 – FY20)	Pauls Valley, OK	OK	Jail	IGSA	County (Sheriff)	1		Female/Male
Geauga County Jail	Active (FY11 – FY20)	Chardon, OH	OH	Jail	USMS IGA	County (Sheriff)	48	30	Female/Male
Glades County Detention Center	Active (FY10 – FY20)	Moore Haven, FL	FL	Jail	IGSA	Glades County Sheriff's Department	380		Female/Male
Golden State Annex	Active (FY20)	McFarland, CA	CA	Private migrant detention center	CDF	GEO Group	3	560	Female/Male
Grand Forks County Correctional Facility	Active (FY10 – FY19)	Grand Forks, ND	ND	Jail	IGSA	County (Sheriff)	5		Female/Male
Grayson County Jail	Active (FY11 – FY17)	Leitchfield, KY	KY	Jail	USMS IGA	County (Jailer)	1	10	Female/Male
Guaynabo MDC (San Juan)	Active (FY19 – FY20)	San Juan, PR	PR	Federal prison	BOP		5		Female/Male
Hall County Department of Corrections	Active (FY10 – FY20)	Grand Island, NE	NE	Jail	IGSA	County (Sheriff)	57		Female/Male
Hall County Jail	Closed (Active FY10 – FY17)	Gainesville, GA	GA	Jail	USMS IGA	Corrections Corporation of America	2		Male
Hancock County Pub Sfty Cplx	Active (FY20)	Bay St. Louis, MS	MS	Jail	IGSA		1		Female/Male
Hardin County Jail	Active (FY10 – FY20)	Eldora, IA	IA	Jail	IGSA	County (Sheriff)	51		Female/Male
Henderson County Jail	Active (FY20)	Athens, TX	TX	Jail	IGSA		0		Female/Male
Henderson Detention Center	Active (FY11 – FY20)	Henderson, NV	NV	Jail	USMS IGA	City	181	300	Female/Male
Holiday Inn Exp San Antonio	Active (FY20)	San Antonio, TX	TX	Other	Other		0		Female/Male
Honolulu Federal Detention Center	Active (FY19 – FY20)	Honolulu, HI	HI	Federal prison	BOP	Federal Bureau of Prisons	28		Female/Male
Houston Processing Center	Active (FY10 – FY20)	Houston, TX	TX	Private migrant detention center	CDF	CoreCivic	577	750	Female/Male
Howard County Detention Center	Active (FY10 – FY20)	Jessup, MD	MD	Jail	IGSA	County (Corrections)	44		Male
Hudson County Correctional Center	Active (FY10 – FY20)	Kearny, NJ	NJ	Jail	IGSA	County (Corrections)	191	476	Female/Male
IAH Secure Adult Detention Facility (Polk)	Active (FY10 – FY20)	Livingston, TX	TX	Jail	IGSA	Management & Training Corporation (MTC)	294	350	Male
Immigration Centers of America Farmville	Active (FY10 – FY20)	Farmville, VA	VA	Dedicated migrant detention center	DIGSA	Virginia Department of Corrections	485	500	Male
Imperial Regional Detention Facility	Active (FY14 – FY20)	Calexico, CA	CA	Private migrant detention center	CDF	Management & Training Corporation (MTC)	496	640	Female/Male
Irwin County Detention Center	Active (FY11 – FY20)	Ocilla, GA	GA	Jail	IGSA	LaSalle Corrections	631	600	Female/Male
Jack Harwell Detention Center	Closed (Active FY17 – FY19)	Waco, TX	TX	Jail	USMS IGA	Community Education Centers (GEO Group subsidiary)	1	200	Female/Male
Jackson Parish Correctional Center	Active (FY19 – FY20)	Jonesboro, LA	LA	Dedicated migrant detention center	DIGSA	LaSalle Corrections	605	751	Female/Male
James A. Musick Facility	Closed (Active FY11 – FY19)	Irvine, CA	CA	Jail	IGSA	County (Sheriff)	144		Female/Male
Jefferson County Jail	Active (FY10 – FY19)	Rigby, ID	ID	Jail	IGSA	County	6		Female/Male
Joe Corley Processing Center	Active (FY10 – FY20)	Conroe, TX	TX	Jail	IGSA	GEO Group	150	1050	Female/Male
Johnson County Corrections Center	Active (FY10 – FY20)	Cleburne, TX	TX	Jail	IGSA	Community Education Centers (GEO Group subsidiary)	119		Male
Josephine County Jail	Closed (Active FY10 – FY17)	Grants Pass, OR	OR	Jail	USMS IGA	Josephine County Sheriff's Department	1	31	Male
Kandiyohi County Jail	Active (FY19 – FY20)	Willmar, MN	MN	Jail	IGSA		55		Female/Male
Kankakee County Jail (Jerome Combs Detention Center)	Active (FY17 – FY20)	Kankakee, IL	IL	Jail	USMS IGA	County	89		Male
Karnes County Correctional Center	Active (FY20)	Karnes City, TX	TX	Jail	USMS IGA	GEO Group	0	60	Female/Male
Karnes County Residential Center	Active (FY19 – FY20)	Karnes City, TX	TX	Family migrant detention center	FAMILY	The GEO Group, Inc.	211 The ICE spreadsheets from FY19 also shows a facility called 'KARNES COUNTY RESIDENTIAL CENTER.' It is unclear if this is a subpopulation of this facility or a separate addition and its data has been skipped here.	830	Male
Kay County Justice Facility	Active (FY19 – FY20)	Newkirk, OK	OK	Jail	IGSA		87		Female
Kenosha County Detention Center	Closed (Active FY10 – FY19)	Kenosha, WI	WI	Jail	USMS IGA	Kenosha County Sheriff's Department	179	210	Female/Male
Kittitas County Jail	Closed (Active FY19)	Ellensburg, WA	WA	Jail	IGSA		2		Female/Male
Knox County Detention Facility	Active (FY19)	Knoxville, TN	TN	Jail	USMS IGA		3		Female/Male
Krome North Service Processing Center	Active (FY10 – FY20)	Miami, FL	FL	ICE migrant detention center	SPC	Akima (division of NANA Regional Corporation)	533	450	Male
La Palma Correctional Center	Active (FY19 – FY20)	Eloy, AZ	AZ	Dedicated migrant detention center	DIGSA	CoreCivic	974 The ICE spreadsheets from FY19 and FY20 also shows a facility called 'LA PALMA CORRECTION CENTER - APSO.' It is unclear if this is a subpopulation of this facility or a separate addition and its data has been skipped here.	650	Male
La Paz County Adult Detention Facility	Active (FY19)	Parker, AZ	AZ	Jail	USMS IGA	County (Sheriff)	4		Female/Male
La Salle County Regional Detention Center	Active (FY11 – FY20)	Encinal, TX	TX	Jail	USMS IGA	County	5	250	Male
Laredo Processing Center	Active (FY10 – FY20)	Laredo, TX	TX	Dedicated migrant detention center	DIGSA	CoreCivic	188	400	Female/Male
Lasalle Correctional Center Olla	Active (FY19 – FY20)	Olla, LA	LA	Jail	IGSA		328	550	Female/Male
Lasalle ICE Processing Center (Jena)	Active (FY10 – FY20)	Jena, LA	LA	Dedicated migrant detention center	DIGSA	GEO Group	943	1170	Female/Male
Lehigh County Jail (Pennsylvania)	Closed (Active FY19)	Allentown, PA	PA	Jail	USMS IGA		3		Female/Male
Lexington County Jail	Active (FY11 – FY20)	Lexington, SC	SC	Jail	USMS IGA	County (Sheriff)	2	28	Female/Male
Limestone County Detention Center	Active (FY19 – FY20)	Groesbeck, TX	TX	Jail	USMS IGA	Community Education Centers (GEO Group subsidiary)	245		Male
Lincoln County Detention Center	Active (FY10 – FY19)	Troy, MO	MO	Jail	IGSA	Lincoln County Sheriff's Office	6		Female/Male
Linn County Jail	Active (FY10 – FY20)	Cedar Rapids, IA	IA	Jail	USMS IGA	Linn County Sheriff	5	25	Female/Male
Lonoke Police Department	Active (FY10 – FY20)	Lonoke, AR	AR	Jail	IGSA	City	1		Female/Male
Lubbock County Detention Center	Active (FY16 – FY17)	Lubbock, TX	TX	Jail	USMS IGA	County (Sheriff)	1	15	Male
Madison County Jail	Active (FY19 – FY20)	Canton, MS	MS	Jail	USMS IGA		2		Female/Male
Main - Folkston IPC (D Ray James)	Active (FY19 – FY20)	Folkston, GA	GA	Dedicated migrant detention center	DIGSA		456	544	Male
Marion County Jail	Active (FY20)	Indianapolis, IN	IN	Jail	USMS IGA	County (Sheriff)	2	5	Female/Male
Marshall County Jail	Closed (Active FY11 – FY19)	Marshalltown, IA	IA	Jail	USMS IGA	County (Sheriff)	42	35	Female/Male
McHenry County Correctional Facility	Active (FY10 – FY20)	Woodstock, IL	IL	Jail	USMS IGA	McHenry County Sheriff	213	250	Female/Male
Mecklenburg County Detention Center North	Closed (Active FY10 – FY17)	Charlotte, NC	NC	Jail	USMS IGA	Mecklenburg County Sheriff's Department	2		Female/Male
Mesa Verde ICE Processing Center	Active (FY15 – FY20)	Bakersfield, CA	CA	Private migrant detention center	CDF	GEO Group	248	320	Female/Male
Miller County Jail	Active (FY16 – FY17)	Texarkana, AR	AR	Jail	USMS IGA	County (Sheriff)	1	13	Male
Minicassia Detention Center	Active (FY10 – FY20)	Burley, ID	ID	Jail	IGSA	County (Sheriff)	3		Female/Male
Monroe County Detention Center	Closed (Active FY10 – FY19)	Key West, FL	FL	Jail	IGSA	Monroe County Sheriff's Department	80	50	Male
Monroe County Detention-Dorm	Active (FY14 – FY20)	Monroe, MI	MI	Jail	IGSA	County (Sheriff)	47		Male
Montgomery City Jail	Closed (Active FY11 – FY19)	Montgomery, AL	AL	Jail	IGSA	City	2		Female/Male
Montgomery County Jail	Active (FY10 – FY20)	Montgomery City, MO	MO	Jail	IGSA	Montgomery County Sheriff's Office	26		Female/Male
Montgomery ICE Processing Center	Active (FY19 – FY20)	Conroe, TX	TX	Private migrant detention center	CDF	GEO Group	626	750	Female/Male
Morgan County Adult Detention Center	Active (FY10 – FY20)	Versailles, MO	MO	Jail	IGSA	Morgan County Sheriff's Office	39		Male
Morrow County Correctional Facility	Active (FY10 – FY20)	Mount Gilead, OH	OH	Jail	IGSA	County (Sheriff)	29		Female/Male
Natchitoches Parish Detention. Center	Closed (Active FY19)	Natchitoches, LA	LA	Jail	USMS IGA		34		Female/Male
Nevada Southern Detention Center	Active (FY16 – FY20)	Pahrump, NV	NV	Jail	USMS IGA	CoreCivic	156	250	Female/Male
New Hanover County Jail	Active (FY17 – FY20)	Castle Hayne, NC	NC	Jail	IGSA	County (Sheriff)	1		Female/Male
Nobles County Jail	Closed (Active FY10 – FY19)	Worthington, MN	MN	Jail	IGSA	County (Sheriff)	2		Female/Male
Northeast Ohio Correctional Center (Youngstown CDF)	Active (FY17 – FY19)	Youngstown, OH	OH	Private migrant detention center	CDF	Corrections Corporation of America	287	300	Male
Northern Oregon Correctional Facility	Active (FY10 – FY19)	The Dalles, OR	OR	Jail	IGSA	County (Jailer)	25		Male
Northern Oregon Juvenile Detention	Closed (Active FY19)	The Dalles, OR	OR	Juvenile detention center	JUVENILE		2		Female/Male
Nye County Detention Center, Southern (Pahrump)	Active (FY19 – FY20)	Pahrump, NV	NV	Jail	IGSA		73		Female/Male
Ogle County Jail	Active (FY20)	Oregon, IL	IL	Jail	USMS IGA		0		Female/Male
Okmulgee County Jail	Active (FY19 – FY20)	Okmulgee, OK	OK	Jail	IGSA		177		Male
Oldham County Jail	Active (FY15 – FY19)	La Grange, KY	KY	Jail	IGSA	County (Jailer)	2		Female/Male
Orange County Jail	Active (FY10 – FY20)	Goshen, NY	NY	Jail	IGSA	County (Corrections)	100		Female/Male
Orange County Jail	Active (FY15 – FY19)	Orlando, FL	FL	Jail	USMS IGA	Orange County Sheriff's Department	165	5	Female/Male
Otay Mesa Detention Center (San Diego CDF)	Active (FY10 – FY20)	San Diego, CA	CA	Private migrant detention center	CDF	CoreCivic	726	1100	Female/Male
Otero County Prison Facility	Closed (Active FY17)	Chaparral, NM	NM	Jail	USMS IGA	Management & Training Corp (MTC)	89		Female/Male
Otero County Processing Center	Active (FY10 – FY20)	Chaparral, NM	NM	Dedicated migrant detention center	DIGSA	Management & Training Corporation (MTC)	618	500	Male
Phelps County Jail	Active (FY10 – FY20)	Holdrege, NE	NE	Jail	USMS IGA	County (Sheriff)	13	20	Female/Male
Pickens County Detention Center	Active (FY20)	Carrollton, AL	AL	Other	Other		0		Female/Male
Pike County Correctional Facility	Active (FY10 – FY20)	Lords Valley, PA	PA	Jail	IGSA	County (Sheriff)	119		Male
Pine Prairie ICE Processing Center	Active (FY16 – FY20)	Pine Prairie, LA	LA	Dedicated migrant detention center	DIGSA	GEO Group	510	700	Male
Pinellas County Jail	Active (FY17 – FY19)	Clearwater, FL	FL	Jail	USMS IGA	County (Sheriff)	5	5	Female/Male
Platte County Detention Center	Active (FY16 – FY20)	Platte City, MO	MO	Jail	IGSA	County (Sheriff)	6		Female/Male
Platte County Jail	Active (FY20)	Wheatland, WY	WY	Jail	USMS IGA		1		Female/Male
Plymouth County Correctional Facility	Active (FY10 – FY20)	Plymouth, MA	MA	Jail	IGSA	Plymouth County	221		Male
Polk County Jail	Active (FY10 – FY20)	Des Moines, IA	IA	Jail	USMS IGA	County (Sheriff)	29	60	Female/Male
Port Isabel	Active (FY10 – FY20)	Los Fresnos, TX	TX	ICE migrant detention center	SPC	Ahtna Global Services	678	800	Female/Male
Pottawattamie County Jail	Active (FY10 – FY19)	Council Bluffs, IA	IA	Jail	USMS IGA	Pottawattamie County Sheriff	9	10	Female/Male
Prairieland Detention Facility	Active (FY17 – FY20)	Alvarado, TX	TX	Dedicated migrant detention center	DIGSA	LaSalle Corrections	486	550	Female/Male
Pulaski County Jail	Active (FY10 – FY20)	Ullin, IL	IL	Jail	IGSA	GEO Group	116		Female/Male
Ramsey County Adult Detention Center	Closed (Active FY10 – FY17)	St. Paul, MN	MN	Jail	USMS IGA	Ramsey County Sheriff's Office	4	15	Female/Male
Randall County Jail	Active (FY10 – FY20)	Amarillo, TX	TX	Jail	USMS IGA	County (Sheriff)	1	40	Female/Male
Red Roof Inn	Closed (Active FY19)	Seatac, WA	WA	Other	Other		1		Female/Male
Rensselaer County Correctional Facility	Active (FY19 – FY20)	Troy, NY	NY	Jail	USMS IGA		3		Female/Male
Richwood Correctional Center	Active (FY19 – FY20)	Richwood, LA	LA	Dedicated migrant detention center	DIGSA	LaSalle Corrections	500	677	Male
Rio Cosumnes Correctional. Center	Closed (Active FY14 – FY17)	Elk Grove, CA	CA	Jail	IGSA	County (Sheriff)	125		Male
Rio Grande County Jail	Active (FY20)	Del Norte, CO	CO	Jail	IGSA		0		Female/Male
Rio Grande Detention Center	Active (FY14 – FY20)	Laredo, TX	TX	Private migrant detention center	USMS CDF	GEO Group	296	275	Male
River Correctional Center	Active (FY19 – FY20)	Ferriday, LA	LA	Dedicated migrant detention center	DIGSA	LaSalle Corrections	290	361	Male
Roanoke City Jail	Active (FY15 – FY19)	Roanoke, VA	VA	Jail	USMS IGA	City	2		Female/Male
Robert A. Deyton Detention Facility	Active (FY19 – FY20)	Lovejoy, GA	GA	Private migrant detention center	USMS CDF		17		Female/Male
Rock Island County Correctional Center	Closed (Active FY10 – FY17)	Rock Island, IL	IL	Jail	USMS IGA	County (Sheriff)	1	20	Male
Rolling Plains Detention Center	Active (FY10 – FY20)	Haskell, TX	TX	Jail	USMS IGA	LaSalle Corrections	65	525	Female/Male
Saint Clair County Jail	Active (FY10 – FY20)	Port Huron, MI	MI	Jail	IGSA	County (Sheriff)	43		Male
Saint Tammany Parish Jail	Closed (Active FY12 – FY19)	Covington, LA	LA	Jail	IGSA	County (Sheriff)	9		Female/Male
Saipan Department of Corrections (Susupe)	Active (FY19 – FY20)	Saipan, MP	MP	Jail	USMS IGA		6		Female/Male
Saline County Jail	Active (FY20)	Wilber, NE	NE	Other	Other		0		Female/Male
Salt Lake County Metro Jail	Active (FY20)	Salt Lake City, UT	UT	Jail	USMS IGA		1		Female/Male
San Juan Staging	Active (FY19)	Guaynabo, PR	PR	ICE short-term migrant detention center	STAGING		2		Female/Male
San Luis Regional Detention Center	Active (FY13 – FY20)	San Luis, AZ	AZ	Jail	IGSA	LaSalle Corrections	46	100	Female/Male
Sebastian County Detention Center	Active (FY10 – FY17)	Fort Smith, AR	AR	Jail	USMS IGA	County (Sheriff)	2	20	Male
Seneca County Jail	Active (FY10 – FY20)	Tiffin, OH	OH	Jail	IGSA	Seneca County Sheriff's Office	46		Female/Male
Shawnee County Department of Corrections	Closed (Active FY16 – FY19)	Topeka, KS	KS	Jail	IGSA	County (Corrections)	8		Female/Male
Sherburne County Jail	Active (FY10 – FY20)	Elk River, MN	MN	Jail	IGSA	Sherburne County Sheriff's Department	213	300	Female/Male
South Central Regional Jail	Active (FY10 – FY20)	Charleston, WV	WV	Jail	USMS IGA	County (Corrections)	3	5	Female/Male
South Louisiana Detention Center	Active (FY19 – FY20)	Basile, LA	LA	Dedicated migrant detention center	DIGSA		410	700	Female/Male
South Texas Family Residential Center	Active (FY19 – FY20)	Dilley, TX	TX	Family migrant detention center	FAMILY	CoreCivic formerly known as Corrections Corporation of America (CCA)	726	2400	Female/Male
South Texas ICE Processing Center	Active (FY10 – FY20)	Pearsall, TX	TX	Private migrant detention center	CDF	GEO Group	1076	1350	Female/Male
Stewart Detention Center	Active (FY10 – FY20)	Lumpkin, GA	GA	Dedicated migrant detention center	DIGSA	CoreCivic	1352	1600	Male
Story County Jail	Closed (Active FY19)	Nevada, IA	IA	Jail	USMS IGA		2		Female/Male
Strafford County Corrections	Active (FY10 – FY20)	Dover, NH	NH	Jail	IGSA	County (Corrections)	80		Female/Male
Suffolk County House of Corrections	Closed (Active FY10 – FY19)	Boston, MA	MA	Jail	IGSA	County (Sheriff)	145		Female/Male
Sunny Glen Cld Home NDR Center	Active (FY20)	Raymondville, TX	TX	Other	Other		1		Female/Male
T Don Hutto Residential Center	Active (FY19 – FY20)	Taylor, TX	TX	Family migrant detention center	FAMILY	Corrections Corporation of America	278	461	Female
Tacoma ICE Processing Center (Northwest Detention Center)	Active (FY10 – FY20)	Tacoma, WA	WA	Private migrant detention center	CDF	GEO Group	739	1181	Female/Male
Tallahatchie County Correctional Facility	Active (FY19 – FY20)	Tutwiler, MS	MS	Jail	USMS IGA	CoreCivic	125		Male
Teller County Jail	Active (FY19 – FY20)	Divide, CO	CO	Jail	IGSA	County (Sheriff)	14		Female/Male
Tex Health Huguley Hospital	Active (FY20)	Burleson, TX	TX	Other	Other		0		Female/Male
Theo Lacy Facility	Closed (Active FY11 – FY19)	Orange, CA	CA	Jail	IGSA	County (Sheriff)	326	472	Male
Tornillo-Guadalupe POE	Closed (Active FY19)	Tornillo, TX	TX	Other	Other		538		Female/Male
Torrance County Detention Facility	Active (FY16 – FY20)	Estancia, NM	NM	Jail	IGSA	CoreCivic	207	714	Male
Tulsa County Jail (David L. Moss Justice Center)	Active (FY10 – FY19)	Tulsa, OK	OK	Jail	IGSA	County (Sheriff)	126		Female/Male
Val Verde Correctional Facility	Active (FY10 – FY20)	Del Rio, TX	TX	Jail	USMS IGA	GEO Group	1		Female/Male
Virginia Peninsula Regional Jail	Closed (Active FY14 – FY19)	Williamsburg, VA	VA	Jail	USMS IGA	County	45		Male
Wake County Sheriff Department	Closed (Active FY10 – FY19)	Raleigh, NC	NC	Jail	IGSA	County (Sheriff)	1		Female/Male
Wakulla County Jail	Active (FY10 – FY20)	Crawfordville, FL	FL	Jail	IGSA	Wakulla County Sheriff's Department	82		Male
Washington County Detention Center	Active (FY19 – FY20)	Fayetteville, AR	AR	Jail	USMS IGA		2		Female/Male
Washington County Jail (Purgatory Correctional Facility	Active (FY10 – FY20)	Hurricane, UT	UT	Jail	USMS IGA	County (Sheriff)	6	6	Female/Male
Washoe County Jail	Active (FY10 – FY20)	Reno, NV	NV	Jail	USMS IGA	Washoe County Sheriff's Office	14	86	Female/Male
Wayne County Jail	Closed (Active FY10 – FY17)	Lyons, NY	NY	Jail	USMS IGA	County (Sheriff)	2	19	Female
Webb County Detention Center (CCA)	Active (FY17 – FY20)	Laredo, TX	TX	Dedicated migrant detention center	DIGSA	CoreCivic	78	300	Female/Male
West Texas Detention Facility	Closed (Active FY10 – FY19)	Sierra Blanca, TX	TX	Jail	USMS IGA	LaSalle Corrections	590	450	Female/Male
Western Tennessee Detention Facility	Active (FY10 – FY19)	Mason, TN	TN	Jail	USMS IGA	CoreCivic	3	20	Female/Male
Whitfield County Jail	Active (FY11 – FY19)	Dalton, GA	GA	Jail	IGSA	County (Sheriff)	2		Female/Male
Willacy County Regional Detention Facility	Closed (Active FY14 – FY17)	Raymondville, TX	TX	Jail	USMS IGA	Management & Training Corp (MTC)	39		Male
Winn Correctional Center	Active (FY19 – FY20)	Winnfield, LA	LA	Dedicated migrant detention center	DIGSA	LaSalle Corrections	1035	946	Male
Worcester County Jail	Active (FY10 – FY20)	Snow Hill, MD	MD	Jail	IGSA	Worcester County	80		Female/Male
Wyatt Detention Center	Active (FY19 – FY20)	Central Falls, RI	RI	Jail	USMS IGA	Central Falls Detention Facility Corp.	69		Male
Yakima County Department of Corrections	Closed (Active FY10 – FY19)	Yakima, WA	WA	Jail	USMS IGA	County (Corrections)	4		Female/Male
Yankton County Jail	Active (FY19 – FY20)	Yankton, SD	SD	Jail	USMS IGA		1		Female/Male
York County Detention Center	Closed (Active FY10 – FY17)	York, SC	SC	Jail	USMS IGA	County (Sheriff)	43	70	Male
York County Prison	Active (FY10 – FY20)	York, PA	PA	Jail	IGSA	York County Department of Prisons	397	500	Female/Male
Yuba County Jail	Active (FY10 – FY20)	Marysville, CA	CA	Jail	IGSA	Yuba County Sheriff's Department	122	150	Female/Male

Data from ICE Detention Management spreadsheets (except where cited otherwise), with all current data from Fiscal years 2019 and 2020, from the ICE DMCP facility listing for Fiscal year 2017, and status sourced from presence or absence in prior years' data.
