= List of immigration detention sites in the United States, 2010-2016 =

List of sites used by US Immigration and Customs Enforcement for detaining noncitizens

This is a list of migration-related detention sites in the United States active from federal Fiscal Years 2010 to 2016.

== Centers active in Fiscal Years 2010 through 2016 ==
ICE Detention Facilities in FY10–FY16
Facility Name	Status (year)	City	State	Facility Type	Authority	Management	Average Daily Population	Minimum Capacity	Demographics
Adelanto ICE processing center	Active (FY11 – FY16)	Adelanto, CA	CA	Dedicated migrant detention center	DIGSA	GEO Group	1472	1940	Female/Male
Albany County Jail	Active (FY10 – FY16)	Albany, NY	NY	Jail	USMS IGA	New York State Commission of Correction	29	14	Female/Male
Alexandria City Jail	Active (FY15 – FY16)	Alexandria, VA	VA	Jail	USMS IGA	Alexandria Sheriff's Office	1		Female/Male
Alhambra City Jail	Closed (Active FY10 – FY14)	Alhambra, CA	CA	Jail	USMS IGA		0		Female/Male
Allegany County Jail	Active (FY10 – FY16)	Belmont, NY	NY	Jail	IGSA	County (Sheriff)	12		Female
Allegheny County Jail	Closed (Active FY10 – FY14)	Pittsburgh, PA	PA	Jail	USMS IGA	Allegheny County Bureau of Corrections	4		Female/Male
Allen Parish Public Safety Complex	Active (FY16)	Oberlin, LA	LA	Jail	IGSA	County	18		Male
Anchorage Correctional Complex	Active (FY10 – FY12)	Anchorage, AK	AK	Jail	USMS IGA	County (Corrections)	1		Female/Male
Apache County Jail	Closed (Active FY12 – FY13)	St Johns, AZ	AZ	Jail	USMS IGA		0		Female/Male
Atlanta City Detention Center	Active (FY10 – FY16)	Atlanta, GA	GA	Jail	USMS IGA	City	139	200	Female/Male
Baker County Sheriff's Office	Active (FY10 – FY16)	Macclenny, FL	FL	Jail	IGSA	County	188		Female/Male
Baldwin County Correctional Center	Active (FY11 – FY16)	Bay Minette, AL	AL	Jail	IGSA	County (Sheriff)	2		Male
Bedford Heights City Jail	Closed (Active FY10 – FY15)	Bedford Hts, OH	OH	Jail	IGSA	Bedford Heights Police Department	0		Male
Bedford Municipal Detention Center	Active (FY10 – FY16)	Bedford, TX	TX	Jail	IGSA	City	16		Female/Male
Bergen County Jail	Active (FY10 – FY16)	Hackensack, NJ	NJ	Jail	USMS IGA	County (Sheriff)	147	128	Male
Boone County Jail	Active (FY10 – FY16)	Burlington, KY	KY	Jail	USMS IGA	Boone County Sheriff's Department	142	200	Female/Male
Bristol County Detention Center	Active (FY10 – FY16)	North Dartmouth, MA	MA	Jail	IGSA	County (Sheriff)	116		Female/Male
Brooks County Detention Center	Active (FY12 – FY16)	Falfurrias, TX	TX	Jail	USMS IGA	GEO Group	23	200	Male
Broward Transitional Center	Active (FY10 – FY16)	Pompano Beach, FL	FL	Private migrant detention center	CDF	GEO Group	618	700	Female/Male
Buffalo (Batavia) Service Processing Center	Active (FY10 – FY16)	Batavia, NY	NY	ICE migrant detention center	SPC	Ahtna Global Services	540	650	Male
Burnet County Jail	Active (FY14 – FY16)	Burnet, TX	TX	Jail	IGSA	County (Sheriff)	1		Female/Male
Butler County Jail	Active (FY10 – FY16)	El Dorado, KS	KS	Jail	USMS IGA	County (Sheriff)	5	25	Female/Male
Butler County Jail	Active (FY10 – FY16)	Hamilton, OH	OH	Jail	IGSA	County (Sheriff)	81		Female/Male
Cabarrus County Jail	Active (FY10 – FY11)	Concord, NC	NC	Jail	IGSA	County (Sheriff)	1		Male
Caldwell County Detention Center	Active (FY10 – FY16)	Kingston, MO	MO	Jail	IGSA	Caldwell County Sheriff's Office	21		Female/Male
Calhoun County Correctional Center	Active (FY10 – FY16)	Battle Creek, MI	MI	Jail	IGSA	County (Sheriff)	148	125	Female/Male
Cambria County Jail	Active (FY16)	Ebensburg, PA	PA	Jail	USMS IGA	Cambria County	4	15	Male
Carver County Jail	Active (FY10 – FY16)	Chaska, MN	MN	Jail	IGSA	Carver County Sheriff's Office	29		Female/Male
Cascade County Jail (Montana)	Active (FY10 – FY16)	Great Falls, MT	MT	Jail	USMS IGA	County (Sheriff)	1	35	Male
Cass County Jail	Active (FY10 – FY16)	Plattsmouth, NE	NE	Jail	USMS IGA	County (Sheriff)	6	50	Female/Male
CCA Central Arizona Detention Center	Closed (Active FY10 – FY15)	Florence, AZ	AZ	Jail	USMS IGA	CoreCivic	32	230	Male
Central Arizona Florence Correctional Complex	Active (FY10 – FY16)	Florence, AZ	AZ	Jail	USMS IGA	CoreCivic	712	806	Male
Central Texas Detention Facility	Active (FY10 – FY14)	San Antonio, TX	TX	Jail	USMS IGA	GEO Group	1		Male
Charleston County Detention Center	Active (FY10 – FY16)	North Charleston, SC	SC	Jail	USMS IGA	County (Sheriff)	9	256	Male
Chase County Detention Facility	Active (FY10 – FY16)	Cottonwood Falls, KS	KS	Jail	IGSA	County (Sheriff)	44		Female/Male
Chautauqua County Jail	Active (FY12 – FY16)	Mayville, NY	NY	Jail	IGSA	County (Sheriff)	5		Female
Chippewa County SSM	Active (FY10 – FY16)	Sault Sainte Marie, MI	MI	Jail	IGSA	County (Sheriff)	18		Female/Male
Christian County Jail	Active (FY10 – FY16)	Ozark, MO	MO	Jail	IGSA	County (Sheriff)	13		Male
Clay County Jail	Active (FY13 – FY16)	Brazil, IN	IN	Jail	USMS IGA	County (Sheriff)	53		Male
Clinton County Correctional Facility	Active (FY10 – FY16)	Lock Haven, PA	PA	Jail	USMS IGA	County (Corrections)	12	50	Female/Male
Clinton County Jail	Active (FY10 – FY16)	Plattsburgh, NY	NY	Jail	USMS IGA	County (Sheriff)	14	13	Female/Male
Coastal Bend Detention Facility	Active (FY12 – FY15)	Robstown, TX	TX	Jail	USMS IGA	GEO Group	41	700	Male
Cobb County Jail	Active (FY10 – FY16)	Marietta, GA	GA	Jail	IGSA	County (Sheriff)	1		Male
Coconino County Detention Facility	Closed (Active FY10)	Flagstaff, AZ	AZ	Jail	USMS IGA		0		Female/Male
Collier County Naples Jail Center	Active (FY10 – FY16)	Naples, FL	FL	Jail	IGSA	County (Sheriff)	4		Male
Contra Costa County Jail West	Active (FY10 – FY16)	Richmond, CA	CA	Jail	USMS IGA	County (Sheriff)	196	318	Female/Male
Cumberland County Jail	Active (FY10 – FY16)	Portland, ME	ME	Jail	USMS IGA	County (Sheriff)	1	70	Male
Dakota County Jail	Active (FY16)	Dakota City, NE	NE	Jail	USMS IGA	County (Sheriff)	1	20	Female/Male
Dale G. Haile Detention Center	Closed (Active FY13)	Caldwell, ID	ID	Jail	IGSA	Canyon County Sheriff's Office	1		Male
Davidson County Sheriff	Active (FY10 – FY16)	Nashville, TN	TN	Jail	IGSA	County (Sheriff)	4		Male
Dearborn Police Department	Active (FY10 – FY16)	Dearborn, MI	MI	Jail	IGSA	Dearborn Police Department	2	8	Female/Male
Dekalb County Detention Center	Active (FY10 – FY16)	Fort Payne, AL	AL	Jail	USMS IGA	County (Sheriff)	22	60	Female/Male
Delaney Hall Detention Facility	Active (FY11 – FY15)	Newark, NJ	NJ	Jail	IGSA		126		Female/Male
Delaware County Jail (George W. Hill)	Active (FY16)	Thornton, PA	PA	Jail	USMS IGA	County	1		Female/Male
Denver Contract Detention Facility (aka Aurora ICE Processing Center)	Active (FY10 – FY16)	Aurora, CO	CO	Private migrant detention center	CDF	GEO Group	477	928	Female/Male
Dodge County Jail	Active (FY10 – FY16)	Juneau, WI	WI	Jail	USMS IGA	Dodge County Sheriff's Department	199	265	Female/Male
Douglas County Department of Corrections	Active (FY10 – FY16)	Omaha, NE	NE	Jail	IGSA	County (Corrections)	82		Female/Male
East Hidalgo Detention Center	Active (FY12 – FY16)	La Villa, TX	TX	Jail	USMS IGA	GEO Group	128	100	Male
Eastern Regional Jail	Closed (Active FY10 – FY14)	Martinsburg, WV	WV	Jail	USMS IGA		0		Female/Male
El Paso County Criminal Justice Center	Active (FY10 – FY16)	Colorado Springs, CO	CO	Jail	IGSA	County (Sheriff)	6		Female/Male
El Paso Service Processing Center	Active (FY10 – FY16)	El Paso, TX	TX	ICE migrant detention center	SPC	ICE	819	840	Female/Male
Elgin Police Department	Active (FY10 – FY16)	Elgin, IL	IL	Jail	IGSA	City	1		Male
Elizabeth Detention Center	Active (FY10 – FY16)	Elizabeth, NJ	NJ	Private migrant detention center	CDF	CoreCivic	295	304	Female/Male
Elmore County Jail	Active (FY10 – FY16)	Mountain Home, ID	ID	Jail	USMS IGA	County (Sheriff)	5	15	Male
Eloy Detention Center	Active (FY10 – FY16)	Eloy, AZ	AZ	Dedicated migrant detention center	DIGSA	CoreCivic	1433	1550	Female/Male
Erie County Jail	Active (FY10 – FY16)	Erie, PA	PA	Jail	USMS IGA	Erie County Sheriff's Office	3	5	Male
Essex County Correctional Facility	Active (FY10 – FY16)	Newark, NJ	NJ	Jail	IGSA	County (Corrections)	539	800	Male
Etowah County Jail (Alabama)	Active (FY10 – FY16)	Gadsden, AL	AL	Jail	USMS IGA	Etowah County Sheriff's Department	278	350	Male
Euless City Jail	Active (FY10 – FY16)	Euless, TX	TX	Jail	IGSA	City	18		Female/Male
Fayette County Detention Center	Active (FY16)	Lexington, KY	KY	Jail	USMS IGA	County	1		Female/Male
Florence Service Processing Center	Active (FY10 – FY16)	Florence, AZ	AZ	ICE migrant detention center	SPC	Asset Protection & Security Services	387	392	Male
Forsyth County Jail	Active (FY13 – FY16)	Winston-Salem, NC	NC	Jail	USMS IGA	County (Sheriff)	1		Male
Franklin County House of Correction	Active (FY10 – FY16)	Greenfield, MA	MA	Jail	USMS IGA	Franklin County Sheriff's Office	71	90	Male
Frederick County Detention Center	Active (FY10 – FY16)	Frederick, MD	MD	Jail	IGSA	County (Sheriff)	39		Male
Freeborn County Adult Detention Center	Active (FY10 – FY16)	Albert Lea, MN	MN	Jail	IGSA	County (Sheriff)	61		Male
Garvin County Detention Center	Active (FY10 – FY16)	Pauls Valley, OK	OK	Jail	IGSA	County (Sheriff)	1		Male
Gaston County Jail	Active (FY10 – FY11)	Gastonia, NC	NC	Jail	IGSA	County (Sheriff)	1		Male
Geauga County Jail	Active (FY11 – FY16)	Chardon, OH	OH	Jail	USMS IGA	County (Sheriff)	38	30	Female/Male
Glades County Detention Center	Active (FY10 – FY16)	Moore Haven, FL	FL	Jail	IGSA	Glades County Sheriff's Department	130		Female/Male
Glendale Police Department	Closed (Active FY10 – FY11)	Glendale, CA	CA	Jail	IGSA	City	1		Male
Grand Forks County Correctional Facility	Active (FY10 – FY16)	Grand Forks, ND	ND	Jail	IGSA	County (Sheriff)	3		Female/Male
Grayson County Jail	Active (FY11 – FY16)	Leitchfield, KY	KY	Jail	USMS IGA	County (Jailer)	1	10	Female/Male
Hall County Department of Corrections	Active (FY10 – FY16)	Grand Island, NE	NE	Jail	IGSA	County (Sheriff)	14		Male
Hall County Jail	Active (FY10 – FY16)	Gainesville, GA	GA	Jail	USMS IGA	Corrections Corporation of America	2		Male
Hardin County Jail	Active (FY10 – FY16)	Eldora, IA	IA	Jail	IGSA	County (Sheriff)	45		Female/Male
Henderson Detention Center	Active (FY11 – FY16)	Henderson, NV	NV	Jail	USMS IGA	City	240	300	Female/Male
Houston Processing Center	Active (FY10 – FY16)	Houston, TX	TX	Private migrant detention center	CDF	CoreCivic	916	1000	Female/Male
Howard County Detention Center	Active (FY10 – FY16)	Jessup, MD	MD	Jail	IGSA	County (Corrections)	60		Male
Hudson County Correctional Center	Active (FY10 – FY16)	Kearny, NJ	NJ	Jail	USMS IGA	County (Corrections)	491	476	Female/Male
Immigration Centers of America Farmville	Active (FY10 – FY16)	Farmville, VA	VA	Dedicated migrant detention center	DIGSA	Virginia Department of Corrections	579	851	Male
Imperial Regional Detention Facility	Active (FY14 – FY16)	Calexico, CA	CA	Dedicated migrant detention center	DIGSA	Management & Training Corporation (MTC)	681	704	Female/Male
Irwin County Detention Center	Active (FY11 – FY16)	Ocilla, GA	GA	Jail	USMS IGA	LaSalle Corrections	546	512	Female/Male
Jack Harwell Detention Center	Active (FY11 – FY14)	Waco, TX	TX	Jail	USMS IGA	Community Education Centers (GEO Group subsidiary)	129	200	Male
James A. Musick Facility	Active (FY11 – FY16)	Irvine, CA	CA	Jail	IGSA	County (Sheriff)	290		Female/Male
Jefferson County Jail	Active (FY10 – FY16)	Rigby, ID	ID	Jail	IGSA	County	1		Male
Jena/Lasalle Detention Facility	Active (FY10 – FY16)	Jena, LA	LA	Dedicated migrant detention center	DIGSA	GEO Group	1105	1160	Female/Male
Joe Corley Detention Facility	Active (FY10 – FY16)	Conroe, TX	TX	Jail	IGSA	GEO Group	894	1050	Female/Male
Johnson County Law Enforcement Center	Active (FY10 – FY16)	Cleburne, TX	TX	Jail	IGSA	Community Education Centers (GEO Group subsidiary)	216		Male
Josephine County Jail	Active (FY10 – FY16)	Grants Pass, OR	OR	Jail	USMS IGA	Josephine County Sheriff's Department	1	31	Male
Karnes County Correctional Center	Active (FY16)	Karnes City, TX	TX	Jail	USMS IGA	GEO Group	20	60	Male
Kenosha County Detention Center	Active (FY10 – FY16)	Kenosha, WI	WI	Jail	USMS IGA	Kenosha County Sheriff's Department	166	210	Female/Male
Kent County Jail	Closed (Active FY14)	Grand Rapids, MI	MI	Jail	IGSA	County (Sheriff)	1		Female/Male
Krome North Service Processing Center	Active (FY10 – FY16)	Miami, FL	FL	ICE migrant detention center	SPC	Akima (division of NANA Regional Corporation)	558	611	Male
La Paz County Adult Detention Facility	Active (FY14 – FY15)	Parker, AZ	AZ	Jail	USMS IGA	County (Sheriff)	1		Female/Male
La Plata County Jail	Closed (Active FY10 – FY15)	Durango, CO	CO	Jail	USMS IGA		0		Female/Male
La Salle County Regional Detention Center	Active (FY11 – FY16)	Encinal, TX	TX	Jail	USMS IGA	County	35	250	Female/Male
Laredo Processing Center	Active (FY10 – FY16)	Laredo, TX	TX	Jail	USMS IGA	CoreCivic	301	400	Female
Lexington County Jail	Active (FY11 – FY16)	Lexington, SC	SC	Jail	USMS IGA	County (Sheriff)	2	28	Male
Lincoln County Detention Center	Active (FY10 – FY16)	Troy, MO	MO	Jail	IGSA	Lincoln County Sheriff's Office	7		Female/Male
Linn County Jail	Active (FY10 – FY16)	Cedar Rapids, IA	IA	Jail	USMS IGA	Linn County Sheriff	3	25	Female/Male
Lonoke Police Department	Active (FY10 – FY16)	Lonoke, AR	AR	Jail	IGSA	City	1		Female/Male
Lubbock County Detention Center	Active (FY16)	Lubbock, TX	TX	Jail	USMS IGA	County (Sheriff)	1	15	Male
Marion County Jail	Active (FY10 – FY16)	Indianapolis, IN	IN	Jail	USMS IGA	County (Sheriff)	1	5	Female/Male
Marshall County Jail	Active (FY11 – FY16)	Marshalltown, IA	IA	Jail	USMS IGA	County (Sheriff)	31	35	Female/Male
McHenry County Correctional Facility	Active (FY10 – FY16)	Woodstock, IL	IL	Jail	USMS IGA	McHenry County Sheriff	207	250	Female/Male
Mecklenburg County Detention Center North	Active (FY10 – FY16)	Charlotte, NC	NC	Jail	USMS IGA	Mecklenburg County Sheriff's Department	1		Female/Male
Mesa Verde Detention Facility	Active (FY15 – FY16)	Bakersfield, CA	CA	Dedicated migrant detention center	DIGSA	GEO Group	368	400	Female/Male
Miller County Jail	Active (FY16)	Texarkana, AR	AR	Jail	USMS IGA	County (Sheriff)	1	13	Male
Minicassia Detention Center	Active (FY10 – FY16)	Burley, ID	ID	Jail	IGSA	County (Sheriff)	3		Male
Mississippi County Detention Center	Closed (Active FY10 – FY15)	Charleston, MO	MO	Jail	IGSA	Mississippi County Sheriff's Office	3		Male
Moffat County Jail	Closed (Active FY10 – FY13)	Craig, CO	CO	Jail	IGSA	County (Sheriff)	1		Male
Monroe County Detention Center	Active (FY10 – FY16)	Key West, FL	FL	Jail	IGSA	Monroe County Sheriff's Department	52	72	Male
Monroe County Detention-Dorm	Active (FY14 – FY16)	Monroe, MI	MI	Jail	IGSA	County (Sheriff)	51		Male
Montgomery City Jail	Active (FY11 – FY16)	Montgomery, AL	AL	Jail	IGSA	City	1		Female/Male
Montgomery County Correctional Facility	Closed (Active FY10 – FY15)	Norristown, PA	PA	Jail	USMS IGA	Montgomery County Sheriff's Department	2		Female/Male
Montgomery County Jail	Active (FY10 – FY16)	Montgomery City, MO	MO	Jail	IGSA	Montgomery County Sheriff's Office	18		Male
Morgan County Adult Detention Center	Active (FY10 – FY16)	Versailles, MO	MO	Jail	IGSA	Morgan County Sheriff's Office	51		Male
Morrow County Correctional Facility	Active (FY10 – FY16)	Mount Gilead, OH	OH	Jail	IGSA	County (Sheriff)	29		Female/Male
Natrona County Jail	Active (FY10 – FY11)	Casper, WY	WY	Jail	USMS IGA	County (Sheriff)	1		Male
Navajo County Sheriff	Closed (Active FY10 – FY13)	Holbrook, AZ	AZ	Jail	IGSA		0		Female/Male
Nevada Southern Detention Center	Active (FY16)	Pahrump, NV	NV	Jail	USMS IGA	CoreCivic	74	250	Female/Male
New Hanover County Jail	Active (FY13 – FY14)	Castle Hayne, NC	NC	Jail	IGSA	County (Sheriff)	1		Male
Nobles County Jail	Active (FY10 – FY16)	Worthington, MN	MN	Jail	IGSA	County (Sheriff)	1		Female/Male
Norfolk County Jail	Closed (Active FY10 – FY15)	Dedham, MA	MA	Jail	USMS IGA	County (Sheriff)	1	50	Female/Male
Northern Oregon Correctional Facility	Active (FY10 – FY16)	The Dalles, OR	OR	Jail	IGSA	County (Jailer)	14		Female/Male
Northwest Detention Center	Active (FY10 – FY16)	Tacoma, WA	WA	Private migrant detention center	CDF	GEO Group	1411	1575	Female/Male
Northwest State Correctional Center	Active (FY14)	Swanton, VT	VT	Jail	USMS IGA	County (Corrections)	1		Male
Oldham County Jail	Active (FY15 – FY16)	La Grange, KY	KY	Jail	IGSA	County (Jailer)	1		Female/Male
Ontario County Jail	Closed (Active FY10 – FY15)	Canandaigua, NY	NY	Jail	USMS IGA		1		Female/Male
Orange County Intake Release Facility	Closed (Active FY11 – FY12)	Santa Ana, CA	CA	Jail	IGSA	County (Sheriff)	1		Female/Male
Orange County Jail	Active (FY15 – FY16)	Orlando, FL	FL	Jail	USMS IGA	Orange County Sheriff's Department	1	5	Female/Male
Orange County Jail	Active (FY10 – FY16)	Goshen, NY	NY	Jail	IGSA	County (Corrections)	172		Female/Male
Otay Mesa Detention Center (San Diego CDF)	Active (FY10 – FY16)	San Diego, CA	CA	Private migrant detention center	USMS CDF	CoreCivic	835	896	Female/Male
Otero County Prison Facility	Active (FY10 – FY14)	Chaparral, NM	NM	Jail	USMS IGA	Management & Training Corp (MTC)	15		Female/Male
Otero County Processing Center	Active (FY10 – FY16)	Chaparral, NM	NM	Dedicated migrant detention center	DIGSA	Management & Training Corporation (MTC)	844	1000	Male
Pennington County Jail (South Dakota)	Active (FY10)	Rapid City, SD	SD	Jail	USMS IGA	County (Sheriff)	1	5	Male
Phelps County Jail	Active (FY10 – FY16)	Holdrege, NE	NE	Jail	USMS IGA	County (Sheriff)	3	20	Male
Pike County Correctional Facility	Active (FY10 – FY16)	Lords Valley, PA	PA	Jail	IGSA	County (Sheriff)	169		Male
Pine Prairie Correctional Center	Active (FY16)	Pine Prairie, LA	LA	Dedicated migrant detention center	DIGSA	LCS Corrections Services	479	700	Male
Pinellas County Jail	Active (FY10 – FY14)	Clearwater, FL	FL	Jail	USMS IGA	County (Sheriff)	1	5	Male
Platte County Detention Center	Active (FY16)	Platte City, MO	MO	Jail	IGSA	County (Sheriff)	1		Female/Male
Platte County Jail	Active (FY10 – FY15)	Wheatland, WY	WY	Jail	USMS IGA		0		Female/Male
Plymouth County Correctional Facility	Active (FY10 – FY16)	Plymouth, MA	MA	Jail	IGSA	Plymouth County	86		Male
Polk County Adult Detention Facility	Active (FY10 – FY16)	Livingston, TX	TX	Jail	IGSA	Polk County Sheriff's Office	563	1054	Male
Polk County Jail	Active (FY10 – FY16)	Des Moines, IA	IA	Jail	USMS IGA	County (Sheriff)	3	60	Female/Male
Pomona City Jail	Closed (Active FY10 – FY14)	Pomona, CA	CA	Jail	USMS IGA		0		Female/Male
Port Isabel	Active (FY10 – FY16)	Los Fresnos, TX	TX	ICE migrant detention center	SPC	Ahtna Global Services	1104	1175	Female/Male
Pottawattamie County Jail	Active (FY10 – FY16)	Council Bluffs, IA	IA	Jail	USMS IGA	Pottawattamie County Sheriff	12	10	Male
Pueblo County Jail	Closed (Active FY10 – FY13)	Pueblo, CO	CO	Jail	USMS IGA		0		Female/Male
Pulaski County Jail	Active (FY10 – FY16)	Ullin, IL	IL	Jail	IGSA	GEO Group	102		Female/Male
Ramsey County Adult Detention Center	Active (FY10 – FY16)	St. Paul, MN	MN	Jail	USMS IGA	Ramsey County Sheriff's Office	11	15	Female/Male
Randall County Jail	Active (FY10 – FY16)	Amarillo, TX	TX	Jail	USMS IGA	County (Sheriff)	1	40	Female/Male
Rice County Detention Center	Closed (Active FY10 – FY14)	Lyons, KS	KS	Jail	IGSA		1		Female/Male
Rio Cosumnes Correctional. Center	Active (FY14 – FY16)	Elk Grove, CA	CA	Jail	IGSA	County (Sheriff)	136		Male
Rio Grande Detention Center	Active (FY14 – FY16)	Laredo, TX	TX	Jail	USMS IGA	GEO Group	476	672	Male
Roanoke City Jail	Active (FY15 – FY16)	Roanoke, VA	VA	Jail	IGSA	City	1		Male
Rock Island County Correctional Center	Active (FY10 – FY16)	Rock Island, IL	IL	Jail	USMS IGA	County (Sheriff)	1	20	Male
Rolling Plains Detention Center	Active (FY10 – FY16)	Haskell, TX	TX	Jail	IGSA	LaSalle Corrections	490	525	Female/Male
Saint Clair County Jail	Active (FY10 – FY16)	Port Huron, MI	MI	Jail	IGSA	County (Sheriff)	69		Female/Male
Saint Tammany Parish Jail	Active (FY12 – FY16)	Covington, LA	LA	Jail	IGSA	County (Sheriff)	4		Female/Male
San Bernardino County Jail	Closed (Active FY10 – FY13)	San Bernardino, CA	CA	Jail	USMS IGA		0		Female/Male
San Luis Regional Detention Center	Active (FY13 – FY16)	San Luis, AZ	AZ	Jail	USMS IGA	LaSalle Corrections	101	400	Female/Male
Sangamon County Jail	Closed (Active FY12 – FY14)	Springfield, IL	IL	Jail	USMS IGA	County (Sheriff)	1	10	Male
Santa Ana City Jail	Closed (Active FY10 – FY15)	Santa Ana, CA	CA	Jail	IGSA	City of Santa Ana	161		Female/Male
Sebastian County Detention Center	Active (FY10 – FY16)	Fort Smith, AR	AR	Jail	USMS IGA	County (Sheriff)	1	20	Male
Seneca County Jail	Active (FY10 – FY16)	Tiffin, OH	OH	Jail	IGSA	Seneca County Sheriff's Office	49		Female/Male
Shawnee County Department of Corrections	Active (FY16)	Topeka, KS	KS	Jail	IGSA	County (Corrections)	3		Female/Male
Sherburne County Jail	Active (FY10 – FY16)	Elk River, MN	MN	Jail	USMS IGA	Sherburne County Sheriff's Department	127	120	Female/Male
South Central Regional Jail	Active (FY10 – FY16)	Charleston, WV	WV	Jail	USMS IGA	County (Corrections)	6	5	Male
South Louisiana Detention Center	Active (FY10 – FY15)	Basile, LA	LA	Jail	IGSA		578		Male
South Texas Detention Complex	Active (FY10 – FY16)	Pearsall, TX	TX	Private migrant detention center	CDF	GEO Group	1728	1890	Female/Male
Stewart Detention Center	Active (FY10 – FY16)	Lumpkin, GA	GA	Dedicated migrant detention center	DIGSA	CoreCivic	1369	1966	Male
Strafford County Corrections	Active (FY10 – FY16)	Dover, NH	NH	Jail	IGSA	County (Corrections)	67		Female/Male
Suffolk County House of Corrections	Active (FY10 – FY16)	Boston, MA	MA	Jail	IGSA	County (Sheriff)	192		Female/Male
Sweetwater County Jail	Active (FY10 – FY14)	Rock Springs, WY	WY	Jail	USMS IGA		0		Female/Male
Teller County Jail	Active (FY10 – FY16)	Divide, CO	CO	Jail	IGSA	County (Sheriff)	10		Female/Male
Tensas Parish Detention Center	Closed (Active FY10 – FY15)	Waterproof, LA	LA	Jail	IGSA	Emerald Correctional Management	49		Male
Theo Lacy Facility	Active (FY11 – FY16)	Orange, CA	CA	Jail	IGSA	County (Sheriff)	448	472	Male
Torrance County Detention Facility	Active (FY16)	Estancia, NM	NM	Jail	USMS IGA	CoreCivic	45	300	Female/Male
Tulsa County Jail (David L. Moss Justice Center)	Active (FY10 – FY16)	Tulsa, OK	OK	Jail	IGSA	County (Sheriff)	132		Female/Male
Utah County Jail	Closed (Active FY10 – FY15)	Spanish Fork, UT	UT	Jail	IGSA		164		Female/Male
Val Verde Correctional Facility	Active (FY10 – FY16)	Del Rio, TX	TX	Jail	USMS IGA	GEO Group	9		Female/Male
Virginia Peninsula Regional Jail	Active (FY14 – FY16)	Williamsburg, VA	VA	Jail	USMS IGA	County	50		Female/Male
Wake County Sheriff Department	Active (FY10 – FY16)	Raleigh, NC	NC	Jail	IGSA	County (Sheriff)	3		Male
Wakulla County Jail	Active (FY10 – FY16)	Crawfordville, FL	FL	Jail	IGSA	Wakulla County Sheriff's Department	62		Male
Washington County Jail (Purgatory Correctiona	Active (FY10 – FY16)	Hurricane, UT	UT	Jail	USMS IGA	County (Sheriff)	3	6	Male
Washoe County Jail	Active (FY10 – FY16)	Reno, NV	NV	Jail	USMS IGA	Washoe County Sheriff's Office	14	86	Male
Wayne County Jail	Active (FY10 – FY16)	Lyons, NY	NY	Jail	USMS IGA	County (Sheriff)	4	19	Female
West Texas Detention Facility	Active (FY10 – FY16)	Sierra Blanca, TX	TX	Jail	USMS IGA	LaSalle Corrections	452	450	Female/Male
Western Tennessee Detention Facility	Active (FY10 – FY16)	Mason, TN	TN	Jail	USMS IGA	CoreCivic	3	20	Male
Whitfield County Jail	Active (FY11 – FY16)	Dalton, GA	GA	Jail	IGSA	County (Sheriff)	1		Male
Willacy County Regional Detention Facility	Active (FY14 – FY16)	Raymondville, TX	TX	Jail	USMS IGA	Management & Training Corp (MTC)	23		Male
Worcester County Jail	Active (FY10 – FY16)	Snow Hill, MD	MD	Jail	IGSA	Worcester County	165		Female/Male
Yakima County Department of Corrections	Active (FY10 – FY16)	Yakima, WA	WA	Jail	USMS IGA	County (Corrections)	8		Male
Yavapai County Detention Center	Closed (Active FY10 – FY13)	Camp Verde, AZ	AZ	Jail	IGSA	County (Sheriff)	1		Female/Male
York County Detention Center	Active (FY10 – FY16)	York, SC	SC	Jail	USMS IGA	County (Sheriff)	28	70	Male
York County Prison	Active (FY10 – FY16)	York, PA	PA	Jail	IGSA	York County Department of Prisons	671	800	Female/Male
Yuba County Jail	Active (FY10 – FY16)	Marysville, CA	CA	Jail	IGSA	Yuba County Sheriff's Department	189		Female/Male

Data from ICE DMCP facility authorization listings (except where cited otherwise), with all current data from Fiscal years 2010 through 2016, and status sourced from presence or absence in prior years' data.
