= COVID-19 pandemic in U.S. immigration detention =

The COVID-19 pandemic in U.S. immigration detention has been covered extensively since the onset of the COVID-19 pandemic in the United States. More than 38,000 people were detained by U.S. Immigration and Customs Enforcement (ICE) at the time of the outbreak of COVID-19 in the United States. ICE's response to the outbreak in detention facilities has been widely characterized as substandard and dangerous. Harmful practices have been reported in numerous facilities managed by third-party private contractors with ICE. For example, reports found that HDQ Neutral disinfectant was used over 50 times per day in un-ventilated areas, which caused pain, bleeding, and severe illness to numerous people held in Adelanto Detention Center, a private prison managed by GEO Group Inc.

ICE and the Trump administration have been heavily criticized for its lack of transparency during the COVID-19 pandemic, after it banned oversight tours by U.S. Congress and stakeholder groups at all detention facilities and further restricted attorney access. Detained people have reported that they are being forced into unsafe, unsanitary, and harmful conditions. People who are critically ill have been denied testing and medical attention by detention officers. Serious irregularities in ICE's testing data have been reported, while ICE has blocked coronavirus testing information at its facilities from being released to the public. The American Civil Liberties Union referred to the COVID-19 pandemic in US immigration detention as "an unquestionable public health disaster."

== Conditions ==
The conditions of immigration detention facilities in the United States have been identified as contributing to the spread of COVID-19. Sources recognized that ICE (1) provided "dangerously substandard" medical care, (2) lacked transparency, accountability, and oversight, (3) engaged in frequent transfers of detainees between facilities, and (4) had crowded housing with a lack basic access to soap or masks. ICE's notoriously poor handling of previous outbreaks in their facilities, such as a 2018 mumps outbreak, which began with fives cases at two Texas detention facilities before spreading to 57 facilities in 19 states, have been cited as a proven track record. A study in the Journal of Urban Health projected that 72 percent of those in immigration detention would be infected with the coronavirus 90 days after a detention center had five infected cases as an optimistic projection, and that about 100 percent of the population would be infected as a pessimistic projection.

== Deaths ==
Sources report that ICE may not be accurately reporting infections or deaths from COVID-19, citing ICE's handling of previous outbreaks. Two deaths have been reported.

- On May 6, the death of Carlos Ernesto Escobar Mejía, a 57-year-old Salvadoran man, was widely reported. Escobar Mejia was the first immigrant to die from COVID-19 in the custody of ICE and the 11th immigrant to die in government custody in the fiscal year. Escobar Mejía was denied bond on April 15, when he was "still well," by immigration judge Lee O'Connor, which is credited as resulting in his death. Senator Dianne Feinstein called for a federal investigation into the conditions at Otay Mesa detention center, managed by CoreCivic, a private prison corporation, where Escobar Mejía had been detained. ICE and the United States Department of Homeland Security were criticized for their actions and an investigation was called regarding Escobar Mejia's death.
- On May 24, Santiago Baten-Oxlaj, a 34-year-old man from Guatemala died at Piedmont Regional Hospital after being transferred from the Stewart Detention Center, a private prison run also run by CoreCivic under contract with ICE. Baten-Oxlaj had been granted a voluntary departure to Guatemala, and was awaiting departure from the United States at the time of his death. His death prompted human rights groups to call for the release of all people detained by ICE.

== Timeline ==
=== March ===
In March, ICE reportedly began to assess "vulnerable" detainees, including those over 60 or pregnant. However, at the end of March it was reported that "the agency has not changed its detention practices in response to the pandemic." On March 31, a federal judge ordered the immediate release of ten chronically ill immigrants in government custody, saying that it would be "unconscionable and possibly barbaric" to keep them detained. U.S. district Judge John E. Jones III agreed with activist demands, stating that conditions in US immigration detention facilities, in which people "are unable to keep socially distant while detained by ICE and cannot keep the detention facilities sufficiently clean to combat the spread of the virus" will cause "a very real risk of serious, lasting illness or death." At this time, ICE had already found that four immigrants in New Jersey jails had tested positive for COVID-19.

=== April ===
On April 9, detained men and women at the Irwin County Detention Center, in south Georgia, began organizing a protest to raise awareness of the harmful conditions they were being forcefully kept under as the threat of COVID-19 spread throughout ICE detention facilities.

Between February 3 and April 24, 2020, ICE carried out 232 deportation flights to Latin America and Caribbean countries, which contributed to the spread of COVID-19. In an article published in The Washington Post, it was reported that the US was "sending infected migrants back to vulnerable countries," including Mexico, Haiti, El Salvador, and Guatemala. It was later confirmed that some of these migrants had tested positive. In Mexico, an outbreak at a shelter in Tamaulipas was linked to a migrant whom the US had deported. Dozens of migrants tested positive for the virus after being deported to Guatemala.

=== May ===
On May 16, federal judges ordered the release of nearly 400 ICE detainees, "citing the preexisting medical conditions of the immigrants released and the potential for life-threatening complications from COVID-19." U.S. representatives Carolyn Maloney and Jamie Raskin noted that "despite our repeated attempts to secure information, ICE has failed to fully respond to our requests, casting serious doubt on its preparedness for this crisis." ICE reportedly released an additional 900 people detained in US immigration detention facilities. 1,201 people in US immigration detention had tested positive for COVID-19 out of 2,394 who have been tested at this time.

On May 19, the Department of Homeland Security's inspector general launched an investigation into ICE's handling of the coronavirus pandemic.

On May 21, a complaint was filed at Adelanto Detention Center after "a slew of interviews with inmates describing the poor conditions in the facility." Several accounts reported that guards were "spraying HDQ Neutral every 15 to 20 minutes all over communal areas with devastating consequences on those imprisoned." Manufacturer of the toxic chemical Spartan Chemical warns that HDQ Neutral "can cause skin burns and serious eye damage when inhaled." The chemical was sprayed by GEO Group Inc., who manages the facility under ICE contract, in un-ventilated areas every 15–20 minutes. One detainee stated: "When I blow my nose, blood comes out. They are treating us like animals. One person fainted and was taken out, I don't know what happened to them. There is no fresh air." Since May 11, at least nine inmates had fallen seriously ill because of the spraying. There was widespread outrage by activists, such as the media advocacy strategist at Freedom for Immigrants, who stated, "to us, this is an apparent act of retaliation for publicly reporting that GEO staff was previously only cleaning with water."

On May 22, the Bluebonnet Detention Center in rural West Texas, just five months after opening following the establishment of a lucrative agreement between local officials and ICE, became the site of one of the biggest outbreaks among immigration detention facilities in the country. The facility, run by a for-profit prison contractor, had approximately 111 confirmed cases, more than a quarter of the total population, which was the second-highest among immigration detention facilities at the time. The larger Otay Mesa Detention Center had the highest number of cases, with 155 as of May 22. Legal fellow at the Texas Civil Rights Project Carrie O'Connor commented: "What we're seeing is the number of detainees testing positive in Texas and across the country is exploding. The government is slow-walking their response. That slow walk is illegal and it's putting everybody at risk."

As of May 30, only 3,113 people in ICE detention had been tested–about ten percent of the total population. More than 1 in 5 immigrants, or 78 of the 379 immigrants held at the Houston Contract Detention Facility, had tested positive and the rate of infection had nearly tripled in the facility, up from 21 people the previous week.

=== June ===
On June 1, more than 1,406 immigration detainees had tested positive for the coronavirus, according to ICE. It was reported that the number of cases was "much higher given the relatively low number that ICE has reported testing – fewer than 12 percent of detainees."

On June 3, three detained people provided live, first-hand details of their time in a South Florida immigration detainment facility to U.S. District Court Judge Marcia G. Cooke virtually, while in the presence of an unmasked guard. One of the individuals was Deivys Perez Valladares, a diabetic 25-year-old Cuban national, who revealed that "the ICE official who is here with me, he doesn't have a mask on." When asked, Valladares revealed that the official was standing less than six feet away from him: "Much less. We're super close, like two or three feet." Valladares also "recounted to the court how he was transferred to and from three different detention centers within a week, and in one instance placed in a cramped 'hielera'—Spanish for icebox—for 13 hours with 17 other detainees." Icebox is a nickname detainees assign to "the frigid, cramped holding cells they are placed in prior to a transfer." ICE did not refute Valladares' claims. Steve Cooper, a Jamaican national, and Alejandro Ferrera Borges, a Cuban national, also testified. The Colorado Department of Public Health and Environment formally listed that an outbreak had occurred at a north Aurora immigration detention center managed by GEO Group Inc.

On June 4, The Human Rights Watch called for the United States to suspend deportations immediately in order to cease contributing to the spread of COVID-19 globally. Nicole Austin-Hillery, US program director at Human Rights Watch, stated: "Despite outbreaks of Covid-19 in US immigration detention centers and government travel restrictions the world over, the US has continued deportations with little regard for the consequences. With these reckless deportations, the Trump administration is contributing to the spread of Covid-19 and endangering public health globally."

The same day, it was announced that new detainees booked into one of twenty-two immigration detention facilities managed by ICE's in-house medical provider Health Services Corps. would begin being tested for coronavirus, after a reported surge in cases. However, despite the spread of COVID-19 in US immigration detention facilities, the 200 other facilities operated by third-party contractors have not begun testing detainees at intake. An influx of COVID-19 cases were reported At the Otero County Processing Center, with 92 total. An interview was denied by ICE. The nearby Otero County Prison Facility, a non-ICE facility, also reported a surge in cases and one death. The first confirmed case at Imperial Regional Detention Center in Calexico, a 22-year-old Bangladeshi national, was reported.

People detained in the Mesa Verde ICE Processing Center in Bakersfield, California held a hunger strike in protest of the murder of George Floyd, the shootings of Breonna Taylor, Oscar Grant, and Tony McDade, and the deaths of "Carlos Mejia, who died in ICE custody at Otay Mesa, and Choung Woong Ahn, our friend who died in ICE custody at this detention center," and the harmful conditions presented by the COVID-19 pandemic in US immigration detention.

By mid-June, cases were reportedly unable to be contained at the Eloy Detention Center in Arizona, as cases soared in the state. Marisol Mendoza, a diabetic immigrant in ICE custody at the Eloy Detention Center sued ICE and CoreCivic for her release. Mendoza was denied and instead a federal judge ordered ICE to improve her conditions and make them constitutional. This was not followed by ICE and within two weeks Mendoza tested positive for COVID-19.
