= Newton County Correctional Center =

Former prison in Texas, United States

Coordinates: 30.8656°N 93.7340°W

- Interactive map of Newton County Correctional Center
- Location: Newton, Texas
- Status: closed
- Opened: 1995
- Closed: 2012
- Managed by: Bobby Ross Group (1995-May 1998); Correctional Services Corporation (1998-2005); GEO Group (2005-Nov 2009); Community Education Centers (2009-March 2012)

The Newton County Correctional Center (originally Fillyaw Correctional Center) was a privately operated prison located in Newton, Newton County, Texas, owned by the county. From 1995 until its permanent closure in 2012, the county contracted with the Bobby Ross Group, Correctional Services Corporation, the GEO Group, and other prison operation companies.

In its history it housed inmates for a list of state corrections departments (Virginia, Oklahoma, Missouri, Montana, Hawaii, Arizona, Idaho), for the U.S. Immigration and Customs Enforcement, and other agencies.

== History ==
In 1995 the facility was operated by the Bobby Ross Group, and housed 150 male inmates from the Virginia Department of Corrections.

From December 1995, about half of the facility's 832 beds were occupied by inmates exported from Hawaii. NCCC housed 435 Hawaiians, 211 Virginians, 134 Oklahomans, one Montanan and five prisoners from the county as of December 1997.

A string of fires, riots, escapes, conflicts and legal action throughout 1996 and 1997 caused the Texas Commission on Jail Standards to step in and enforce state standards at the institution in February 1998. That March Oklahoma pulled out its 134 inmates. In May the Bobby Ross Group was fired and replaced by Correctional Services Corporation. The Hawaii prisoners stayed.

In April through June 2006, after the movement of about 250 Idaho Department of Correction prisoners into the facility, it experienced allegations of inmate abuse, an escape and the resignation of a deputy warden The Idaho prisoners were removed in July.

Newton County terminated the contract with GEO Group as of November 9, 2009. Operations continued under Community Education Centers until the last inmates departed in November 2011, and the unit closed permanently in March 2012.
