= Death of Carlos Ernesto Escobar Mejía =

Death of a detained Salvador immigrant

Carlos Ernesto Escobar Mejía was a 57-year-old man from El Salvador who had immigrated to the United States in 1980 and lived in Los Angeles for over 20 years. He had left the country after the Salvadoran Civil War, a US-backed military conflict, broke out. In an article on Escobar Mejía's death, Graig Graziosi of The Independent reported on the tragic web of violence that surrounded his life, after "US-backed death squads terrorized civilians and were accused of raping and murdering American missionaries" while using "scorched earth" tactics contributed to the scattering of civilian populations. Carlos and his sister Rosa Escobedo Mejía fled to the US to live with their older sister Maribel. His status in the US was undocumented. On May 6, 2020, he was reportedly the first immigrant to die from COVID-19 in the custody of U.S. Immigration and Customs Enforcement (ICE) and the 11th immigrant to die in government custody in the fiscal year. He died at the Paradise Valley Hospital in National City.

== Detention ==
In January 2020, Escobar Mejía was detained by ICE during an arrest of someone who he had been in a car with. ICE stated he was subject to pending removal proceedings. He was then taken to the Otay Mesa prison run by ICE and CoreCivic, a private prison corporation that operates the facility. People who had been detained in the facility had "complained about a lack of masks, cleaning supplies, and gloves to guard against the coronavirus" as well as being "confined to close quarters and unable to distance themselves from other detainees or guards who moved throughout the jail." A group of women at the immigration jail who had demanded masks "were threatened with pepper spray." Escobar Mejía spent days vomiting, complained of being in pain, and even stopped eating entirely at a point as part of a hunger strike in protest of the facility's inhumane conditions. Fellow detainee Erik Mercado who knew Escobar Mejía stated, "It was all about his sister. He wanted to get home and help her out." Mercado's sisters stated he was a "one-of-a-kind person" and lamented his loss while asking "why is there so much injustice in this world?"

Despite the rising concerns over the coronavirus pandemic in the United States, Escobar Mejía was denied bond on April 15 by immigration judge Lee O'Connor. He had been living with hypertension, diabetes, and had undergone multiple surgeries, including an operation which had resulted in the loss of his right foot, before being detained. He was reported as "still well" at the time of being denied bond. His former lawyer Joan Del Valle stated, "On April 15, he had the opportunity to have many more years of life. On April 15, when they denied him every possibility to be released in the middle of a pandemic, knowing how frail he was, they sentenced him to die." Escobar Mejía had health conditions that were known, yet was still denied release. Anne Rios, supervising attorney at Al Otro Lodo, a group working to release detainees from the Otay Mesa prison, emphasized "this was 100% avoidable. Immigration detention is civil detention — it is discretionary. ICE could've determined that this person who had underlying conditions could and should've been released. They had the discretion to do so and yet they chose not to."

== Death ==
On April 24, he was taken to the Paradise Valley Hospital in National City after showing symptoms of the virus and tested positive. He was taken to the hospital's intensive care unit and placed on a ventilator three days later. He reportedly died from acute respiratory failure due to pneumonia resulting from COVID-19 on May 6. On the day of his death, at least 132 ICE detainees at the Otay Mesa prison had tested positive for coronavirus, the most of any detention center used by the agency. At least 705 immigrants in ICE custody have tested positive for the coronavirus total. More than 48% of the 1,460 people who have been screened for the virus tested positive.

== Reactions ==
Advocacy groups including Pueblo Sin Fronteras and Otay Mesa Detention Resistance decried the conditions leading to Escobar Mejía's death sent a letter to politicians.

Senator Kamala Harris stated that Escobar Mejía's death was "likely preventable and there needs to be an investigation, and accountability for any wrongdoing."

Representative Juan Vargas stated that there was no way ICE was adhering to proper social distancing measures.

Senator Dianne Feinstein called for a federal investigation into the conditions at Otay Mesa.

Jesse Melgar, a press secretary for California Governor Gavin Newsom, commented that a thorough investigation into Escobar Mejía's death should take place. He also stated that it's necessary for public health officials need to protect people in federal custody.

On May 14, 2020, U.S. Representatives Carolyn Maloney and Jamie Raskin wrote a letter addressing ICE and the United States Department of Homeland Security criticizing their actions and requesting a briefing and documents regarding the death.

In June 2020, people detained in the Mesa Verde ICE Processing Center in Bakersfield, California held a hunger strike in protest of the murder of George Floyd, the police shootings of Breonna Taylor, Oscar Grant, and Tony McDade, and the deaths of "Carlos Mejia, who died in ICE custody at Otay Mesa, and Choung Woong Ahn, our friend who died in ICE custody at this detention center", and the harmful conditions presented by the COVID-19 pandemic in US immigration detention.

== See also ==
- Deaths of Jakelin Caal and Felipe Gómez Alonzo
