= Moore Haven Correctional Facility =

Prison in Florida, United States

Coordinates: 26°50′18″N 81°07′13″W

- Interactive map of Moore Haven Correctional Facility
- Location: 1282 FL-78, Moore Haven Moore Haven, Florida
- Status: mixed
- Capacity: 985
- Opened: 1995
- Managed by: GEO Group

The Moore Haven Correctional Facility is a private state prison for men located in Moore Haven, Glades County, Florida, which is operated by GEO Group under contract with the Florida Department of Corrections. This facility was opened in 1995 and has a maximum capacity of 985 prisoners.

== See also ==
- Glades County Detention Center
