= Ector County Correctional Center =

Prison in Odessa, Texas, United States

Coordinates: 31°50′50″N 102°21′58″W

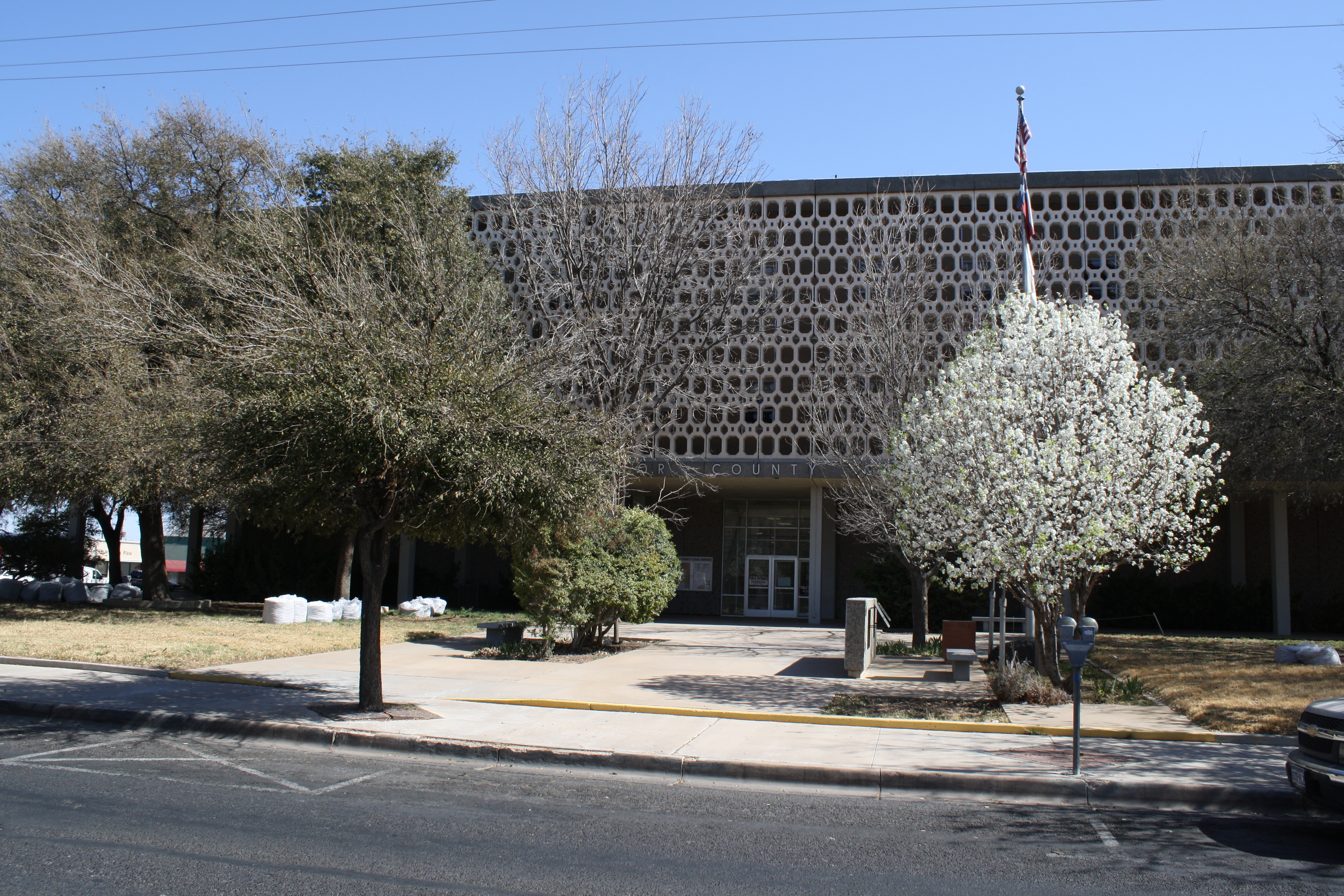
- Interactive map of Ector County Correctional Center
- Location: 301 N Texas Street Odessa, Texas
- Security class: Minimum / medium security
- Capacity: 235
- Managed by: The GEO Group

Ector County Correctional Center is a privately managed prison located in Odessa, Texas. It is housed on the second and third floors of the 1955 Ector County Courthouse at 301 N. Texas Street in Odessa.

The center was previously operated by Community Education Centers, one of seven CEC-managed facilities in Texas, under contract with three federal agencies: the United States Marshals Service, U.S. Immigration and Customs Enforcement and the Federal Bureau of Prisons. Following an acquisition, the center is now run by The GEO Warden Bryan LambertGroup. Its capacity is 235 adult males and females.

In mid-2013, eight of the jailers employed there received federal prison sentences for providing contraband items to inmates in exchange for bribes.
