= Glades County Detention Center =

Detention center in Florida, US

Coordinates: 26°50′19″N 81°7′26″W

The Glades County Detention Center, at 1297 East State Road 78 in remote Moore Haven, Florida, United States, opened in 2007 with 440 beds. Operated by the Glades County Sheriff's Office, besides Glades County arrestees, 90% of its beds house Immigration and Customs Enforcement detainees, which were previously spread around many county jails. It is Glades County's largest employer. It has been the site of widespread abuses, and in 2022, 17 members of Congress asked that it be closed.

== 2018–2020 complaints ==
In 2018, Muslims complained of not being able to observe Ramadan, with Christians, according to them, receiving preferential treatment.

In 2019, a group of Muslim inmates filed suit alleging they were denied "adequate prayer services, copies of the Quran, religious headwear, and religiously compliant diets. When asked by one detained immigrant why Muslims were treated so disfavorably, the chaplain replied, 'Boy, you’re in Glades County.'"

In April 2020, the Southern Poverty Law Center, the Immigration Clinic at the University of Miami School of Law, and other plaintiffs sued the Immigration and Customs Enforcement Agency and the U.S. Attorney General. They sought the release of inmates at Glades and its other south Florida centers, Krome Processing Center in Miami-Dade and the Broward Transitional Center in Pompano Beach, claiming that ICE was not following CDC guidelines to minimize COVID-19 transmission. (Other Florida counties whose detention centers have contracts to house ICE detainees are Baker, Collier, Monroe, Pinellas, and Wakulla.)

== 2021 complaints ==
In February 2021, a civil rights complaint, described as "scathing" in a newspaper, was filed by three immigrants' rights organizations with the Inspector General and the Office for Civil Rights and Civil Liberties in the Department of Homeland Security. Although the Glades County center "has ranked among the nation’s most COVID-riddled detention centers." According to the complaint, masks and COVID-19 tests are not available, temperatures are only taken irregularly, and the center's one doctor had COVID-19 and did not wear a mask. Detainees reporting abuses are punished. A civil rights complaint was filed March 4 with the Office of Civil Rights and Civil Liberties under the Department of Homeland Security concerning what were described as retaliatory actions against two of the plaintiffs in the February complaint.

In June 2021, according to Doctors for Camp Closure, "The people held at this immigration detention center report not having access to medical attention, negligence, inadequate physical distancing or masks."

In August 2021, according to Scientific American, the Glades County facility was not diluting chemicals used for disinfection and COVID-19 prevention according to the manufacturer's directions.

In September 2021, about 100 detainees, as did detainees at other facilities, participated in a hunger strike. According to inmates who had already been in federal prisons, conditions at Glades were worse.

In October 2021, the Inspector General of the Department of Homeland Security, after an audit, reported that the "U.S. Immigration and Customs Enforcement (ICE) did not always comply with segregation reporting requirements [COVID-19 segregation] and did not ensure detention facilities complied with records retention requirements." According to the report, Congress—where the House of Representatives held a hearing on September 26, 2019—"and the public have expressed concerns regarding prolonged or excessive use of segregation at ICE detention facilities. From FY 2015 through FY 2019, the DHS OIG Hotline received 1,200 allegations related to concerns about segregation."

In November 2021 a coalition of groups wrote the U.S. Immigration and Customs Enforcement (ICE) requesting that it cancel its contract with Glades County for the Glades County Detention Center (“Glades”) because of what it called a "systemic and consistent pattern of racism and anti-Blackness towards Black immigrants." The groups were the American Civil Liberties Union of Florida, Americans for Immigrant Justice, Borderless Existence Initiative, Detention Watch Network, Doctors for Camp Closure, Envision Freedom Fund, Freedom for Immigrants, Immigrant Action Alliance, Southern Poverty Law Center, University of Miami School of Law Immigration Clinic, United We Dream, and Qlatinx. The 157-page document contains numerous sworn statements about misconduct experienced or witnessed.

== 2022 complaints ==
In January 2022, the American Civil Liberties Union of Florida wrote Acting ICE Director Tae D. Johnson and David S. Ferriero, Archivist of the United States (head of the National Archives), calling for an end to systematic, and in their judgment illegal, erasure of surveillance video at the Glades County facility, in violation of federal recordkeeping law and contractual requjrements.

On February 1, 2022, Debbie Wasserman Schultz and 16 other members of Congress sent a joint letter to Alejandro Mayorkas, Secretary of the Department of Homeland Security, pointing out that reports of abuses had increased since their complaint in the summer of 2021, and asking that it be closed. According to their complaint, "immigrants have been subject to racist abuse, often resulting in verbal abuse and violence; sexual abuse, including sexual voyeurism by guards who have watched women shower; life-endangering COVID-19 and medical neglect, including a near-fatal carbon monoxide leak last November; and regular exposure to highly dangerous levels of a toxic disinfectant chemical spray linked to severe medical harms and long-term damage to reproductive health."

== See also ==
- Broward Transitional Center
- Moore Haven Correctional Facility
