= Otay Mesa Detention Center =

Prison in California, United States

- Interactive map of Otay Mesa Detention Center
- Location: Otay Mesa, San Diego, California; 32°35′31″N 116°55′21″W
- Security class: Minimum/medium
- Capacity: 1040
- Managed by: CoreCivic
- Director: Fred Lawrence

Otay Mesa Detention Center is a minimum/medium security federal prison for women, managed by CoreCivic under contract with the United States Marshals Service and U.S. Immigration and Customs Enforcement (ICE). The facility is situated in the San Ysidro Mountains foothills of Otay Mesa overlooking the U.S.-Mexico border. CoreCivic sold the facility to the U.S. Department of Homeland Security in 2026.

The Otay Mesa site is shared with other law enforcement–related properties:

- Richard J. Donovan Correctional Facility, operated by the California Department of Corrections and Rehabilitation.
- George Bailey Detention Facility (San Diego County)
- East Mesa Reentry Facility (San Diego County)
- Facility 8 Detention Facility (San Diego County)
- East Mesa Juvenile Detention Facility (San Diego County)
- A multi-jurisdictional law enforcement firearms training complex used by the FBI, the Customs Service, and local police forces

== In popular culture ==
In the 2025 film One Battle After Another, a far-left revolutionary group breaks immigrants out of the center. The scene was filmed at the center itself, and to do so, the filmmakers received approval from the city of Otay Mesa, the San Diego County government, U.S. Border Patrol, the Department of Homeland Security, California Highway Patrol, and Caltrans.
