= Theo Lacy Facility =

Correctional facility in Orange County, California

- Location within the Los Angeles metropolitan area Location within California Location within the United States Location within North America
- Location: 501 The City Drive South, Orange, California, United States; 33.782434°N 117.887982°W
- Status: Operational
- Security class: Maximum security
- Capacity: 3,442
- Opened: 1960
- Managed by: Orange County Sheriff's Department
- Website: Theo Lacy Facility

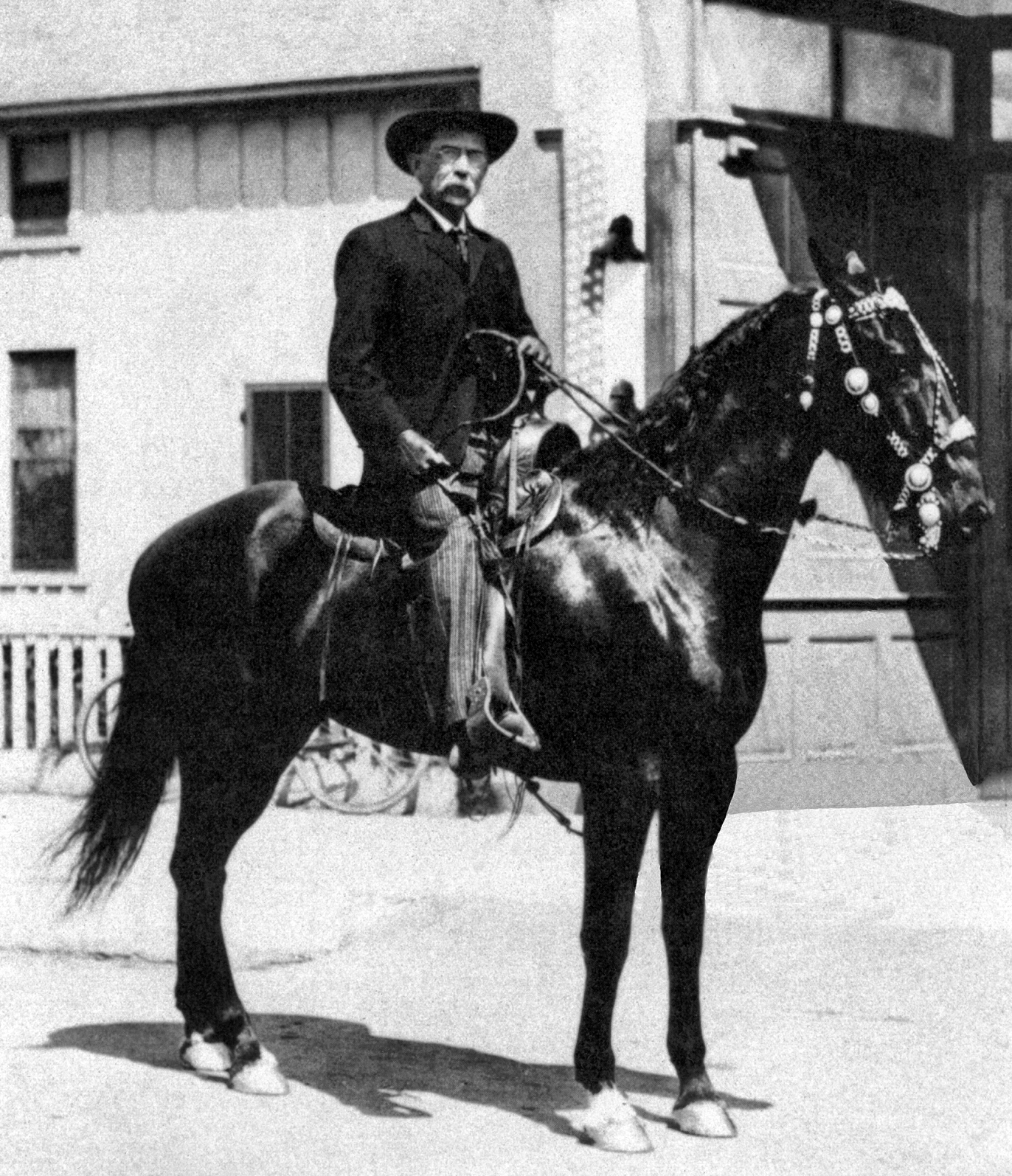
Orange County Sheriff Theo Lacy on horseback, 1890s

The Theo Lacy Facility is a county corrections facility in Orange, California, operated by the Orange County Sheriff's Department.

== Overview ==
The Theo Lacy Facility is a maximum-security jail which houses individuals awaiting trial and inmates serving misdemeanor and felony sentences of less than three years. The jail opened in 1960 and was named for Theo Lacy, a former sheriff of Orange County. It has a maximum capacity of 3,442 inmates and is the county's largest jail.

Plans to expand Theo Lacy drew community opposition and disputes between the sheriff's office and the city of Orange over inmate classification, security, and the release of inmates into the surrounding community.

Grand jury reports and news coverage have raised concerns about conditions for inmates and about safety for inmates, visitors, and staff. In July 2020, inmates at Theo Lacy and the Central Jail complex began a hunger strike over the suspension of in-person visits and hot meals during the COVID-19 pandemic. In 2023, a visitor was inadvertently locked inside a visiting area overnight.

The jail also held immigration detainees for U.S. Immigration and Customs Enforcement (ICE) until the sheriff's department stopped housing them in August 2019.

== See also ==
- James A. Musick Facility
- List of California county jails
