= Bergen County Jail =

County jail in New Jersey, United States

Coordinates: 40.873417°N 74.039995°W

Bergen County Jail is a facility operated by the Bergen County Sheriff's Office located at 160 South River Street in Hackensack, New Jersey. The jail provides a detention for both sentenced and unsentenced prisoners from minimum to maximum security environment. There are computer controls of inmate housing areas, in addition to alarm system and a computerized center control.

The jail also houses detainees of the U.S. Immigration and Customs Enforcement.
