= Phelps County Jail =

- U.S. National Register of Historic Places
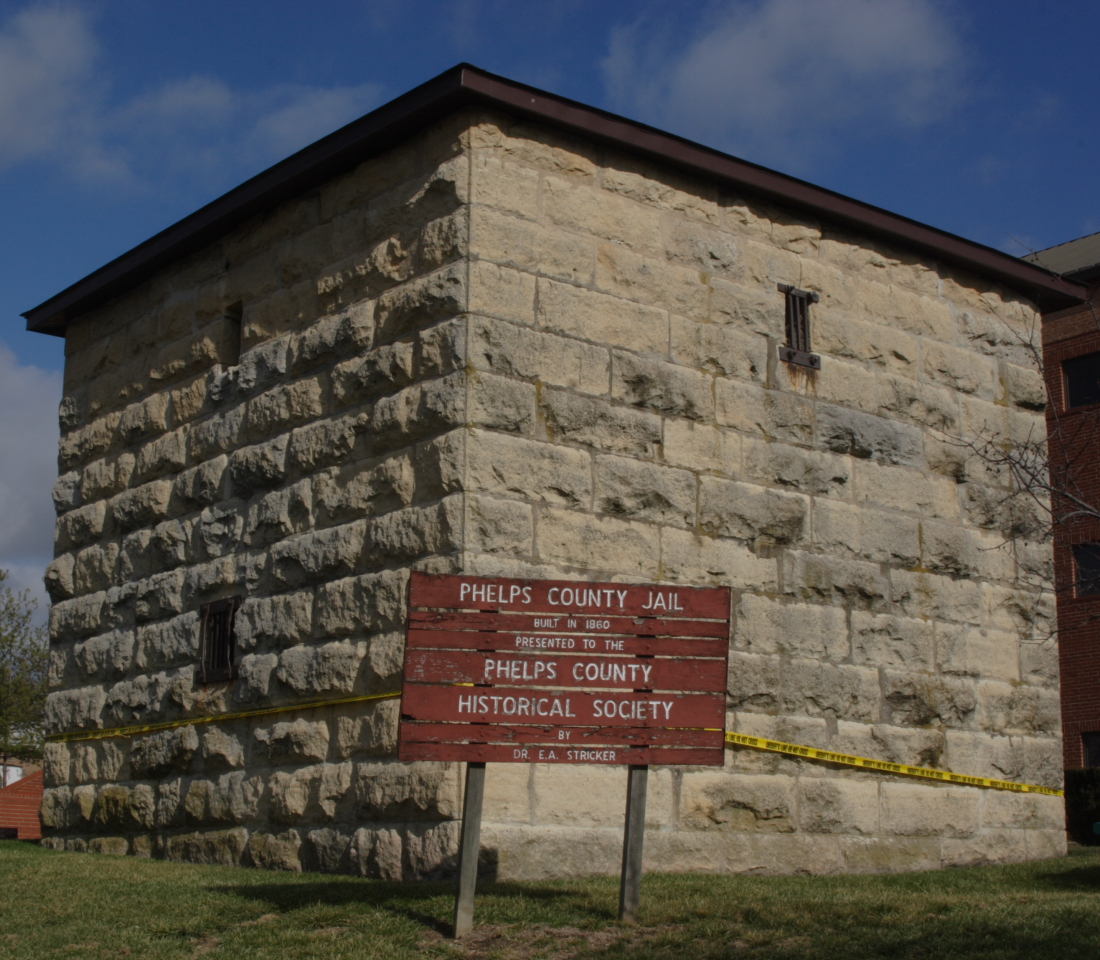
- Phelps County Jail

- Location within Missouri Location within the United States
- Location: Park St. between Second and Third Sts., Rolla, Missouri
- Coordinates: 37°56′45.05″N 91°46′27.15″W
- Area: less than one acre
- Built: 1860
- Built by: Wilson, James; Schnable, I.A.
- NRHP reference No.: 90000766
- Added to NRHP: May 10, 1990

Phelps County Jail is a historic jail located on Park Street between Second and Third Streets, Rolla, Missouri, was built in 1860 for $3,000. The jail was operated by Phelps County from 1860 to 1912. Union forces, which took over the town in 1861, used the jail for both military and civilian prisoners during the American Civil War. The building's contractor, John A. Schnable, built the structure from solid dolomite blocks, measuring 22 by 22 inches (560 mm × 560 mm), which were quarried nearby. The lower floor contains two windowless 6-by-13-foot (1.8 m × 4.0 m) stone cells for solitary confinement. The upper floor contains a single room with cages made from iron bars to hold multiple prisoners. The upper floor also includes a wood-burning stove used for heating. Dr. E.A. Stricker presented the jail to the Phelps County Historical Society in 1943.

It was added to the National Register of Historic Places in 1990.
