= Community Education Centers =

U.S. private prison operator, subsidiary of GEO Group

Community Education Centers, Inc. (CEC) was a private corrections company based in West Caldwell, New Jersey that operated residential reentry facilities, jails, and in-prison drug treatment programs in seventeen American states and Bermuda.

In June 2007, CEC acquired the jail management company, CiviGenics.

In 2011, the state of New Jersey and its county governments spent $71 million of the $105 million budget allocated for halfway houses on contracts awarded to Community Education Centers.

The firm operated fourteen jails, mostly in Texas. Its largest “secure facility” was the George W. Hill Correctional Facility in Thornbury Township, Delaware County, Pennsylvania with a capacity of 1,883. It also had contracts for twenty six “residential reentry” facilities, more commonly called halfway homes. The largest of these was Delaney Hall in Newark, New Jersey with a capacity of 1,196. It also offered a number of residential treatment programs funded by Native American tribes in six states.

In addition to contracts with cities, counties, and states, CEC also had contracts with the Federal Bureau of Prisons to provide reentry services across four states.

In August 2012, officials from Mercer County, New Jersey found that 73% of randomly sampled inmates from the CEC-operated Albert M. “Bo” Robinson Assessment and Treatment Center tested positive for drugs. CEC did not fulfill its government contracts to provide therapy and job training to inmates. Critics argued that CEC continued to receive government contracts because its senior vice president was Bill Palatucci, a close friend of then-Governor of New Jersey Chris Christie.

Typical contracts involved CEC providing housing for $70/day per inmate, achieving roughly half the operating costs of government facilities by cutting corners on contract requirements. Minimal supervision allowed inmates to retain their connections to criminal organizations, such as Delaney Hall becoming controlled by the Bloods gang and its drug trade.

In April 2017, GEO Group, one of the world's largest for-profit prison corporations, acquired Community Education Centers.

== Misconduct ==
In December 2008, CEC Correctional Officer Odessan Andrew Allen Zehr was charged with accepting bribes to smuggle contraband into the company's Ector County Correctional Center.

In May 2009, CEC Correctional Officer Amber Hinds was indicted on charges of attempting to smuggle drugs into the Texarkana, Texas facility.

In September 2009, McLennan County, Texas Sheriff Larry Lynch said he would no longer accept payments from CEC to avoid a conflict-of-interest in his decisions of which private prisons to approve.

In March 2011, the Liberty County, Texas jail failed an inspection by the Texas Commission on Jail Standards. Violations included key administrators lacking state licenses, plumbing problems, and inoperative communications systems.

In October 2011, CEC Correctional Officer James Allen Roach pleaded guilty to charges of smuggling tobacco and marijuana to inmates at the Liberty County, Texas facility.

In January 2012, the Deputy Commissioner of the New Jersey Department of Corrections, Lydell B Sherrer, pleaded guilty to federal extortion charges for arranging jobs at the facilities in exchange for bribes.

In July 2012, the New Jersey State Legislature held two days of hearings on halfway houses in the state. Shortly after the hearings, the state imposed a fine of $45,000 on contractors including Community Education Centers for not promptly notifying state authorities of escaped inmates in six prior cases.

In 2013, The New York Times reported that the firm was the largest provider of halfway house services in Pennsylvania with almost 1,300 beds. A study by the Pennsylvania Department of Corrections identified higher rates of recidivism among inmates who went through halfway houses before release, as opposed to those released directly from jail.

In May 2013, CEC Correctional Officer Latondra Natrell Brown was arrested for smuggling contraband to inmates at the Liberty County, Texas facility.

In June 2013, nine Correctional Officers were federally convicted of smuggling contraband into the Ector County Correctional Center.

== See also ==
- Prison-industrial complex
- Drug rehabilitation
- Social Services
