= Atlanta City Detention Center =

Jail in Atlanta, Georgia, US

- Interactive map of Atlanta City Detention Center
- Location: Atlanta, Georgia; 33.7473°N 84.3954°W
- Status: Operational (partial use)
- Security class: Municipal pretrial detention and arrest-processing facility
- Capacity: 1,300 beds
- Population: approximately 400 (2025)
- Opened: 1995
- Managed by: Atlanta Department of Corrections

Atlanta City Detention Center (ACDC), also known as the Atlanta City Jail, is a municipal pretrial detention and arrest-processing facility located at 254 Peachtree Street SW in Atlanta, Georgia. Opened in 1995 as a design–build project by Turner Associates Architects and the Turner Construction Company, the 471,000-square-foot, 1,300-bed facility was built in anticipation of increased arrest activity surrounding the 1996 Summer Olympics.

Although designed to hold over a thousand people, ACDC's daily population declined sharply in the late 2010s following a series of criminal justice reforms enacted under Mayor Keisha Lance Bottoms, including the end of cash bail for most municipal offenses and the termination of the city's contract to hold detainees for U.S. Immigration and Customs Enforcement (ICE). In May 2019, following years of organizing by coalitions including Women on the Rise and the Close the Jail ATL: Communities Over Cages campaign, Bottoms signed legislation authorizing the closure of ACDC and establishing a task force to repurpose the building into a "Center for Equity." A 2021 analysis commissioned by the city from the Vera Institute of Justice found that, as of October 2020, ACDC held fewer than 25 people on an average day at an estimated cost of $807,723 per incarcerated person annually—more than seventeen times the national average—and that Black residents made up 90 percent of the facility's average daily population despite constituting roughly half of Atlanta's population.

Despite the 2019 closure commitment, ACDC was never fully decommissioned. In August 2022, amid a fatal overcrowding crisis at the Fulton County Jail, the Atlanta City Council approved Ordinance 22-O-1632, authorizing a four-year lease of up to 700 ACDC beds to Fulton County at a rate of $50 per detainee per day. The agreement, opposed by many of the activists who had campaigned for the jail's closure, has remained a point of contention between the city and county. In late 2024, the Fulton County Commission unsuccessfully sought state legislative intervention to compel Atlanta to sell the facility outright, and by early 2025 the Atlanta City Council was considering measures signaling it would not renew the lease when it expires in late 2026.

== Design and early history (1990s–2000s) ==
Construction on ACDC began in 1993 and concluded in 1995 as a design–build venture between Turner Associates Architects, with David Perkins, AIA, serving as lead architect, and the Turner Construction Company. The project, delivered for a total cost of $56 million, was completed under budget and ahead of schedule; one city official at the time reportedly described it as "the first Olympic project completed on time," a reference to the city's preparations for the 1996 Summer Olympics. The facility adopted a podular, or "direct supervision," design in which corrections officers are stationed within open dormitory-style housing units rather than patrolling rows of individual cells, an approach intended to allow fewer staff to supervise larger groups of detainees.

The detention center initially opened with approximately 882 finished beds, with additional unfinished "shell" space designed to eventually accommodate up to 1,100 beds. Continued build-out, including a 1999 renovation, expanded the facility to its now-standard capacity of approximately 1,300 beds.

ACDC primarily held people arrested for violations of city ordinances and traffic offenses, and the city separately maintained an agreement with the United States Marshals Service to house federal detainees, a relationship that helped offset construction debt. The jail's opening coincided with the run-up to the 1996 Olympic Games, during which Atlanta enacted a series of ordinances criminalizing public conduct such as loitering and panhandling. According to Atlanta Civic Circle, these ordinances led to the arrest of an estimated 9,000 low-income Atlantans in the eighteen months preceding the Games, many of whom were held at the newly opened detention center. In January 2003, the city transferred responsibility for detaining people charged with state-level offenses to the Fulton and DeKalb county jail systems, reducing the scope of ACDC's correctional role by roughly one-third.

== Decline and closure initiatives (2019–2021) ==
Beginning in the late 2010s, Atlanta enacted a series of pretrial justice reforms that sharply reduced ACDC's population. In February 2018, the city eliminated cash bond for most municipal ordinance violations. Later that year, Mayor Bottoms signed two executive orders—one in June halting the admission of new ICE detainees, and a second in September permanently ending the city's practice of housing ICE detainees altogether, resulting in the transfer of the facility's remaining ICE population out of ACDC.

These changes were driven in significant part by sustained community organizing. Women on the Rise, an organization led by formerly incarcerated organizer Marilynn Winn, launched the Close the Jail ATL: Communities Over Cages campaign in July 2018 in coalition with the Racial Justice Action Center, the Solutions Not Punishment Coalition, and roughly 48 allied organizations. The coalition argued that ACDC's operating budget, then estimated at over $30 million annually, could be more effectively redirected toward services such as housing, healthcare, and re-entry support.

In May 2019, Mayor Bottoms signed legislation authorizing the closure of ACDC and establishing the Reimagining ACDC Task Force, a body of city, county, and community stakeholders charged with developing a plan to convert the facility into a "Center for Equity." Winn, formerly incarcerated at the facility, called the legislation a step toward making Atlanta "a city that chooses services not sentences, solutions not punishments." The planning and design firm Designing Justice + Designing Spaces was later selected to assist in developing plans for the building's repurposing.

In September 2020, the city engaged the Vera Institute of Justice to develop a roadmap for ACDC's closure. In a February 2021 report, Vera found that as of October 2020 the facility's average daily population had fallen to just 23 people, down from 185 in February 2020 before the COVID-19 pandemic suspended municipal court operations. Based on the city's proposed FY2021 budget of $18.9 million for the Department of Corrections, Vera calculated an effective annual operating cost of $807,723 per incarcerated person—more than seventeen times the $47,057 national average it had identified in a 2015 survey of 35 jurisdictions. The report also found that Black residents constituted 90 percent of ACDC's average daily population in October 2020, despite making up approximately 52 percent of Atlanta's overall population, and that 88 percent of those held were awaiting trial rather than serving a sentence. Vera recommended five policy changes—including expanded use of citation-in-lieu-of-arrest and alternative crisis responders—that it argued could allow the city to close ACDC within three months without compromising public safety.

== Fulton County bed-leasing controversy (2022–present) ==
Despite the 2019 closure commitment, ACDC remained open, and by 2022 city officials faced renewed pressure to address a separate crisis: severe and, according to advocacy groups, fatal overcrowding at the Fulton County Jail on Rice Street. Fulton County Sheriff Patrick Labat and District Attorney Fani Willis publicly called for ACDC to be used to relieve the crisis, citing conditions in which detainees were reportedly sleeping on the floor of the county facility.

On August 15, 2022, the Atlanta City Council voted 10–4 to approve Ordinance 22-O-1632, authorizing Mayor Andre Dickens to enter into an intergovernmental agreement permitting Fulton County to house up to 700 detainees at ACDC for a term not to exceed four years, with no renewal option. Under the agreement, Fulton County pays the city $50 per detainee per day and is entitled to 65 percent of phone and commissary fees generated by the housed detainees; if the county failed to vacate the beds at the lease's conclusion, the per diem rate would rise to $150. A fiscal analysis prepared by the Legal Action Center estimated that the city spent at least $14 million annually to operate and maintain ACDC, and concluded that net revenue from the Fulton County lease was unlikely to exceed that cost in most projected scenarios.

The agreement drew opposition from many of the same activists who had campaigned for ACDC's closure. Representatives of the Southern Center for Human Rights and Community Over Cages ATL argued before the council that the lease represented an expansion of the area's carceral footprint and was inconsistent with the city's stated goal of converting ACDC into a Center for Diversion and Services. Supporters, including Councilmember Michael Julian Bond, who sponsored the legislation, characterized the lease as a necessary humanitarian response to dangerous conditions at the county jail.

By 2024, the Fulton County Jail remained the subject of scrutiny; a U.S. Department of Justice investigation released that November found that the facility had failed to protect detainees from harm, citing excessive use of force, inadequate medical and mental health care, and unsafe conditions. Separately, the Fulton County Commission voted to include acquisition of ACDC on its 2025 legislative agenda, seeking state assistance to compel Atlanta to sell the building outright. The American Civil Liberties Union of Georgia opposed the proposal, arguing that it would expand Fulton County's "carceral footprint" rather than address the underlying causes of jail overcrowding. In early 2025, Georgia state senator John Albers introduced SB 7, which sought to require Atlanta to continue leasing ACDC space to Fulton County at cost; the bill advanced out of a Senate committee but did not receive a vote before the legislature's 2025 crossover deadline.

In March 2025, the Atlanta City Council began advancing a resolution, introduced by council members Antonio Lewis, Jason Dozier, and Liliana Bakhtiari, that would initiate a staged withdrawal of Fulton County detainees from ACDC ahead of the lease's scheduled expiration. The resolution's sponsors cited the deaths of detainees in Fulton County custody, including at least two who died while housed at ACDC. The measure was held in committee rather than advanced to a full council vote, and as of mid-2026 the facility's long-term status remained undetermined, with the city–county lease scheduled to expire in late 2026. Sheriff Labat has continued to argue that withdrawing Fulton County detainees from ACDC without an alternative in place would worsen overcrowding and increase the risk of further deaths, while Fulton County officials have separately proposed constructing a new $1.1 billion "special purpose facility" as a long-term alternative to leasing space from the city. Mayor Dickens has stated that he does not intend to sell or permanently relinquish the building to the county.

== See also ==
- Fulton County Jail
- Vera Institute of Justice
- Keisha Lance Bottoms
- Andre Dickens
- Atlanta City Council
- Criminal justice reform in the United States
