= Monroe County Jail =

Monroe County Jail may refer to:

- Monroe County Jail (Clarendon, Arkansas), listed on the National Register of Historic Places in Monroe County, Arkansas
- Monroe County Jail (Athens, Mississippi), listed on the National Register of Historic Places in Monroe County, Mississippi
