= Clay County Jail =

- U.S. National Register of Historic Places
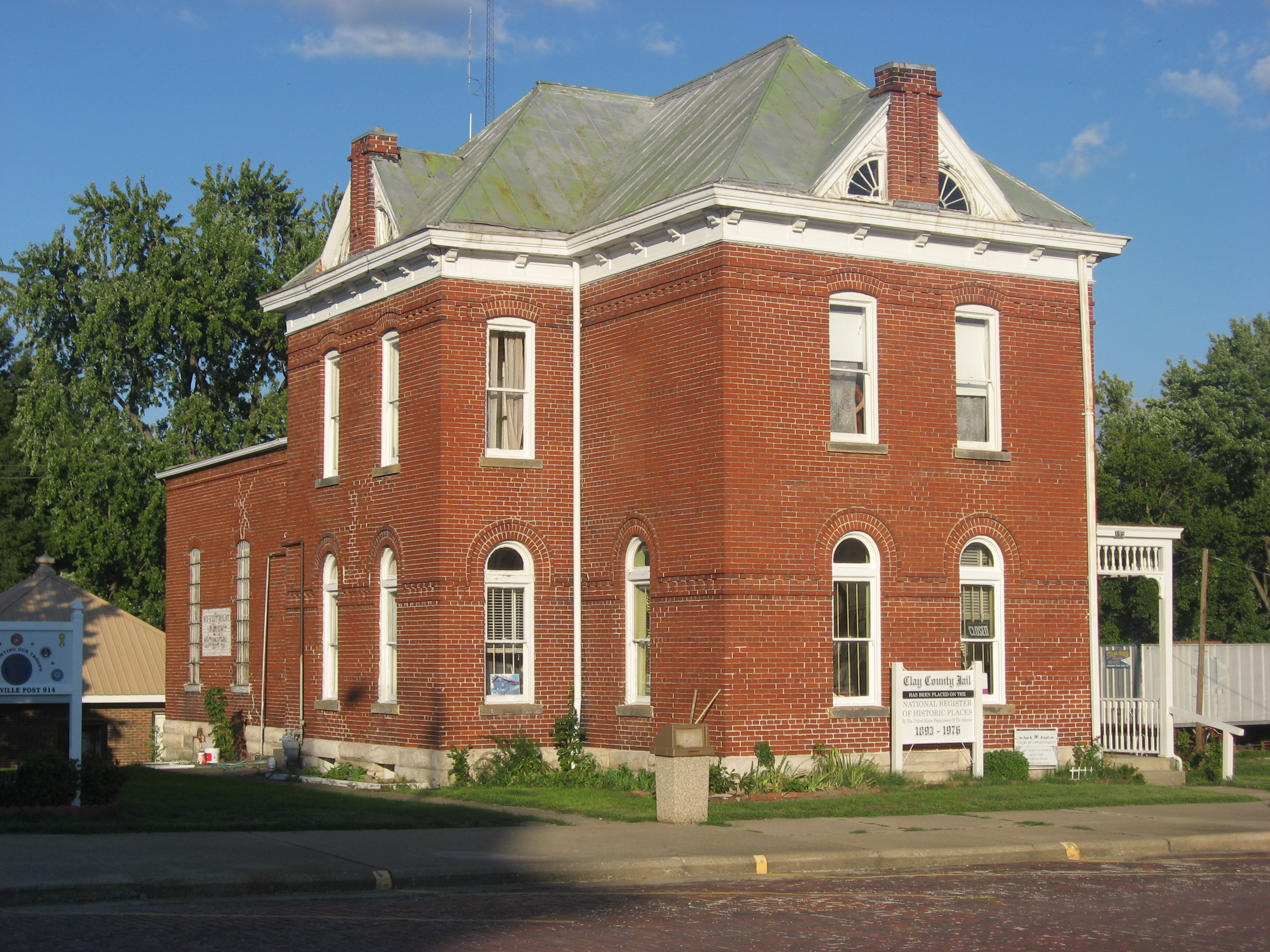

- Location within Illinois Location within the United States
- Location: 195 Main St., Louisville, Illinois
- Coordinates: 38°46′20″N 88°30′2″W
- Area: less than one acre
- Built: 1893
- Built by: Pailey Jail Building and Mfg. Co.
- Architectural style: Queen Anne
- NRHP reference No.: 98000986
- Added to NRHP: August 6, 1998

The Clay County Jail is a historic former jail located at 195 Main St. in Louisville, Illinois. Built in 1893, the jail was the third used by the county. The brick jail was designed in the Queen Anne style; its design features gabled dormers at the front of its hip roof and a spindlework front porch. The jail building also included the county sheriff's residence, a common arrangement which allowed the sheriff to oversee the prisoners at all times. The jail is now used as the Clay County Historical Society Museum.

The jail was added to the National Register of Historic Places on August 6, 1998.
