= Texas Commission on Jail Standards =

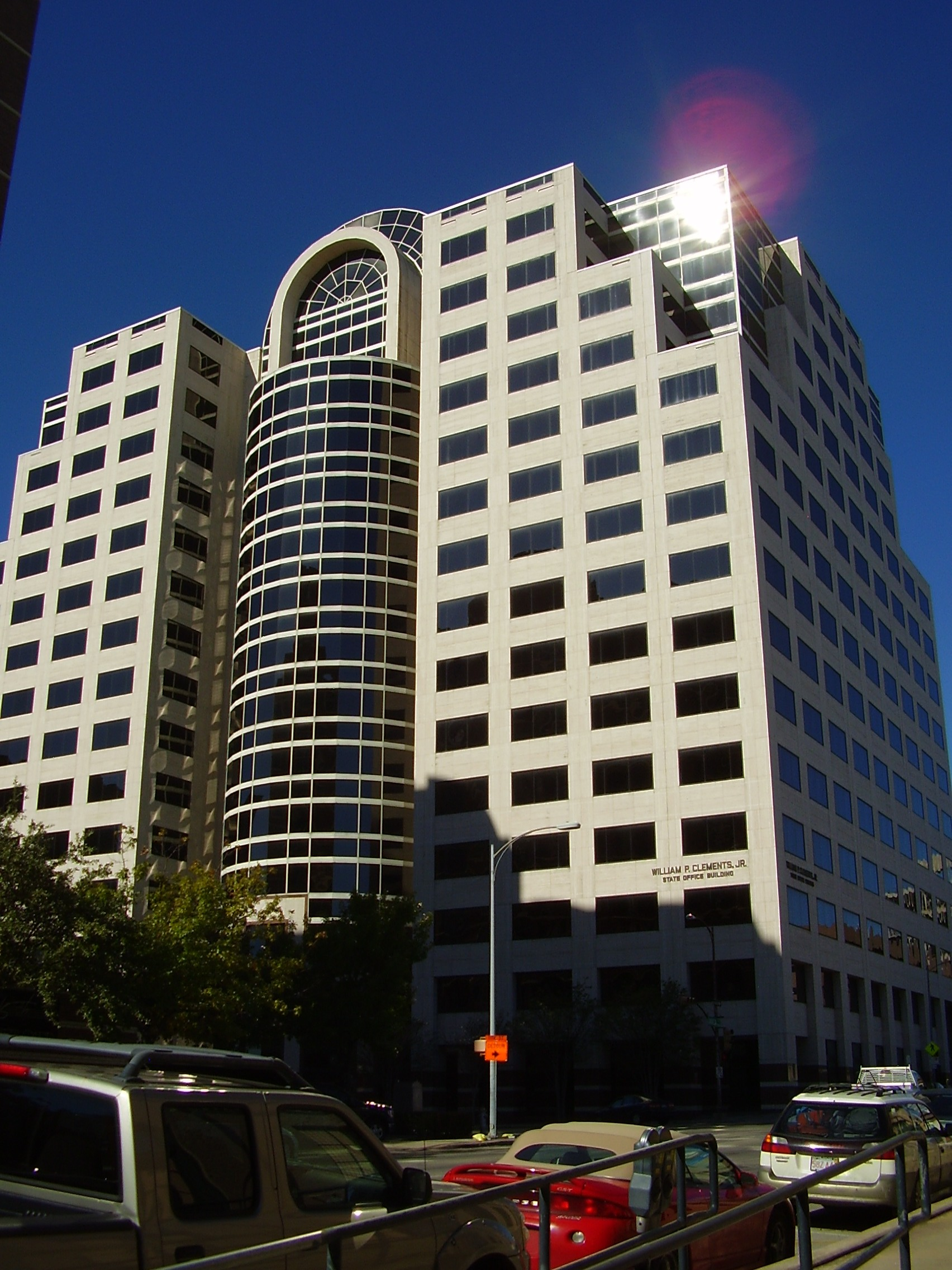
The William P. Clements State Office Building houses the offices of the Texas Commission on Jail Standards

The Texas Commission on Jail Standards (TCJS) is an agency of the Government of Texas.

Headquartered in the William Clements State Office Building in Downtown Austin, the agency oversees county jails to ensure standards of construction and operation. The agency was created in 1975.
