= James A. Musick Facility =

Correctional center in Orange County, California

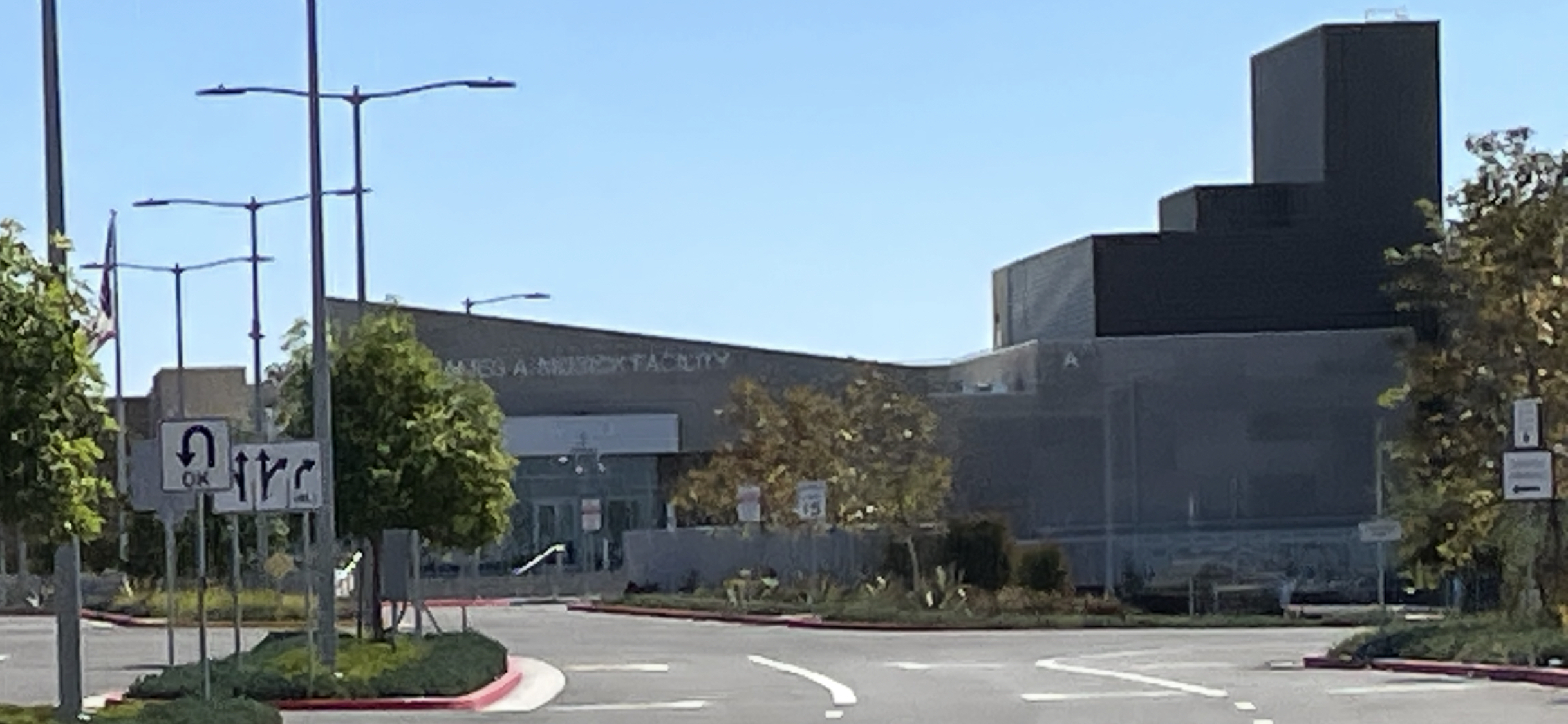

- Location within California
- Location: 13502 Musick Irvine, California, United States; 33°39′50″N 117°42′01″W
- Status: Temporarily closed (construction)
- Security class: Minimum-security
- Capacity: 1,250
- Opened: 1963; 63 years ago
- Managed by: Orange County Sheriff's Department

James A. Musick Facility is a minimum-security county jail in south Orange County, California. The county jail is located on an unincorporated pocket of land surrounded by the city of Irvine on three sides (including Alton Parkway to the northwest) and bordered by Lake Forest's Bake Parkway to the southeast. Despite being on unincorporated land, the jail is listed as being in Irvine. The 1,250-bed facility houses inmates charged with lower-level offenses such as intoxicated driving and drug possession. The jail is named in honor of James A. Musick, the sheriff of Orange County from 1946 to 1974. A small portion of the center's resources are dedicated to illegal immigration detainees, however, that usage was discontinued in July 2019.

== History ==
The James A. Musick Facility opened in 1963 in a largely undeveloped area, miles from any incorporated city. In the early days, inmates would spend time farming fruits, vegetables, and livestock. Security for the prison was very low, and fences were allegedly only erected to keep neighboring cattle out of the produce. A former employee of the jail testified that the inmates were trusted enough to "walk around on their own", and that the farming encouraged good behavior. The jail has been nicknamed "The Farm" due to its early agricultural operations.

After decades of planning to expand the facility, construction of new buildings and infrastructure began in 2019 and is expected to be complete by 2022. Officials estimate that the project will cost $167 million to complete. The jail is currently vacant of inmates due to the construction process. Upon completion, the James A. Musick Facility will have the capacity for 896 more inmates. Many have criticized the decision to expand the jail, alleging that the project will lead to increased racism and mass incarceration of racial minorities, and that the expansion is not needed as the county has a low incarceration rate.

In 2021, criticism arose surrounding the Orange County Board of Supervisors and its decision to approve the jail's expansion during the COVID-19 pandemic without hearing public comments on the matter. An activist group called Stop the Musick Coalition and the City of Irvine have both expressed displeasure with the board's conduct. The coalition asked the city to pass a new resolution directly opposing the expansion of the facility. The City of Irvine previously voted against an expansion proposed by the Orange County Sheriff's Department in 2008. On May 4, 2021, the city passed a resolution requesting that the county board of supervisors hold a town hall on the matter to hear the public's opinion. The board did not honor the city's request.

== See also ==
- Theo Lacy Facility
