= Broward Transitional Center =

For-profit detention center in Florida

Coordinates: 26.2772°N 80.1509°W

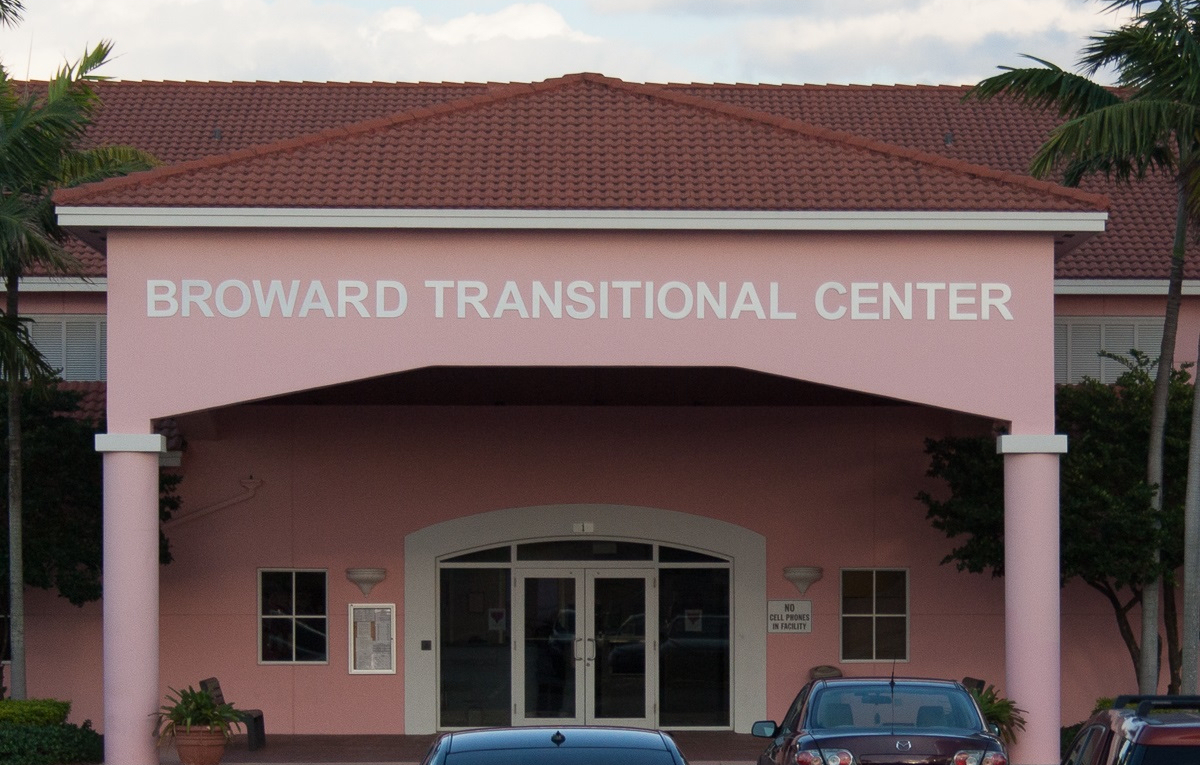
The main entrance to the Broward Transitional Center in Pompano Beach, Florida, from Powerline Road.

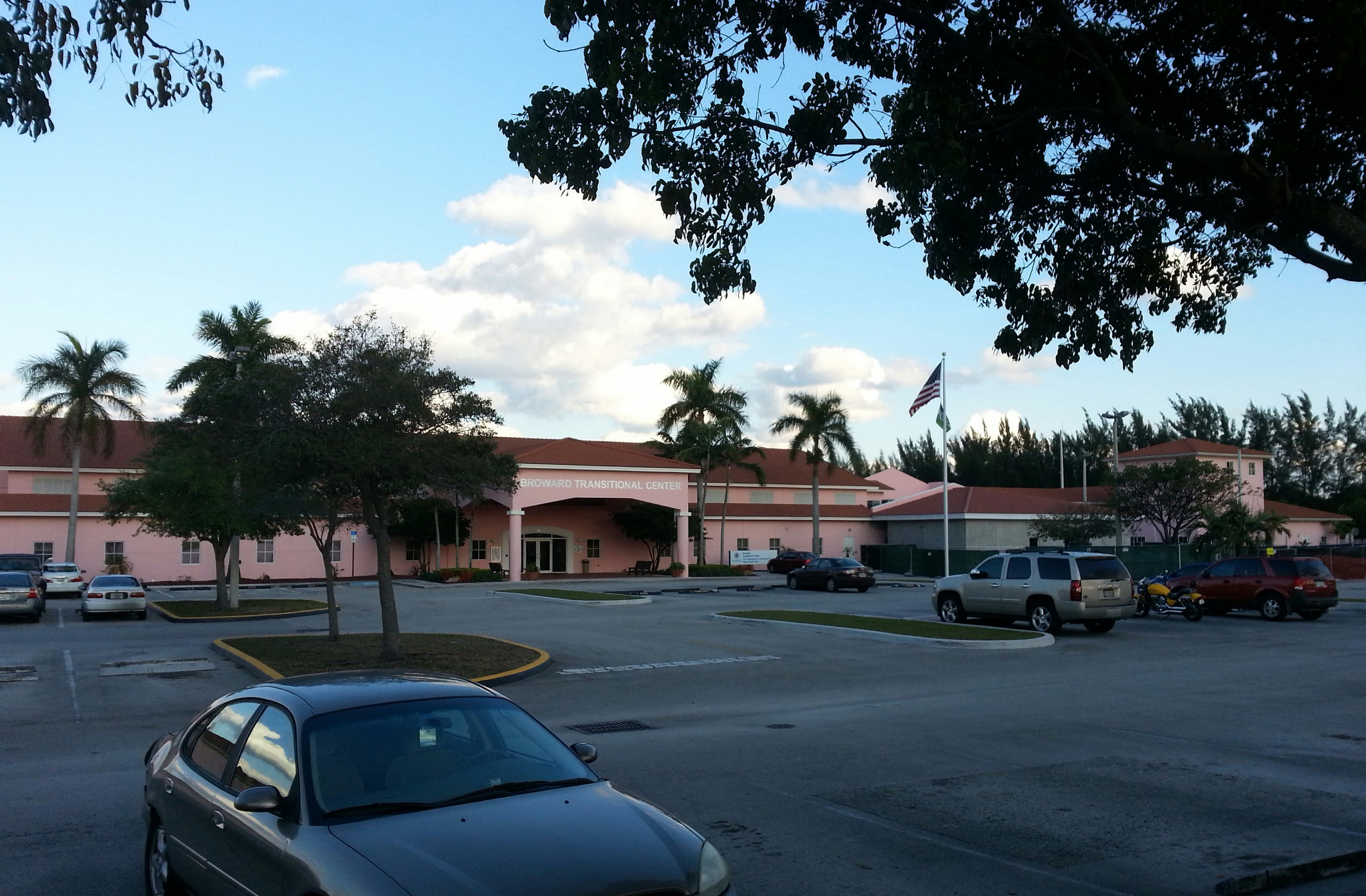
Broad view of the Broward Transitional Center in Pompano Beach, Florida

The Broward Transitional Center (BTC) is a for-profit detention center located in Pompano Beach, Florida. It is owned and operated by the GEO Group under a twenty-million-dollar plus annual contract with Immigration and Customs Enforcement (ICE), purposed to hold alleged illegal immigrants classified as "non-criminal and low security detainees."

Twenty-six members of Congress, including Ted Deutsch, Alcee Hastings and Frederica Wilson, signed a letter to ICE Director John T. Morton, urging a “case-by-case” review of each individual detainee placed there, and an investigation of the cases detainees cited at Broward Transitional Center after allegations of lack of sufficient medical care for undocumented detainees. This included a detainee who underwent ovarian surgery and was locked back up in her cell the same day, still bleeding, and a man who urinated blood for days but was prevented from seeing a doctor. Rep. Luis Gutierrez said that after hearing cases of low-priority with serious health issues failing to receive adequate attention, he signed Rep. Ted Deutch's letter. A federal lawsuit documented the complaints two Brazilian immigrants held at the Center who say they're not receiving their prescribed medication.

Serafin Solorzano, a former detainee from Nicaragua, was denied the use of his asthma inhaler during a two-week detention at BTC in 2010. He said he felt like he would suffocate. At a May 2012 Palm Beach protest of the GEO Group he said: “This is something that has violated my human rights."

The lockup holds immigrants whose offenses are nonviolent or who have no previous criminal history, and can house recent arrivals seeking asylum or residency. Deutsch's letter has gone unanswered by Morton.

The facility was the subject of the 2019 film, "The Infiltrators."

== See also ==
- Prison–industrial complex
