= Adelanto ICE detention facilities =

Immigrant detention facility in California, United States

- Interactive map of Adelanto ICE detention facilities
- Location: 10250, 10400, and 10450 Rancho Rd, Adelanto, California 92301; 34°33′37″N 117°26′14″W
- Status: Open
- Security class: Mixed security
- Capacity: c. 2000
- Opened: East wing: August 2011; West wing: July 2012; Desert View Annex: (uncertain)
- Managed by: GEO Group

Location of Adelanto in San Bernardino County, and San Bernardino County in California

The Adelanto ICE detention facilities are a privately operated immigration detention center in Adelanto, San Bernardino County, California. Operated by the GEO Group, they comprise a cluster of three adjacent facilities. Adelanto East was an existing prison that was purchased in June 2010 from the City of Adelanto, with a capacity of about 600 inmates; the newly built Adelanto West facility was completed in August 2012, with another 700 beds. After an additional expansion in 2015, the facility can accommodate up to 1,940 immigrant detainees of all classification levels, with an average stay of 30 days.

== History ==
From 1991 Adelanto was a state prison for adult male inmates. The GEO Group purchased the facility in 2010 and in May 2011, contracted with the U.S. Immigration and Customs Enforcement (ICE) to house federal immigration detainees. Based on the agreement, the center must comply with ICE’s 2011 Performance-Based National Detention Standards, which establish requirements for environmental health and safety, detainee care, activities, and grievance system. The GEO Group also receives a fee of up to about $112 per day per detainee from U.S. Immigration and Customs Enforcement, with the city of Adelanto serving as a go-between. This used a complicated subcontracting model so ICE and Adelanto didn't need to award the contract for the center’s operations using competitive bidding as required under Federal regulations.

In 2016, the city of Adelanto extended the company’s contract until 2021. The Department of Homeland Security purchased the three facilities in 2026 while GEO will continue to manage them under the existing contract through Dec. 19, 2034.

Average daily population at Adelanto ICE Processing Center
Fiscal year	ADP
FY 2011	19
FY 2012	587
FY 2013	1,081
FY 2014	1,209
FY 2015	1,180
FY 2016	1,472
FY 2017	1,745
FY 2019	1,711
FY 2020	1,291
FY 2021	276
FY 2022	138
FY 2023	219
FY 2024	396
FY 2025	999
FY 2026	2,218

== Conditions ==
The prison, then ICE's newest and largest in California, was the scene of small immigration protests in November 2013.

Since its opening as an ICE detention center in 2011, Adelanto Detention Facility has faced accusations of insufficient medical care and poor conditions. Because of the poor conditions, in July 2015, 29 members of Congress sent a letter to ICE and federal inspectors requesting an investigation addressing their concerns. Later that year in November, 400 detainees went on a hunger strike, to demand better medical and dental care.

In May 2018, government inspectors from the Department of Homeland Security (DHS) made a surprise visit to the detention center where 307 contract guards oversaw 1,659 immigrant detainees housed in different facilities around the center. Inspectors found multiple violations of ICE detention standards which posed significant health and safety risks for detainees and restricted detainees' rights. The violations found were: nooses in detainee cells, inappropriate segregation including misuse of solitary confinement, improperly handcuffed and shackled, and detainees with limited English lacked communication assistance; and untimely and inadequate detainee medical care.

During the COVID-19 pandemic, a lawsuit was filed on behalf of six detainees with medical conditions due to inadequate sanitation and beds placed too close together. These conditions provided an “ideal incubation” opportunity for coronavirus.

== Hernandez v. Sessions ==
Hernandez v. Sessions is a class action lawsuit filed in April 2016 by the ACLU and pro bono lawyers from Skadden, Arps, Slate, Meagher & Flom. Lead plaintiffs in the case were non-citizens who were detained at Adelanto Detention Facility due to their inability to afford the bond set by immigration officials. In October 2017, the U.S. Court of Appeals for the Ninth Circuit affirmed a district court’s order granting a classwide preliminary injunction in favor the plaintiffs. The Hernandez decision is the first court case to impose due process requirements in the immigration context and requires ICE officers and immigration judges to consider a person's financial ability to post bond and suitability for non-monetary alternative conditions of supervision when considering the conditions of release.
