= Otero County Prison Facility =

Men's prison in Chaparral, New Mexico, United States

Coordinates: 32°04′43″N 106°16′43″W

- Interactive map of Otero County Prison Facility
- Location: 26 McGregor Range Road Chaparral, New Mexico
- Status: maximum
- Capacity: 1420
- Opened: 2003
- Managed by: Management and Training Corporation
- Director: Hector Rios

The Otero County Prison Facility is a privately managed prison for men located in Chaparral, Otero County, New Mexico, operated by the Management and Training Corporation. The facility opened in 2003, and has a capacity of 1420.

Otero County is the owner of the facility. Clients include the state, which began sending about 300 sex offenders to the institution beginning in early 2013. Most of the facility is dedicated to housing federal prisoners of the United States Marshals Service, U.S. Immigration and Customs Enforcement, and the Federal Bureau of Prisons.

A 2011 ACLU report was highly critical of prison conditions in Otero County, access to legal resources, and the level of health care provided. As of December 2017, the ICE Processing Center at Otero County "landed at the center of ongoing controversy surrounding private prisons and ICE detention" when a report of the Department of Homeland Security Office of Inspector General found that conditions undermined the rights of detainees meant to be held in civil, not punitive, custody.

In 2018, some of the detained immigrant parents affected by the Trump administration family separation policy were housed at Otero County.
