= Index of Vermont-related articles =

The location of the state of Vermont in the United States of America

The following is an alphabetical list of articles related to the U.S. state of Vermont.

== 0–9 ==
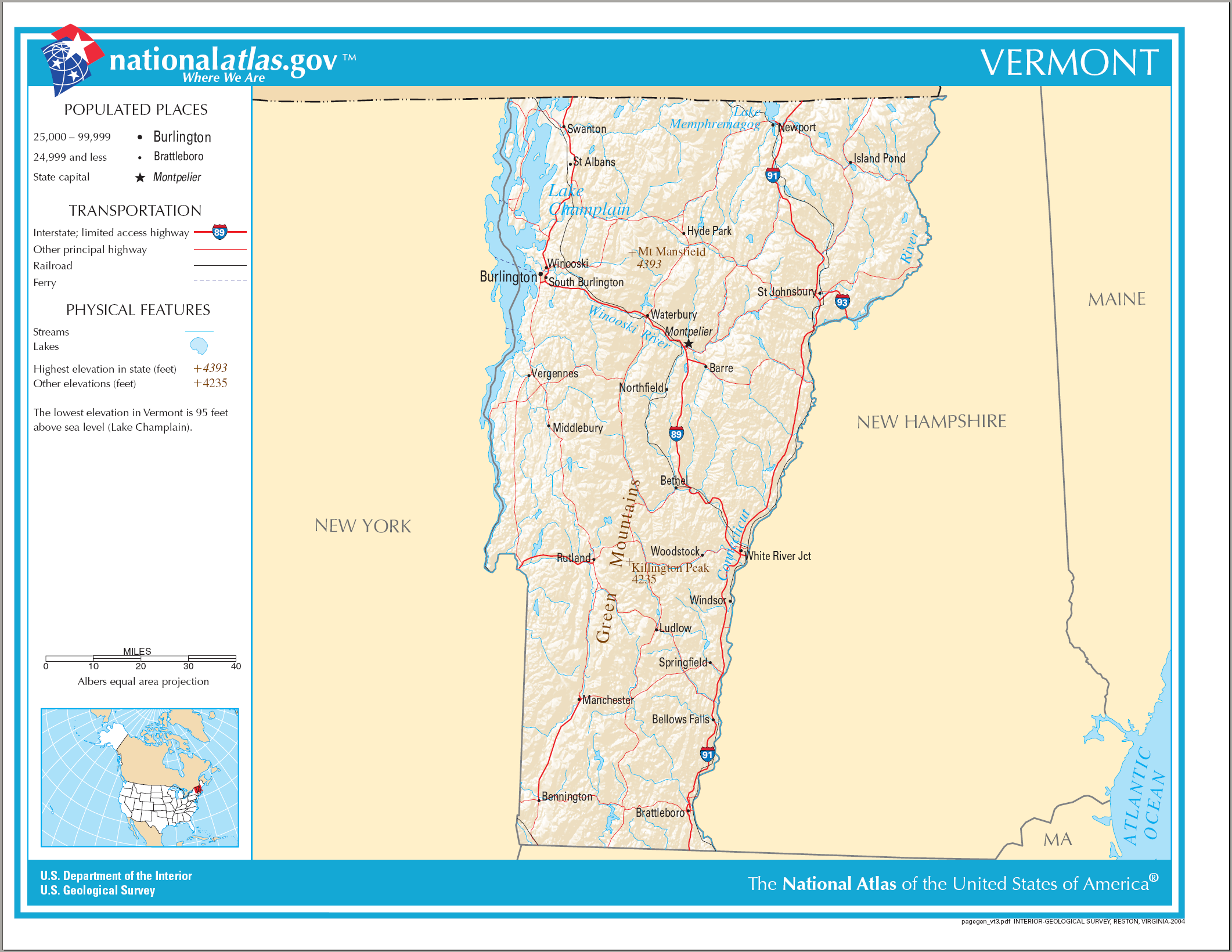
An enlargeable map of the state of Vermont

- .vt.us – Internet second-level domain for the state of Vermont
- 14th state to join the United States of America

== A ==
- Addison County, Vermont
- Adjacent states and province:
  - Commonwealth of Massachusetts
  - Province de Québec
  - State of New Hampshire
  - State of New York
- Agriculture in Vermont
- Airports in Vermont
- Aquaria in Vermont
  - commons:Category:Aquaria in Vermont
- Archaeology in Vermont
- Architecture in Vermont
- Area codes in Vermont
- Art museums and galleries in Vermont
  - commons:Category:Art museums and galleries in Vermont

== B ==
- Bennington County, Vermont
- Botanical gardens in Vermont
  - commons:Category:Botanical gardens in Vermont
- Buildings and structures in Vermont
  - commons:Category:Buildings and structures in Vermont
- Burlington, Vermont

== C ==
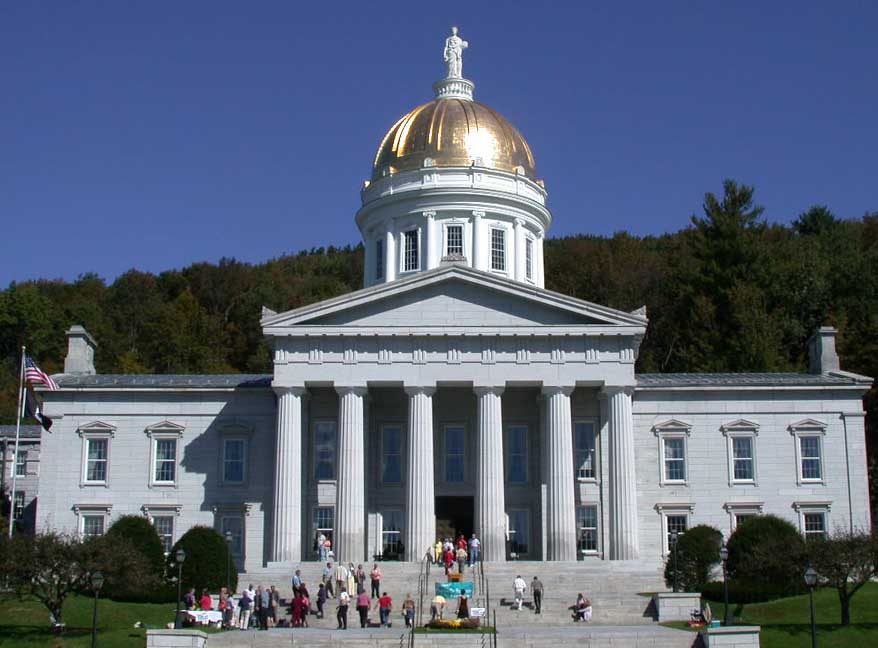
The Vermont State House in Montpelier

The Coat of Arms of the State of Vermont

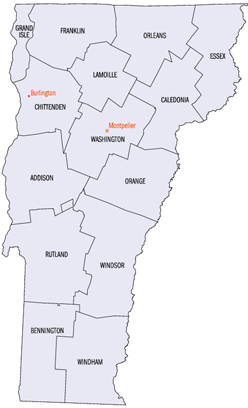
An enlargeable map of the 14 counties of the State of Vermont

- Caledonia County, Vermont
- Capital of the State of Vermont
- Capitol of the State of Vermont
  - commons:Category:Vermont State Capitol
- Catamount Library Network
- Census statistical areas of Vermont
- Chittenden County, Vermont
- Cities in Vermont
  - commons:Category:Cities in Vermont
- Climate change in Vermont
- Climate of Vermont
- Coat of Arms of the State of Vermont
- Colleges and universities in Vermont
  - commons:Category:Universities and colleges in Vermont
- Communications in Vermont
  - commons:Category:Communications in Vermont
- Companies in Vermont
- Constitution of the State of Vermont
- Counties of the State of Vermont
  - commons:Category:Counties in Vermont
- CRAG-VT
- Cuisine of Vermont
  - commons:Category:Vermont cuisine
- Culture of Vermont
  - commons:Category:Vermont culture

== D ==
- Dean, Howard
- Demographics of Vermont

== E ==
- Earth Peoples Park
- Economy of Vermont
  - Category:Economy of Vermont
    - commons:Category:Economy of Vermont
- Education in Vermont
  - Category:Education in Vermont
    - commons:Category:Education in Vermont
- Elections in Vermont
  - commons:Category:Elections in Vermont
- Energy in Vermont
- Environment of Vermont
  - commons:Category:Environment of Vermont
- Essex County, Vermont

== F ==
The Flag of the State of Vermont

- Festivals in Vermont
  - commons:Category:Festivals in Vermont
- Flag of the State of Vermont
- Forts in Vermont
  - Category:Forts in Vermont
    - commons:Category:Forts in Vermont
- Franklin County, Vermont

== G ==
The Great Seal of the State of Vermont

- Geography of Vermont
  - Category:Geography of Vermont
    - commons:Category:Geography of Vermont
- Geology of Vermont
  - commons:Category:Geology of Vermont
- Ghost towns in Vermont
  - Category:Ghost towns in Vermont
    - commons:Category:Ghost towns in Vermont
- Government of the State of Vermont website
  - Category:Government of Vermont
    - commons:Category:Government of Vermont
- Governor of the State of Vermont
  - List of governors of Vermont
- Grand Isle County, Vermont
- Great Seal of the State of Vermont

== H ==
- Heritage railroads in Vermont
  - commons:Category:Heritage railroads in Vermont
- High schools of Vermont
- Higher education in Vermont
- Highway routes in Vermont
- Hiking trails in Vermont
  - commons:Category:Hiking trails in Vermont
- History of Vermont
  - Historical outline of Vermont
    - Category:History of Vermont
      - commons:Category:History of Vermont
- Hospitals in Vermont
- House of Representatives of the State of Vermont
- Housing Vermont

== I ==
- Images of Vermont
  - commons:Category:Vermont

== L ==
- Lakes in Vermont
  - Lake Champlain
  - Category:Lakes of Vermont
    - commons:Category:Lakes of Vermont
- Lamoille County, Vermont
- Landmarks in Vermont
  - commons:Category:Landmarks in Vermont
- Lieutenant Governor of Vermont
- Lists related to Vermont:
  - List of airports in Vermont
  - List of census statistical areas in Vermont
  - List of cities in Vermont
  - List of colleges and universities in Vermont
  - List of counties in Vermont
  - List of dams and reservoirs in Vermont
  - List of forts in Vermont
  - List of ghost towns in Vermont
  - List of governors of Vermont
  - List of high schools in Vermont
  - List of highway routes in Vermont
  - List of hospitals in Vermont
  - List of lakes in Vermont
  - List of law enforcement agencies in Vermont
  - List of lieutenant governors of Vermont
  - List of museums in Vermont
  - List of National Historic Landmarks in Vermont
  - List of newspapers in Vermont
  - List of people from Vermont
  - List of power stations in Vermont
  - List of radio stations in Vermont
  - List of railroads in Vermont
  - List of Registered Historic Places in Vermont
  - List of rivers of Vermont
  - List of school districts in Vermont
  - List of state forests in Vermont
  - List of state parks in Vermont
  - List of state prisons in Vermont
  - List of symbols of the State of Vermont
  - List of telephone area codes in Vermont
  - List of television stations in Vermont
  - List of towns in Vermont
  - List of United States representatives from Vermont
  - List of United States senators from Vermont
  - List of Vermont's congressional delegations
  - List of Vermont's congressional districts

== M ==
- Maps of Vermont
  - commons:Category:Maps of Vermont
- Mass media in Vermont
- Montpelier, Vermont, state capital since 1805
- Monuments and memorials in Vermont
  - commons:Category:Monuments and memorials in Vermont
- Mountains of Vermont
  - commons:Category:Mountains of Vermont
- Museums in Vermont
  - Category:Museums in Vermont
    - commons:Category:Museums in Vermont
- Music of Vermont
  - Category:Music of Vermont
    - commons:Category:Music of Vermont
  - Category:Musical groups from Vermont
  - Category:Musicians from Vermont

== N ==
- National forests of Vermont
  - commons:Category:National Forests of Vermont
- Natural history of Vermont
  - commons:Category:Natural history of Vermont
- Nature centers in Vermont
  - commons:Category:Nature centers in Vermont
- New England
- Newspapers of Vermont

== O ==
- Orange County, Vermont
- Orleans County, Vermont
- Outdoor sculptures in Vermont
  - commons:Category:Outdoor sculptures in Vermont

== P ==
- People from Vermont
  - Category:People from Vermont
    - commons:Category:People from Vermont
    - Category:People from Vermont by populated place
    - Category:People from Vermont by county
    - Category:People from Vermont by occupation
- Politics of Vermont
  - Category:Politics of Vermont
    - commons:Category:Politics of Vermont
- Protected areas of Vermont
  - commons:Category:Protected areas of Vermont

== R ==
- Radio stations in Vermont
- Railroad museums in Vermont
  - commons:Category:Railroad museums in Vermont
- Railroads in Vermont
- Registered historic places in Vermont
  - commons:Category:Registered Historic Places in Vermont
- Religion in Vermont
  - Category:Religion in Vermont
    - commons:Category:Religion in Vermont
- Republic of New Connecticut
- Republic of Vermont
- Rivers of Vermont
  - commons:Category:Rivers of Vermont
- Rutland County, Vermont

== S ==
- Sanders, Bernie
- School districts of Vermont
- Scouting in Vermont
- Second Vermont Republic
- Secretary of the State of Vermont
- Senate of the State of Vermont
- Settlements in Vermont
  - Cities in Vermont
  - Towns in Vermont
  - Villages in Vermont
  - Census Designated Places in Vermont
  - Other unincorporated communities in Vermont
  - List of ghost towns in Vermont
- Ski areas and resorts in Vermont
  - commons:Category:Ski areas and resorts in Vermont
- Slavery in Vermont
- Solar power in Vermont
- Sports in Vermont
  - Category:Sports in Vermont
    - commons:Category:Sports in Vermont
  - Category:Sports venues in Vermont
    - commons:Category:Sports venues in Vermont
- St. Albans Raid
- State of Vermont website
  - Constitution of the State of Vermont
  - Government of the State of Vermont
    - Category:Government of Vermont
      - commons:Category:Government of Vermont
  - Executive branch of the government of the State of Vermont
    - Governor of the State of Vermont
  - Legislative branch of the government of the State of Vermont
    - Legislature of the State of Vermont
      - Senate of the State of Vermont
      - House of Representatives of the State of Vermont
  - Judicial branch of the government of the State of Vermont
    - Supreme Court of the State of Vermont
  - Vermont v. New Hampshire
- State parks of Vermont
  - commons:Category:State parks of Vermont
- State prisons of Vermont
- Structures in Vermont
  - commons:Category:Buildings and structures in Vermont
- Supreme Court of the State of Vermont
- Symbols of the State of Vermont
  - Category:Symbols of Vermont
    - commons:Category:Symbols of Vermont
- Sugar Mountain Farm

== T ==
- Telecommunications in Vermont
  - commons:Category:Communications in Vermont
- Telephone area codes in Vermont
- Television shows set in Vermont
- Television stations in Vermont
- Theatres in Vermont
  - commons:Category:Theatres in Vermont
- Tourism in Vermont website
  - commons:Category:Tourism in Vermont
- Towns in Vermont
  - commons:Category:Cities in Vermont
- Transportation in Vermont
  - Category:Transportation in Vermont
    - commons:Category:Transport in Vermont

== U ==
- United States of America
  - States of the United States of America
  - United States census statistical areas of Vermont
  - Vermont's congressional delegations
  - United States congressional districts in Vermont
  - United States Court of Appeals for the Second Circuit
  - United States District Court for the District of Vermont
  - United States representatives from Vermont
  - United States senators from Vermont
- Universities and colleges in Vermont
  - commons:Category:Universities and colleges in Vermont
- US-VT – ISO 3166-2:US region code for the State of Vermont

== V ==
The flag of the Vermont Republic

- Vermont website
  - Category:Vermont
    - commons:Category:Vermont
      - commons:Category:Maps of Vermont
- Vermont Commons: Voices of Independence
- Vermont Defendant Accommodation Project
- Vermont elections, 1860
- Vermont Foodbank
- Vermont Housing Finance Agency
- Vermont Organization of Koha Automated Libraries
- Vermont Republic, 1777–1791
  - Vermont copper
  - Flag of the Green Mountain Boys
  - Stella quarta decima
- Vermont State Colleges
- Vermont State House
- Vermont State Police
- Vermont Woods Studios
- Vermont World War II Army Airfields
- VT – United States Postal Service postal code for the State of Vermont

== W ==
- Washington County, Vermont
- Westminster, Vermont, capital of the Republic of New Connecticut 1777
  Wikimedia
  - Wikimedia Commons:Category:Vermont
    - commons:Category:Maps of Vermont
  - Wikinews:Category:Vermont
    - Wikinews:Portal:Vermont
  - Wikipedia Category:Vermont
    - Wikipedia:WikiProject Vermont
      - Category:WikiProject Vermont articles
      - Category:WikiProject Vermont participants
- Wind power in Vermont
- Windham County, Vermont
- Windsor County, Vermont
- Windsor, Vermont, capital of the Republic of New Connecticut 1777, the Vermont Republic 1777–1791, and the State of Vermont 1791-1805
- Witch window

== See also ==
- Topic overview:
  - Vermont
  - Outline of Vermont
