= List of immigration detention sites in the United States, 2007–2009 =

List of sites used by US Immigration and Customs Enforcement for detaining noncitizens

This is a list of migration-related detention sites in the United States active from 2007 to 2009. The United States maintains the largest immigration detention infrastructure in the world, which by the end of fiscal year 2007 included 961 sites either directly owned by or under contract with the federal government, according to the Freedom of Information Act Office of the ICE. During the period 2007-2009, no less than 363 detention sites were used.

Name	Status (year)	Location	Facility type	Security	Authority	Management	Capacity	Max single-day pop	Demographics and segregation
Ada County Jail	In use (2007)	Boise, Idaho	Prison	Secure	DHS/ ICE	Ada County Sheriff's Office		15 (2007)	
Adams County Jail	In use (2007)	Brighton, Colorado	Prison	Secure	DHS/ ICE			1 (2007)	
Aguadilla Service Processing Center (Aguadilla SPC)	In use (2009)	Aguadilla, Puerto Rico	Migrant detention centre	Secure	DHS/ ICE	ICE		121 (2007)	
Alamance County Detention Center	In use (2007)	Graham, North Carolina	Prison	Secure	DHS/ ICE	Alamance County Sheriff's Department		109 (2007)	
Albany County Jail	In use (2007)	Albany, New York	Prison	Secure	DHS/ ICE	New York State Commission of Correction		40 (2007)	
Albany County Jail	In use (2007)	Laramie, Wyoming	Prison	Secure	DHS/ ICE			14 (2007)	
Albuquerque Regional Correctional Center (Bernalillo County Detention Center)	In use (2009)	Albuquerque, New Mexico	Prison	Secure	DHS/ ICE		970 (2009)	824 (2007)	Adult males and females. Gender segregation. (2009)
Alexandria City Jail	In use (2007)	Alexandria, Virginia	Prison	Secure	DHS/ ICE	Alexandria Sheriff's Office		1 (2007)	
Allegheny County Jail	In use (2007)	Pittsburgh, Pennsylvania	Prison	Secure	DHS/ ICE	Allegheny County Bureau of Corrections	2,400 (2007)	100 (2007)	
Allenwood U.S. Penitentiary	In use (2007)	White Deer, Pennsylvania	Prison	Secure	DHS/ ICE	Federal Bureau of Prisons		1 (2007)	
Anchorage Jail	In use (2007)	Anchorage, Alaska	Prison	Secure	DHS/ ICE			4 (2007)	
Arapahoe County Jail	In use (2007)	Littleton, Colorado	Prison	Secure	DHS/ ICE			4 (2007)	
Arlington County Jail	In use (2007)	Arlington, Virginia	Prison	Secure	DHS/ ICE			61 (2007)	
Arthur Kill Correctional Facility	In use (2007)	Staten Island, New York	Prison	Secure	DHS/ ICE			1 (2007)	
Atlanta Field Office (Atlanta District Holding Room)	In use (2009)	Atlanta, Georgia	Immigration office	Secure	DHS/ ICE	ICE		66 (2007)	
Atlanta Pretrial Detention Center	In use (2007)	Atlanta, Georgia	Prison	Secure	DHS/ ICE	City of Atlanta, Department of Corrections		201 (2007)	
Aurora Contract Detention Facility (ICE Processing Center)	In use (2009)	Aurora, Colorado	Migrant detention centre	Secure	DHS/ ICE	GEO Group	400 (2007)	427 (2007)	Adult males and females; minors
Baltimore Field Office (formerly INS Baltimore Detention and Deportation, Bal DD&P)	In use (2009)	Baltimore, Maryland	Immigration office	Secure	DHS/ ICE	ICE		43 (2007)	
Baptist Children's Center (BCFS San Antonio)	In use (2008)	San Antonio, Texas	Other - shelter	Semi-secure		Baptist Child and Family Services	28 (2008)		
Barnstable County	In use (2008)	Barnstable, Massachusetts	Prison	Secure	DHS/ ICE		16 (2008) (for immigration detainees)	33 (2007)	No legal segregation
Basile Detention Center	In use (2007)	Basile, Louisiana	Prison	Secure	DHS/ ICE			63 (2007)	
Bay Point Schools	In use (2008)	Miami, Florida	Other - boarding school		Bay Point Schools				Minors only
Beaumont Federal Correctional Complex (Beaumont Federal Prison)	In use (2007)	Beaumont, Texas	Prison	Secure	DHS/ ICE	Federal Bureau of Prisons		1 (2007)	
Bedford City Jail	In use (2007)	Bedford, Texas	Prison	Secure	DHS/ ICE			53 (2007)	
Bedford Heights City Jail	In use (2007)	Bedford Heights, Ohio	Prison	Secure	DHS/ ICE	Bedford Heights Police Department		51 (2007)	Gender segregation; legal segregation
Bell County Jail	In use (2007)	Belton, Texas	Prison	Secure	DHS/ ICE			1 (2007)	
Benton County	In use (2007)	Kennewick, Washington	Prison	Secure	DHS/ ICE			16 (2007)	
Bergen County Jail	In use (2007)	Hackensack, New Jersey	Prison	Secure	DHS/ ICE			171 (2007)	
Berks County Family Shelter (Berks County Family Immigration Program)	In use (2007)	Leesport, Pennsylvania	Migrant detention centre	Secure	DHS/ ICE	U.S. Immigration and Customs Enforcement Bureau	84 (2007)	86 (2007)	Gender segregation; age segregation; family units
Berks County Juvenile (Berks County Youth Center)	In use (2007)	Leesport, Pennsylvania	Prison -juvenile detention	Secure	HHS/ ORR	County of Berks Children and Youth Services	78 (2007)	13 (2007)	Minors only; no legal segregation
Berks County Prison (Berks County Prison, PA)	In use (2007)	Leesport, Pennsylvania	Prison	Secure	DHS/ ICE	Berk County Sheriff's Department		42 (2007)	
Bexar County Jail	In use (2007)	San Antonio, Texas	Prison	Secure	DHS/ ICE			3 (2007)	
Federal Correctional Institution, Big Spring (formerly BSCC Airpark Unit)	In use (2009)	Big Spring, Texas	Prison	Secure	DHS/ ICE	GEO Group	2,646 (2009)	1 (2007)	
Blount County Justice Center	In use (2007)	Maryville, Tennessee	Prison	Secure	DHS/ ICE			23 (2007)	
Bokenkamp Children's Center	In use (2008)	Corpus Christi, Texas	Other - foster care / shelter	Semi-secure	HHS/ ORR	Bokenkamp Children's Center/ Lutheran Social Services			Minors only
Boone County Jail	In use (2007)	Burlington, Kentucky	Prison	Secure	DHS/ ICE	Boone County Sheriff's Department		108 (2007)	
Boston Service Processing Center (Coast Guard Support Facility)	In use (2007)	Boston, Massachusetts	Migrant detention centre	Secure	DHS/ ICE	U.S. Coast Guard		278 (2007)	
Boystown	In use (2008)	Miami, Florida	Other - shelter	Semi-secure	HHS/ ORR			65 (2007)	Minors only
BP STA Bellingham	In use (2007)	Bellingham, Washington			DHS/ ICE			1 (2007)	
Bradenton Detention Center (CLOSED)	Closed (2006)	Bradenton, Florida	Migrant detention centre	Secure	DHS/ ICE	Manatee County		2 (2007)	
Bristol County Correctional (Bristol County Jail and House of Correction)	In use (2008)	Dartmouth, Massachusetts	Prison	Secure	DHS/ ICE	Bristol County Sheriff's Department	238-272 (2008) (for immigration detainees)	289 (2007)	
Brooks County Jail (Contract)	In use (2007)	Falfurrias, Texas	Prison	Secure	DHS/ ICE			53 (2007)	
Broward Transitional Center (formerly Wackenhut Corrections Corporation)	In use (2009)	Pompano Beach, Florida	Migrant detention centre	Secure	DHS/ ICE	Geo Group (formerly Wackenhut Corrections Corporation)	600 (2009)	639 (2007)	
Buffalo Federal Detention Center (Service Processing Center)	In use (2009)	Batavia, New York	Migrant detention centre	Secure	DHS/ ICE	ICE	300 (2007) (for immigration detainees)	441 (2007)	
Butler County Jail	In use (2007)	El Dorado, Kansas	Prison	Secure	DHS/ ICE			35 (2007)	
Butner Federal Corrections Institution	In use (2007)	Butner, North Carolina	Prison	Secure	DHS/ ICE	Federal Bureau of Prisons		4 (2007)	
Calcasieu Parish Prison	In use (2007)	Lake Charles, Louisiana	Prison	Secure	DHS/ ICE			66 (2007)	
Caldwell County Detention Center	In use (2007)	Kingston, Missouri	Prison	Secure	DHS/ ICE	Caldwell County Sheriff's Office		110 (2007)	
Calhoun County correctional Center	In use (2007)	Battle Creek, Michigan	Prison	Secure	DHS/ ICE	Calhoun County Sheriff's Office	630 (2007)	218 (2007)	
Cambria County Jail	In use (2007)	Ebensburg, Pennsylvania	Prison	Secure	DHS/ ICE	Cambria County		54 (2007)	
Camp Dodge	In use (2007)	Johnston, Iowa (near Des Moines)	Ad hoc - facilities at Iowa National Guard	Secure	DHS/ ICE	Iowa National Guard		361 (2007)	
Canadian County Jail	In use (2007)	El Reno, Oklahoma	Prison	Secure	DHS/ ICE			17 (2007)	
Carroll County Detention Center	In use (2007)	Westminster, Maryland	Prison	Secure	DHS/ ICE	Carroll County		21 (2007)	
Carver County Juvenile Detention	In use (2007)	Chaska, Minnesota	Prison - juvenile	Secure	DHS/ ICE	Carver County Sheriff's Office	6 (2007)	51 (2007)	
Casa de San Juan (Catholic Charities)	In use (2007)	San Diego, California	Other - shelter		DHS/ ICE	Catholic Charities Diocese of San Diego	33 (2007) (for administrative detainees)	13 (2007)	Minors only; age segregation; family units
Cascade County Jail	In use (2007)	Great Falls, Montana	Prison	Secure	DHS/ ICE			1 (2007)	
Cass County Jail	In use (2007)	Plattsmouth, Nebraska	Prison	Secure	DHS/ ICE			60 (2007)	
Catholic Charities- Phoenix (Catholic Social Services)	In use (2008)	Phoenix, Arizona	Other - foster care		HHS/ ORR		9 (2007)	14 (2007)	Minors only
Catholic Community Services	In use (2008)	Tacoma, Washington	Other - foster care	Semi-secure	HHS/ ORR	Catholic Community Services	9 (2007)	19 (2007)	Minors only
Cattaraugus County Jail	In use (2007)	Little Valley, New York	Prison	Secure	DHS/ ICE			1 (2007)	
Cayuga County Jail	In use (2007)	Auburn, New York	Prison	Secure	DHS/ ICE			5 (2007)	
Central Arizona Detention Center	In use (2008)	Florence, Arizona	Prison	Secure	DHS/ ICE	Corrections Corporation of America	2,304 (2008)	114 (2007)	
Central Texas Detention Facility (formerly Wackenhut Facility)	In use (2009)	San Antonio, Texas	Prison	Secure	DHS/ ICE	GEO Group	688 (2009)	190 (2007)	
Charleston County Detention Center (Charleston County Correctional)	In use (2007)	Charleston, South Carolina	Prison	Secure	DHS/ ICE	Charleston County Sheriff's Department		85 (2007)	
Chase County Jail	In use (2007)	Falls, Kansas	Prison	Secure	DHS/ ICE			51 (2007)	
Chautauqua County Jail	In use (2007)	Mayville, New York	Prison	Secure	DHS/ ICE			20 (2007)	
Chelan County Regional Jail	In use (2007)	Wenatchee, Washington	Prison	Secure	DHS/ ICE			23 (2007)	
Children's Center Inc.	In use (2008)	Galveston, Texas	Other - shelter	Semi-secure	HHS/ ORR			48 (2007)	Minors only
Children's Village-Dobbs Ferry (TRAC Program)	In use (2008)	Dobbs Ferry, New York	Other - shelter	Semi-secure	HHS/ ORR	Children's Village	12 (2009)		Minors only
Children's Village-Queens (TRAC Program)	In use (2008)	Flushing, Queens, New York	Other - shelter	Semi-secure	HHS/ ORR	Children's Village	24 (2009)		Minors only
Chippewa County Jail	In use (2007)	Sault St. Marie, Michigan	Prison	Secure	DHS/ ICE	Chippewa County Sheriff's Department	190 (2007)	33 (2007)	
Christian County Sheriff's Office	In use (2007)	Ozark, Missouri	Prison - police lock up	Secure	DHS/ ICE			67 (2007)	
Citrus County Detention Facility	In use (2007)	Lecanto, Florida	Prison	Secure	DHS/ ICE	Citrus County Sheriff's Department		60 (2007)	
Clarke Frederick Winch Regional Jail	In use (2007)	Winchester, Virginia	Prison	Secure	DHS/ ICE			16 (2007)	
Clinton County Correctional Facility	In use (2007)	McElhattan, Pennsylvania	Prison	Secure	DHS/ ICE			119 (2007)	
Clinton County Jail	In use (2007)	Plattsburgh, New York	Prison	Secure	DHS/ ICE			34 (2007)	
Colquitt County Jail (Colquitt County Prison)	In use (2007)	Moultrie, Georgia	Prison	Secure	DHS/ ICE			43 (2007)	
Columbia County Jail	In use (2007)	St. Helens, Oregon	Prison	Secure	DHS/ ICE	Columbia County Sheriff's Department		54 (2007)	
Comal County Jail	In use (2007)	New Braunfels, Texas	Prison	Secure	DHS/ ICE	Comal County Sheriff's Office	337 (2007)	1 (2007)	
Comfort Suites Hotel	In use (2007)	Miami, Florida	Ad hoc - hotel		DHS/ ICE	Comfort Suites Hotel	"As needed"	1 (2007)	
Conejos County Jail	In use (2007)	Conejos, Colorado	Prison	Secure	DHS/ ICE			1 (2007)	
Corpus Christi Facility	In use (2007)	Corpus Christi, Texas			HHS/ ORR			78 (2007)	Minors only
Correctional Services Corporation South Fulton Municipal Jail	In use (2007)	Union City, Georgia	Prison	Secure	DHS/ ICE	Correctional Services Corporation		1 (2007)	
Crittenton	In use (2007)	Fullerton, California	Other - shelter	Semi-secure	HHS/ ORR	Crittenton Services for Children and Families	50 (2007)		Minors only
Cumberland County Jail	In use (2007)	Portland, Maine	Prison	Secure	DHS/ ICE			68 (2007)	
Dale Haile Detention Center (Haile Detention Center)	In use (2007)	Caldwell, Idaho	Prison	Secure	DHS/ ICE	Canyon County Sheriff's Office		28 (2007)	
Dallas Field Office (Dallas Field Office Holdroom)	In use (2009)	Dallas, Texas	Immigration office	Secure	DHS/ ICE	ICE		71 (2007)	
Dearborn Police Department	In use (2007)	Dearborn, Michigan	Prison - police lock up	Secure	DHS/ ICE	Dearborn Police Department		25 (2007)	
Denver County Jail	In use (2007)	Denver, Colorado	Prison	Secure	DHS/ ICE			3 (2007)	
Detroit Field Office (U.S. Immigration, Detroit)	In use (2009)	Detroit, Michigan	Immigration office	Secure	DHS/ ICE	ICE		1 (2007)	
Devereux	In use (2008)	Scottsdale, Arizona	Other - shelter	Semi-secure	HHS/ ORR	Devereux Arizona	23 (2007)	32 (2007)	Minors only
Dickens County Detention Center	In use (2007)	Spur, Texas	Prison	Secure	DHS/ ICE			49 (2007)	
Dodge County Detention Facility (Dodge County Jail)	In use (2007)	Juneau, Wisconsin	Prison	Secure	DHS/ ICE	Dodge County Sheriff's Department		182 (2007)	
Dorado Beach Airport (Airport DDP)	In use (2007)	Isla Verde, Puerto Rico	Transit Zone - Airport	Secure	DHS/ ICE			38 (2007)	
Dorchester County Detention Center	In use (2007)	Cambridge, Maryland	Prison	Secure	DHS/ ICE			76 (2007)	
Douglas County Correctional	In use (2007)	Omaha, Nebraska	Prison	Secure	DHS/ ICE			120 (2007)	
Douglas County Jail	In use (2007)	Castle Rock, Colorado	Prison	Secure	DHS/ ICE			16 (2007)	
Econolodge Hotel	In use (2007)	Tukwila, Washington	Ad hoc - hotel		DHS/ ICE	Econolodge Motel	"As needed"		
El Centro Detention Facility (Service Processing Center)	In use (2009)	El Centro, California	Migrant detention centre	Secure	DHS/ ICE	ICE		529 (2007)	
El Paso County Jail	In use (2007)	Springs, Colorado	Prison	Secure	DHS/ ICE			20 (2007)	
El Paso Service Processing Center	In use (2009)	El Paso, Texas	Migrant detention centre	Secure	DHS/ ICE	ICE	800 (2009)	919 (2007)	
Elgin Police Department	In use (2007)	Elgin, Illinois	Prison - Police lock up	Secure	DHS/ ICE			1 (2007)	
Elizabeth Contract Detention Center (Elizabeth Detention Center)	In use (2009)	Elizabeth, New Jersey	Migrant detention centre	Secure	DHS/ ICE	Corrections Corporation of America	300 (2009)	322 (2007)	
Eloy Detention Center (Eloy Federal Contract Facility)	In use (2009)	Eloy, Arizona	Migrant detention centre	Secure	DHS/ ICE	Corrections Corporation of America	1,500 (2009)	1,618 (2007)	
Erie County Holding Center	In use (2007)	Buffalo, New York	Prison	Secure	DHS/ ICE	Erie County Sheriff's Office	680 (2007)	20 (2007)	
Erie County Jail	In use (2007)	Erie, Pennsylvania	Prison	Secure	DHS/ ICE	Erie County Sheriff's Office	40 (2007)	17 (2007)	
Etowah County Jail	In use (2007)	Gadsden, Alabama	Prison	Secure	DHS/ ICE	Etowah County Sheriff's Department		389 (2007)	
Euless City Jail	In use (2007)	Euless, Texas	Prison	Secure	DHS/ ICE			52 (2007)	
Federal Correctional Institution - Cumberland (FCI Cumberland)	In use (2007)	Cumberland, Maryland	Prison	Secure	DHS/ ICE	Federal Bureau of Prisons		1 (2007)	
Federal Medical Center - Devens (FCM Devens)	In use]] (2008)	Ayer, Massachusetts	Prison - hospital	Secure	DHS/ ICE	Federal Bureau of Prisons		1 (2007)	
Florence Correctional Center	In use (2008)	Florence, Arizona	Prison	Secure	DHS/ ICE	Corrections Corporation of America	1,824 (2008)	241 (2007)	
Florence Federal Correctional Complex (FCC Florence)	In use (2007)	Florence, Colorado	Prison	Secure	DHS/ ICE	Federal Bureau of Prisons		1 (2007)	
Florence Services Processing Center (Florence Staging Facility)	In use (2009)	Florence, Arizona	Migrant detention centre	Secure	DHS/ ICE	ICE		592 (2007)	
Forsyth County Jail	In use (2007)	Winston-Salem, North Carolina	Prison	Secure	DHS/ ICE			1 (2007)	
Franklin County Correctional (Greenfield House of Correction)	In use (2008)	Greenfield, Massachusetts	Prison	Secure	DHS/ ICE	Franklin County's Sheriff Office	69 (2008) (for immigration detainees)	99 (2007)	No legal segregation
Franklin County Jail	In use (2007)	St. Albans, Vermont	Prison	Secure	DHS/ ICE	Franklin County Sheriff's Office	20 (2007)	27 (2007)	
Frederick County Detention Center	In use (2007)	Frederick, Maryland	Prison	Secure	DHS/ ICE			16 (2007)	
Fremont County Jail	In use (2007)	Canon City, Colorado	Prison	Secure	DHS/ ICE			13 (2007)	
Frio County Jail	In use (2007)	Pearsall, Texas	Prison	Secure	DHS/ ICE	GEO Group	391 (2009)	46 (2007)	
Garfield County Jail	In use (2007)	Glenwood Springs, Colorado	Prison	Secure	DHS/ ICE			42 (2007)	
Garvin County Jail	In use (2007)	Pauls Valley, Oklahoma	Prison	Secure	DHS/ ICE			45 (2007)	
Gaston County Jail	In use (2007)	Gastonia, North Carolina	Prison	Secure	DHS/ ICE			1 (2007)	
Genesee County Jail	In use (2007)	Batavia, New York	Prison	Secure	DHS/ ICE	Genessee County Sheriff's Office	80 (2007)	16 (2007)	
Gila County Juvenile Detention Center	In use (2007)	Globe, Arizona	Prison- juvenile	Secure	DHS/ ICE	Gila County		1 (2007)	
Glades County Detention Center	In use (2007)	Moore Haven, Florida	Prison	Secure	DHS/ ICE	Glades County Sheriff's Department	440 (2007)	314 (2007)	
Grand Forks County Correctional	In use (2007)	Grand Forks, North Dakota	Prison	Secure	DHS/ ICE			23 (2007)	
Grand Forks Juvenile Center	In use (2007)	Grand Forks, North Dakota	Prison - juvenile detention	Secure	DHS/ ICE				
Grant County Jail	In use (2007)	Canyon City, Oregon	Prison	Secure	DHS/ ICE	Grant County Sheriff's Office		1 (2007)	
Grayson County Jail	In use (2007)	Leitchfield, Kentucky	Prison	Secure	DHS/ ICE			52 (2007)	
Guadalupe City Jail	In use (2007)	Seguin, Texas	Prison	Secure	DHS/ ICE			26 (2007)	
Guadalupe County Juvenile Detention	In use (2007)	Seguin, Texas	Prison - juvenile detention	Secure	DHS/ ICE			1 (2007)	
Guam Department of Corrections (Department of Corrections)	In use (2007)	Agana, Guam	Prison	Secure	DHS/ ICE	Department of Corrections Guam		33 (2007)	
Guantanamo Bay Migrant Operations Center	In use (2009)	Guantanamo Bay, Cuba			DHS/ ICE	GEO Group	130 (2009)		Adult males and females; families; minors.
Hamilton County Jail	In use (2007)	Chattanooga, Tennessee	Prison	Secure	DHS/ ICE			2 (2007)	
Hampton Roads Regional Jail	In use (2007)	Portsmouth, Virginia	Prison	Secure	DHS/ ICE			200 (2007)	
Hardin County Jail	In use (2007)	Eldora, Iowa	Prison	Secure	DHS/ ICE			88 (2007)	
Harlingen Field Office (Harlingen Staging Facility)	In use (2009)	Harlingen, Texas	Immigration office	Secure	DHS/ ICE	ICE		224 (2007)	
Harris County Jail	In use (2007)	Hamilton, Georgia	Prison	Secure	DHS/ ICE	Harris County Sheriff's Department		15 (2007)	
Hartford Correctional Center	In use (2007)	Hartford, Connecticut	Prison	Secure	DHS/ ICE			116 (2007)	
Heartland International Children's Center (Heartland/ICC)	In use (2008)	Chicago, Illinois	Other - shelter	Semi-secure	HHS/ ORR	Heartland International Children's Center (Heartland/ICC)			Minors only
Honolulu Federal Detention Center	In use (2007)	Honolulu, Hawaii	Prison	Secure	DHS/ ICE	Federal Bureau of Prisons		73 (2007)	
Houston Field Office (Houston FO Holdroom)	In use (2009)	Houston, Texas	Immigration office	Secure	DHS/ ICE	ICE	"As needed"	86 (2007)	
Houston Processing Center (Houston Contract Detention Facility)	In use (2009)	Houston, Texas	Migrant detention centre	Secure	DHS/ ICE	Corrections Corporation of America	905 (2009)	979 (2007)	
Howard County Detention Center	In use (2007)	Jessup, Maryland	Prison	Secure	DHS/ ICE			44 (2007)	
Hudson County Jail	In use (2007)	Kearney, New Jersey	Prison	Secure	DHS/ ICE	Hudson County Sheriff's Office		360 (2007)	
International Education Services	In use (2008)	Brownsville, Texas	Other - foster care / shelter	Semi-secure	HHS/ ORR	International Education Services	53 (2007)		Minors only
International Education Services (IES Shelter)	In use (2008)	Los Fresnos, Texas	Other - shelter	Semi-secure	HHS/ ORR	International Education Services, Inc.	191 (2005)	390 (2007)	Minors only
International Education Services Welcome Shelter	In use (2008)	Harlingen, Texas	Other - shelter	Semi-secure	HHS/ ORR	International Education Services, Inc.	80 (2008)		Minors only
Jackson County Jail	In use (2007)	Medford, Oregon	Prison	Secure	DHS/ ICE			1 (2007)	
Jefferson County Downtown Jail	In use (2009)	Beaumont, Texas	Prison	Secure	DHS/ ICE	The GEO Group	500 (2007)	120 (2007)	
Jefferson County Jail	In use (2007)	Boulder, Montana	Prison	Secure	DHS/ ICE	Jefferson County Sheriff's Office		13 (2007)	
Jefferson County Jail	In use (2009)	Golden, Colorado	Prison	Secure	DHS/ ICE			29 (2007)	
Joe Corley Detention Facility	In use (2008)	Conroe, Texas	Migrant detention centre		USMS/ ICE	GEO Group	1,517		Adult males and females
Johnston County Jail (Johnston County Detention Center)	In use (2007)	Smithfield, North Carolina	Prison	Secure	DHS/ ICE	Johnston County Sheriff's Department	190 (2007)	31 (2007)	
Josephine County Jail	In use (2007)	Grants Pass, Oregon	Prison	Secure	DHS/ ICE	Josephine County Sheriff's Department		24 (2007)	
Juvenile Facility-Chicago (Tai Contract Facility)	In use (2007)	Chicago, Illinois	Prison - juvenile detention	Secure	HHS/ ORR			159 (2007)	Minors only
Karnes Correctional Center	In use (2009)	Karnes City, Texas	Prison	Secure	DHS/ ICE	The GEO Group, Inc.	679 (2009)	124 (2007)	
Kenosha County Jail	In use (2007)	Kenosha, Wisconsin	Prison	Secure	DHS/ ICE	Kenosha County Sheriff's Department		206 (2007)	
Kent County, Grand Rapids	In use (2007)	Grand Rapids, Michigan	Prison	Secure	DHS/ ICE			16 (2007)	
Kern County Jail	In use (2007)	Bakersfield, California	Prison	Secure	DHS/ ICE			219 (2007)	
Klamath County Jail	In use (2007)	Klamath Falls, Oregon	Prison	Secure	DHS/ ICE			13 (2007)	
Kodiak County Jail	In use (2007)	Kodiak, Alaska	Prison	Secure	DHS/ ICE			1 (2007)	
Krome Service Processing Center	In use (2009)	Miami, Florida	Migrant detention centre	Secure	DHS/ ICE	ICE/ Ahtna Technical Services, Inc.		1,006(2007)	
Lackawana County Jail	In use (2007)	Scranton, Pennsylvania	Prison	Secure	DHS/ ICE	Lackawanna County Sheriff's Office	1,200 (2007)	167 (2007)	
Lakeland Nursing Home	In use (2007)	Pineville, Louisiana	Other - Nursing home		DHS/ ICE	Lakeland Nursing Home		1 (2007)	
Laredo Detention Facility (Laredo Processing Center)	In use (2009)	Laredo, Texas	Migrant detention centre	Secure	DHS/ ICE	Corrections Corporation of America/ Webb County, Texas/ ICE	258 (2009)	695 (2007)	
Lasalle County Jail	In use (2007)	Cotulla, Texas	Prison	Secure	DHS/ ICE			33 (2007)	
LaSalle Detention Center	In use (2009)	Jena, Louisiana	Migrant detention centre	Secure	DHS/ ICE	Geo Group/ ICE Detention and Removal Operations	1,160 (2007)		
Lea County Jail	In use (2007)	Lovington, New Mexico	Prison	Secure	DHS/ ICE			47 (2007)	
Leavenworth Detention Center	In use (2007)	Leavenworth, Kansas	Prison	Secure	DHS/ ICE	Corrections Corporation of America		1 (2007)	
Limestone County Detention Center	In use (2009)	Groesbeck, Texas	Prison	Secure	DHS/ ICE	Community Education Centers Inc.	1,014 (2009)	158 (2007)	
Lincoln County Jail	In use (2007)	Troy, Missouri	Prison	Secure	DHS/ ICE	Lincoln County Sheriff's Office	221 (2007)	41 (2007)	
Linn County Correctional Center (Linn County Jail)	In use (2007)	Cedar Rapids, Iowa	Prison	Secure	DHS/ ICE	Linn County Sheriff		47 (2007)	
Lonoke Police Department Detention Center	In use (2007)	Lonoke, Arkansas	Prison - police lock up	Secure	DHS/ ICE			1 (2007)	
Los Angeles Federal Courthouse - Spring Street ("B-18")	In use (2009)	Los Angeles, California	Ad hoc courthouse	Secure		ICE			
Los Custody Case	In use (2007)	San Pedro, California	Migrant detention centre	Secure	DHS/ ICE	ICE	"As needed"	397 (2007)	
LSS El Paso (Lutheran Social Services of the South)	In use (2008)	El Paso, Texas	Other - shelter / foster care	Semi-secure	HHS/ ORR	Lutheran Social Services of the South	36 (2007)		Minors only
Lubbock County Jail	In use (2007)	Lubbock, Texas	Prison	Secure	DHS/ ICE			17 (2007)	
Lutheran Community Services Northwest	In use (2007)	Seattle, Washington	Other - foster care	Semi-secure	HHS/ ORR	Lutheran Community Services Northwest		4 (2007)	Minors only
Lutheran Social Services - Lansing	In use (2007)	Lansing, Michigan	Other - foster care	Semi-secure	HHS/ ORR	Lutheran Social Services of Michigan		1 (2007)	Minors only
Macomb County	In use (2007)	Mt. Clemens, Michigan	Prison	Secure	DHS/ ICE			22 (2007)	
Madison County Jail	In use (2007)	Rexburg, Idaho	Prison	Secure	DHS/ ICE			19 (2007)	
Madison County Jail	In use (2007)	Wampsville, New York	Prison	Secure	DHS/ ICE	Madison County Sheriff's Office	123 (2007)	6 (2007)	
Maple Heights City Jail	In use (2007)	Maple Heights, Ohio	Prison	Secure	DHS/ ICE	City of Maple Heights Police Department		29 (2007)	
Marin County Juvenile Hall	In use (2008)	San Rafael, California	Prison - juvenile detention	Secure	HHS/ ORR	Marin County	3 (2007)		Minors only
Marion County Jail	In use (2007)	Indianapolis, Indiana	Prison	Secure	DHS/ ICE			1 (2007)	
McClennan County Detention Center	In use (2007)	Waco, Texas	Prison	Secure	DHS/ ICE			110 (2007)	
McHenry County Sheriff's Office	In use (2007)	Woodstock, Illinois	Prison - police lock up	Secure	DHS/ ICE	McHenry County Sheriff		306 (2007)	
McKinley County Adult Detention Center	In use (2007)	Gallup, New Mexico	Prison	Secure	DHS/ ICE			13 (2007)	
McLaughlin Youth Center	In use (2007)	Anchorage, Alaska			DHS/ ICE		160 (2007)	4 (2007)	No legal segregation
Mecklenburg County Jail	In use (2007)	Charlotte, North Carolina	Prison	Secure	DHS/ ICE	Mecklenburg County Sheriff's Department		234 (2007)	
Memphis Federal Correctional Institution - Memphis (FCI Memphis)	In use (2007)	Memphis, Tennessee	Prison	Secure	DHS/ ICE	Federal Bureau of Prisons		1 (2007)	
Mercer County Jail	In use (2007)	Trenton, New Jersey	Prison	Secure	DHS/ ICE			3 (2007)	
Metropolitan Detention Center - Guaynabo (Guaynabo MDC)	In use (2007)	San Juan, Puerto Rico	Prison	Secure	DHS/ ICE	Federal Bureau of Prisons		104 (2007)	
Middlesex County Jail	In use (2007)	New Brunswick, New Jersey	Prison	Secure	DHS/ ICE	Middlesex County Sheriff's Office		238 (2007)	
Middleton House of Corrections (Essex County Jail)	In use (2008)	Middleton, Massachusetts	Prison	Secure	DHS/ ICE		34 (2008) (for immigration detainees)	29 (2007)	No legal segregation
Miller County Jail	In use (2007)	Texarkana, Arkansas	Prison	Secure	DHS/ ICE			48 (2007)	
Minicassia Detention Center	In use (2007)	Burley, Idaho	Prison	Secure	DHS/ ICE			1 (2007)	
Minnehaha County Jail	In use (2007)	Sioux Falls, South Dakota	Prison	Secure	DHS/ ICE			30 (2007)	
Mira Loma Detention Centre	In use (2009)	Lancaster, California	Prison	Secure	DHS/ ICE	Los Angeles County Sheriff's Department	1,400 (2009)	1,054 (2007)	
Mississippi County Detention Center	In use (2007)	Charleston, Missouri	Prison	Secure	DHS/ ICE	Mississippi County Sheriff's Office		58 (2007)	
Moffet County Jail	In use (2007)	Craig, Colorado	Prison	Secure	DHS/ ICE			20 (2007)	
Monmouth County Jail	In use (2007)	Freehold, New Jersey	Prison	Secure	DHS/ ICE			171 (2007)	
Monroe County Jail	In use (2007)	Key West, Florida	Prison	Secure	DHS/ ICE	Monroe County Sheriff's Department		70 (2007)	
Monroe County Jail	In use (2007)	Rochester, New York	Prison	Secure	DHS/ ICE			2 (2007)	
Montgomery County Correctional Facility (Montgomery County Jail)	In use (2007)	Norristown, Pennsylvania	Prison	Secure	DHS/ ICE	Montgomery County Sheriff's Department		27 (2007)	
Montgomery County Jail	In use (2007)	Montgomery City, Missouri	Prison	Secure	DHS/ ICE	Montgomery County Sheriff's Office	79 (2007)	69 (2007)	
Morgan County Jail	In use (2007)	Ft. Morgan, Colorado	Prison	Secure	DHS/ ICE			18 (2007)	
Morgan County Jail (Morgan County Sheriff's Department)	In use (2007)	Versailles, Missouri	Prison	Secure	DHS/ ICE	Morgan County Sheriff's Office	91 (2007)	73 (2007)	
Nassau County Jail	In use (2007)	Yulee, Florida	Prison	Secure	DHS/ ICE			25 (2007)	
Natrona County Jail	In use (2007)	Caspar, Wyoming	Prison	Secure	DHS/ ICE			1 (2007)	
New Hampshire State Prison-Concord	In use (2007)	Concord, New Hampshire	Prison	Secure	DHS/ ICE			2 (2007)	
New York City Field Office	In use (2009)	New York City, New York	Immigration office	Secure	DHS/ ICE	ICE		3 (2007)	
Niagara County Jail	In use (2007)	Lockport, New York	Prison	Secure	DHS/ ICE	New York State Commission of Correction		1 (2007)	
Nobles County Jail	In use (2007)	Worthington, Minnesota	Prison	Secure	DHS/ ICE			43 (2007)	
Norfolk County Correctional	In use (2008)	Dedham, Massachusetts	Prison	Secure	DHS/ ICE		60 (2008) (for immigration detainees)	44 (2007)	No legal segregation
North Georgia Detention Center	In use (2009)	Gainesville, Georgia	Migrant detention centre	Secure	DHS/ ICE	Corrections Corporation of America	510 (2009)		Adult males and females
North Las Vegas Detention Center	In use (2007)	Las Vegas, Nevada	Prison	Secure	DHS/ ICE	City of North Las Vegas Police Department		159 (2007)	
Northeast Ohio Correctional Center (CCA Northeast Ohio Corrections)	In use (2007)	Youngstown, Ohio	Prison	Secure	DHS/ ICE	Corrections Corporation of America	2,016 (2007)	1 (2007)	
Northern Oregon Correction Facility (NORCOR)	In use (2007)	The Dalles, Oregon	Prison	Secure	DHS/ ICE	Oregon State Police	212 (2007)	18 (2007)	
Northern Oregon Regional Juvenile Facility (NORCOR Juvenile Detention)	In use (2007)	The Dalles, Oregon	Prison - juvenile detention	Secure	DHS/ ICE	Gilliam, Hood River, Sherman and Wasco counties	32 (2007)	1 (2007)	No legal segregation
Northern Regional Jail	In use (2007)	Moundsville, West Virginia	Prison	Secure	DHS/ ICE			14 (2007)	
Northern Virginia Juvenile Detention Home (NOVA)	In use (2008)	Alexandria, Virginia	Prison - juvenile detention	Secure	DHS/ ICE		2 (2007		
Northwest Detention Center (Tacoma Contract Detention Facility)	In use (2009)	Tacoma, Washington	Migrant detention centre	Secure	DHS/ ICE	GEO Group	1,030 (2009)	1,081 (2007)	
Oakdale Federal Detention Center	In use (2007)	Oakdale, Louisiana	Prison	Secure	DHS/ ICE	Federal Bureau of Prisons		819 (2007)	
Oklahoma County Jail	In use (2007)	Oklahoma City, Oklahoma	Prison	Secure	DHS/ ICE	Oklahoma County Sheriff's Office		116 (2007)	
Old County Correctional Center	In use (2008)	Bridgewater, Massachusetts	Prison	Secure	DHS/ ICE	Massachusetts Department of Correction			No legal segregation
Omaha Field Office	In use (2007)	Omaha, Nebraska	Immigration office	Secure	DHS/ ICE	ICE	"As needed"	3 (2007)	
Oneida County Jail	In use (2007)	Oriskany, New York	Prison	Secure	DHS/ ICE	Oneida County Sheriff's Office	634 (2007)	1 (2007)	
Onondaga County Jail	In use (2007)	Syracuse, New York	Prison	Secure	DHS/ ICE			22 (2007)	
Ontario County Jail	In use (2007)	Canandaigua, New York	Prison	Secure	DHS/ ICE			27 (2007)	
Open Arms International	In use (2008)	Miami, Florida	Other - shelter	Semi-secure	HHS/ ORR	Open Arms International		36 (2007)	Minors only
Orange County Jail	In use (2007)	Orlando, Florida	Prison	Secure	DHS/ ICE	Orange County Sheriff's Department		37 (2007)	
Orleans Parish Sheriff	In use (2007)	New Orleans, Louisiana	Prison	Secure	DHS/ ICE	Orleans Parish Criminal Sheriff		164 (2007)	
Orr Foster Care	In use (2007)	Washington, DC	Other - Foster home		DHS/ ICE			47 (2007)	
Osborn Correctional Institute	In use (2007)	Somers, Connecticut	Prison	Secure	DHS/ ICE			33 (2007)	
Otay Detention Facility (San Diego Correctional Facility)	In use (2009)	San Diego, California	Prison	Secure	DHS/ ICE	Corrections Corporation of America	1,154 (2009)	1,017 (2007)	Adult males only
Otero County Detention	In use (2007)	Alamogordo, New Mexico	Prison	Secure	DHS/ ICE	County of Otero Sheriff's Office		17 (2007)	
Otero County Processing Center (formerly Otero County Prison)	In use (2009)	Chaparral, New Mexico	Migrant detention centre	Secure	DHS/ ICE	Management and Training Corporation	1.086	555 (2007)	
Palm Beach County Jail	In use (2007)	West Palm Beach, Florida	Prison	Secure	DHS/ ICE	Palm Beach County Sheriff's Department		37 (2007)	
Pamunkey Regional Jail	In use (2007)	Hanover, Virginia	Prison	Secure	DHS/ ICE			89 (2007)	
Park County Jail	In use (2007)	Fariplay, Colorado	Prison	Secure	DHS/ ICE			74 (2007)	
Passaic County Jail (CLOSED)	Closed (2007)	Paterson, New Jersey	Prison	Secure	DHS/ ICE / County Police	County Law Enforcement		1 (2007)	
Perry County Correctional Facility	In use (2007)	Uniontown, Alabama	Prison	Secure	DHS/ ICE	LCS Corrections Services	400 (2006)	535 (2007)	
Phelps County Jail	In use (2007)	Holdredge, Nebraska	Prison	Secure	DHS/ ICE			49 (2007)	
Philadelphia Field Office (Philadelphia District Office)	In use (2009)	Philadelphia, Pennsylvania	Immigration office	Secure	DHS/ ICE	ICE		80 (2007)	
Phoenix Field Office	In use (2007)	Phoenix, Arizona	Immigration office	Secure	DHS/ ICE	ICE	"As needed"		
Piedmont Regional Jail	In use (2007)	Farmville, Virginia	Prison	Secure	DHS/ ICE	Virginia Department of Corrections		328 (2007)	
Pike County Correctional (Pike County Jail)	In use (2007)	Milford, Pennsylvania	Prison	Secure	DHS/ ICE	Pike County Prison Board		139 (2007)	
Pinal County Jail (Pinal County Adult Detention Center)	In use (2009)	Florence, Arizona	Prison	Secure	DHS/ ICE	ICE	624 (2009)	358 (2007)	
Pine Prairie Correctional Center	In use (2007)	Pine Prairie, Louisiana	Prison	Secure	DHS/ ICE	LCS Corrections Services		678 (2007)	
Pinellas County Jail	In use (2007)	Clearwater, Florida	Prison	Secure	DHS/ ICE			1 (2007)	
Platte County Jail	In use (2007)	Platte City, Missouri	Prison	Secure	DHS/ ICE			32 (2007)	
Plymouth County Correctional (Plymouth House of Corrections)	In use (2008)	Plymouth, Massachusetts	Prison	Secure	DHS/ ICE	Plymouth County	232 (2008) (for immigration detainees)	231 (2007)	No legal segregation
Polk County Jail	In use (2007)	Des Moines, Iowa	Prison	Secure	DHS/ ICE			38 (2007)	
Polk County Jail	In use (2007)	Livingston, Texas	Prison	Secure	DHS/ ICE	Polk County Sheriff's Office		314 (2007)	
Pollock U.S. Penitentiary	In use (2007)	Pollock, Louisiana	Prison	Secure	DHS/ ICE	Federal Bureau of Prisons		1 (2007)	
Port Isabel Service Processing Center (Port Isabel Detention Center)	In use (2009)	Los Fresnos, Texas	Migrant detention centre	Secure	DHS/ ICE	ICE		1,179 (2007)	
Portland Field Office	In use (2007)	Portland, Oregon	Immigration office	Secure	DHS/ ICE	ICE		30 (2007)	
Pottawattamie County Jail	In use (2007)	Council Bluffs, Iowa	Prison	Secure	DHS/ ICE	Pottawattamie County Sheriff		56 (2007)	
Prince William Regional Jail	In use (2007)	Manassas, Virginia	Prison	Secure	DHS/ ICE			13 (2007)	
Pueblo County Jail	In use (2007)	Pueblo, Colorado	Prison	Secure	DHS/ ICE			3 (2007)	
Purgatory Correctional Facility (Washington County Jail)	In use (2007)	Hurricane, Utah	Prison	Secure	DHS/ ICE			55 (2007)	
Ramada Hotel	In use (2007)	East Boston, Massachusetts	Ad hoc - hotel	Secure	DHS/ ICE	Ramada		1 (2007)	
Ramsey Adult Detention Center and Annex (Ramsey ADC Annex, Service Processing Center)	In use (2007)	St. Paul, Minnesota	Prison	Secure	DHS/ ICE	Ramsey County Sheriff's Office		81 (2007)	
Randall County Jail	In use (2007)	Amarillo, Texas	Prison	Secure	DHS/ ICE			61 (2007)	
Ray Brook Federal Correctional Institution	In use (2007)	Ray Brook, New York	Prison	Secure	DHS/ ICE	Bureau of Prisons		1 (2007)	
Rice County Detention Center	In use (2007)	Lyons, Kansas	Prison	Secure	DHS/ ICE			28 (2007)	
Rio Grande Detention Center	Built 2007, in use (2016)	Laredo, Texas	Prison	Secure	Office of the Federal Detention Trustee	GEO Group			
Riverside Regional Jail	In use (2007)	Hopewell, Virginia	Prison	Secure	DHS/ ICE			61 (2007)	
Rochester Federal Medical Center	In use (2007)	Rochester, Minnesota	Prison - hospital	Secure	DHS/ ICE	Federal Bureau of Prisons		3 (2007)	
Rock Island County Jail	In use (2007)	Rock Island, Illinois	Prison	Secure	DHS/ ICE			16 (2007)	
Rockingham County Jail	In use (2007)	Brentwood, New Hampshire	Prison	Secure	DHS/ ICE	Rockingham County Sheriff's Department		16 (2007)	
Rockingham County Jail	In use (2007)	Harrisonburg, Virginia	Prison	Secure	DHS/ ICE			25 (2007)	
Rolling Plains Detention Center (Rolling Plains Regional Jail and Detention)	In use (2007)	Haskell, Texas	Prison	Secure	DHS/ ICE	Emerald Correctional Management		604 (2007)	
Sacramento County Jail	In use (2007)	Sacramento, California	Prison	Secure	DHS/ ICE			106 (2007)	
Salt Lake County Jail	In use (2007)	Salt Lake City, Utah	Prison	Secure	DHS/ ICE			14 (2007)	
San Bernardino County Jail	In use (2007)	San Bernardino, California	Prison	Secure	DHS/ ICE			84 (2007)	
San Diego Field Office (San Diego Staging)	In use (2009)	San Diego, California	Immigration office	Secure	DHS/ ICE	ICE	"As needed"	93 (2007)	
San Pedro Service Processing Center	Closed (2007)	San Pedro, California	Migrant detention centre	Secure	DHS/ ICE	ICE		613 (2007)	
Sangamon County Jail	In use (2007)	Springfield, Illinois	Prison	Secure	DHS/ ICE			16 (2007)	
Santa Ana City Jail	In use (2007)	Santa Ana, California	Prison	Secure	DHS/ ICE	City of Santa Ana		122 (2007)	
Santa Ana County Jail	In use (2007)	Santa Ana, California	Prison	Secure	DHS/ ICE			118 (2007)	
Santa Clara County Jail	In use (2007)	San Jose, California	Prison	Secure	DHS/ ICE	Santa Clara County Department of Correction		287 (2007)	
Sarpy County Juvenile	In use (2007)	Papillion, Nebraska	Prison - juvenile detention	Secure	DHS/ ICE		36 (2007)		No legal segregation
Seatac Federal Detention Center (FDC SeaTac)	In use (2007)	Seattle, Washington	Prison	Secure	DHS/ ICE	Federal Bureau of Prisons	677 (2007)	18 (2007)	
Sebastian County Detention Center	In use (2007)	Ft. Smith, Arizona	Prison	Secure	DHS/ ICE			23 (2007)	
Selma R. Carson Home (Pioneer Human Services)	In use (2008)	Fife, Washington	Other - group home	Secure	HHS/ ORR	Pioneer Human Services	20 (2007)	44 (2007)	Minors only
Seneca County Jail	In use (2007)	Tiffin, Ohio	Prison	Secure	DHS/ ICE	Seneca County Sheriff's Office		162 (2007)	
Shawnee County Department of Corrections	In use (2007)	Topeka, Kansas	Prison	Secure	DHS/ ICE			38 (2007)	
Shawnee County Juvenile	In use (2007)	Topeka, Kansas	Prison - juvenile detention	Secure	DHS/ ICE		70 (2007)		No legal segregation
Sherburne County Jail	In use (2007)	Elk River, Minnesota	Prison	Secure	DHS/ ICE	Sherburne County Sheriff's Department	463 (2007)	195 (2007)	
Silverdale Detention Facility (Silverdale / Hamilton County )	In use (2007)	Chattanooga, Tennessee	Prison	Secure	DHS/ ICE	Corrections Corporation of America	918 (2009)	23 (2007)	Adult males and females
Snake River Juvenile Facility	In use (2007)	Twin Falls, Idaho	Prison - juvenile detention	Secure	DHS/ ICE		27 (2007)		No legal segregation
Snyder County Jail	In use (2007)	Selins Grove, Pennsylvania	Prison	Secure	DHS/ ICE			26 (2007)	
Solon City Jail	In use (2007)	Solon, Ohio	Prison	Secure	DHS/ ICE			18 (2007)	
South Texas Detention Facility (formerly Pearsall Immigration Detention Center)	In use (2009)	Pearsall, Texas	Migrant detention centre	Secure	DHS/ ICE	GEO Group	1,904 (2007)	1,843 (2007)	Gender segregation, age segregation
Southern Ute Detention Center	In use (2007)	Ignacio, Colorado	Prison	Secure	DHS/ ICE	Southern Ute Tribe		22 (2007)	
Southwest Initiatives Group, LLC	In use (2007)	Nixon, Texas	Other	Semi-secure	HHS/ ORR			139 (2007)	Minors only
Southwest Key - El Cajon	In use (2008)	El Cajon, California	Other - Privately run shelter		HHS/ ORR	Southwest Keys		28 (2007)	Minors only
Southwest Key - El Paso (Southwest Key Program-Juvenile)	In use (2008)	El Paso, Texas	Other - shelter	Semi-secure	HHS/ ORR	Southwest Keys	94 (2007)	42 (2007)	Minors only
Southwest Key -Brownsville	In use (2008)	Brownsville, Texas	Other - shelter	Semi-secure	HHS/ ORR	Southwest Keys	48 (2007)		Minors only
Southwest Key -Canutillo	In use (2008)	Canutillo, Texas (near El Paso)	Other - shelter	Semi-secure	HHS/ ORR	Southwest Keys	94 (2007)	98 (2007)	Minors only
Southwest Key -Conroe	In use (2008)	Conroe, Texas	Other - shelter	Semi-secure	HHS/ ORR	Southwest Keys	64 (2007)	64 (2007)	Minors only
Southwest Key -Houston (Southwest Key-Mesa)	In use (2008)	Houston, Texas	Other - shelter	Secure	HHS/ ORR	Southwest Keys	41 (2007)	42 (2007)	Minors only
Southwest Key -Lemon Grove	In use (2008)	Lemon Grove, California	Other - shelter	Semi-secure	HHS/ ORR	Southwest Keys			Minors only
Southwest Key -Phoenix Juvenile Shelter	In use (2008)	Phoenix, Arizona	Other - shelter	Semi-secure	HHS/ ORR	Southwest Keys	128 (2007)	154 (2007)	Minors only
Southwest Key -Pleasant Hill	In use (2008)	Pleasant Hill, California	Other - shelter	Semi-secure	HHS/ ORR	Southwest Keys	24 (2007)		Minors only
Southwest Youth Village (Southwest Indiana Regional Youth Village)	In use (2008)	Vincennes, Indiana	Other - group home and detention centre	Mixed regime	HHS/ ORR	Southwest Indiana Regional Youth Village	188 (2005)	80 (2007)	Gender segregation; legal segregation
Springfield U.S. Medical Center for Federal Prisoners (Springfield Federal Medical Center)	In use (2007)	Springfield, Missouri	Prison - hospital	Secure	DHS/ ICE	Federal Bureau of Prisons		9 (2007)	
St. Clair County	In use (2007)	Port Huron, Michigan	Prison	Secure	DHS/ ICE			14 (2007)	
St. Jerome's Group Home	In use (2007)	Houston, Texas	Other - Group home		DHS/ ICE			4 (2007)	
St. Mary's County Detention Center	In use (2007)	Leonardtown, Maryland	Prison	Secure	DHS/ ICE			2 (2007)	
St. Michael's Home (Catholic Charities)	In use (2008)	Houston, Texas	Other - shelter	Semi-secure	HHS/ ORR	Catholic Charities	72 (2007)	72 (2007)	Minors only
St. X Golden Grove	In use (2007)	St. Croix, U.S. Virgin Islands			DHS/ ICE			1 (2007)	
State Correctional Center Annex Ancho	In use (2007)	Anchorage, Alaska	Prison	Secure	DHS/ ICE	State of Alaska		2 (2007)	
Stewart Detention Center	In use (2009)	Lumpkin, Georgia	Migrant detention centre	Secure	DHS/ ICE	Corrections Corporation of America	1,752 (2009)	1,624 (2007)	Adult males only
Stone Park Police Department	In use (2007)	Stone Park, Illinois	Prison - police lock up	Secure	DHS/ ICE			4 (2007)	
Strafford County Correction	In use (2007)	Dover, New Hampshire	Prison	Secure	DHS/ ICE			14 (2007)	
Suffolk House of Corrections	In use (2008)	Boston, Massachusetts	Prison	Secure	DHS/ ICE	Suffolk County Sheriff's Department	238-272 (2008) (for immigration detainees)	299 (2007)	No legal segregation
Summit County Jail	In use (2007)	Coalville, Utah	Prison	Secure	DHS/ ICE			10 (2007)	
Sussex County Jail	In use (2007)	Sussex, New Jersey	Prison	Secure	DHS/ ICE	Sussex County Sheriff's Office		47 (2007)	
T. Don Hutto Family Residential Facility (Hutto CCA)	In use (2008)	Taylor, Texas	Migrant detention centre	Secure	DHS/ ICE	Corrections Corporation of America	490 (2008)	423 (2007)	Adult females
Tampa Bay Academy	In use (2008)	Riverview, Florida	Other - residential treatment centre	Semi-secure	HHS/ ORR	Tampa Bay Academy		5 (2007)	Minors only
Tensas Parish Detention Center	In use (2007)	Waterproof, Louisiana	Prison	Secure	DHS/ ICE	Emerald Correctional Management	512 (2007)	553 (2007)	
Terre Haute U.S. Penitentiary	In use (2007)	Terre Haute, Indiana	Prison	Secure	DHS/ ICE	Federal Bureau of Prisons		2 (2007)	
Torrance County Detention Facility (Torrance / Estancia, NM)	In use (2008)	Estancia, New Mexico	Prison	Secure	DHS/ ICE	Corrections Corporation of America	910 (2007)	125 (2007)	Adult males and females (2009)
Travis County Jail	In use (2007)	Austin, Texas	Prison	Secure	DHS/ ICE			1 (2007)	
Tri-County Justice and Detention Center (Tri-County Justice & Detention Center; Tri-County Jail)	In use (2009)	Ulin, Illinois	Prison	Secure	DHS/ ICE	GEO Group	226 (2009)	219 (2007)	
Tucson Field Office (Tucson Hold Room)	In use (2007)	Tucson, Arizona	Immigration office	Secure	DHS/ ICE	ICE		122 (2007)	
Tumbleweed Shelter	In use (2008)	Phoenix, Arizona	Other - shelter	Semi-secure	HHS/ ORR	Tumbleweed Center for Youth Development	10 (2007)	9 (2007)	Minors only
Twin Falls County Jail	In use (2007)	Twin Falls, Idaho	Prison	Secure	DHS/ ICE	Twin Falls Sheriff's Office		64 (2007)	
U.S. Catholic Conference of Bishops	In use (2007)	Richmond, Virigina	Other	Semi-secure	HHS/ ORR			1 (2007)	Minors only
U.S. Marshalls Mid. Dist. Florida	In use (2007)	Orlando, Florida	Prison	Secure	DHS/ ICE			2 (2007)	
USP Marion	In use (2007)	Marion, Illinois	Prison	Secure	DHS/ ICE	Bureau of Prisons		1 (2007)	
Utah County Jail	In use (2007)	Spanish Fork, Utah	Prison	Secure	DHS/ ICE			77 (2007)	
Val Verde Correctional Facility and County Jail (Val Verde Detention Center)	In use (2009)	Del Rio, Texas	Prison	Secure	DHS/ ICE	GEO Group	1,451 (2009)	2 (2007)	Adult males and females (2009)
Varick Federal Detention Center (formerly Varick Street Service Processing Center)	In use (2009)	New York City, New York	Migrant detention centre	Secure	DHS/ ICE	Ahtna Technical Services, Inc.	250	79 (2007)	
Ventura Custody Case	In use (2007)	Camarillo, California			DHS/ ICE			55 (2007)	
Vermont Department of Corrections	In use (2007)	Waterbury, Vermont	Prison	Secure	DHS/ ICE	Vermont Department of Corrections		4 (2007)	
Virginia Beach	In use (2007)	Virginia Beach, Virginia			DHS/ ICE			16 (2007)	
Wakulla County Jail	In use (2007)	Crawfordville, Florida	Prison	Secure	DHS/ ICE	Wakulla County Sheriff's Department		169 (2007)	
Washington County Jail	In use (2007)	Fayetteville, Arkansas	Prison	Secure	DHS/ ICE			31 (2007)	
Washington County LEC Juvenile	In use (2007)	Stillwater, Minnesota	Prison - juvenile detention	Secure	DHS/ ICE		10 (2007)		No legal segregation
Washington Field Office	In use (2009)	Fairfax, Virginia	Immigration office	Secure	DHS/ ICE	ICE		1 (2007)	
Washoe County Jail	In use (2007)	Reno, Nevada	Prison	Secure	DHS/ ICE	Washoe County Sheriff's Office		40 (2007)	
Wayne County	In use (2007)	Detroit, Michigan	Prison	Secure	DHS/ ICE			173 (2007)	
Wayne County Jail	In use (2007)	Lyons, New York	Prison	Secure	DHS/ ICE			24 (2007)	
Weber County Jail	In use (2007)	Ogden, Utah	Prison	Secure	DHS/ ICE			79 (2007)	
West Baton Rouge Detention Center	In use (2007)	Port Allen, Louisiana	Prison	Secure	DHS/ ICE			19 (2007)	
West Tennessee Detention Facility	In use (2008)	Mason, Tennessee	Prison	Secure	DHS/ ICE	Corrections Corporation of America	600 (2008)	103 (2007)	Adult males only (2009)
West Texas Detention Facility	In use (2007)	Sierra Blanca, Texas	Prison	Secure	DHS/ ICE	Emerald Correctional Management		84 (2007)	
West Virginia Regional Jail and Corrections	In use (2007)	Charleston, West Virginia	Prison	Secure	DHS/ ICE			21 (2007)	
Westminster Custody	In use (2007)	Westminster, California			DHS/ ICE			168 (2007)	
Wicomico County Detention	In use (2007)	Salisbury, Maryland	Prison	Secure	DHS/ ICE	Wicomico County		125 (2007)	
Willacy Detention Center ( Willacy County Processing Center)	In use (2009)	Raymondville, Texas	Migrant detention centre	Secure	DHS/ ICE	Management and Training Corporation	2,000 (rated capacity 3,086) (2009)	2,124 (2007)	
Williamson County Jail	In use (2007)	Franklin, Tennessee	Prison	Secure	DHS/ ICE			28 (2007)	
Worcester County Jail	In use (2007)	Snow Hill, Maryland	Prison	Secure	DHS/ ICE	Worcester County		74 (2007)	
Wyatt Detention Center	In use (2009)	Central Falls, Rhode Island	Prison	Secure	DHS/ ICE	Central Falls Detention Facility Corporation	642 (2007)	215 (2007)	
Wyoming County Jail	In use (2007)	Warsaw, New York	Prison	Secure	DHS/ ICE	Wyoming County Sheriff's Office		2 (2007)	
Yellowstone County Jail	In use (2007)	Billings, Montana	Prison	Secure	DHS/ ICE			2 (2007)	
Yolo County Juvenile Detention Center	In use (2008)	Woodland, California	Prison - juvenile	Secure	DHS/ ICE		90 (2007)		
York Correctional Institute	In use (2007)	Niantic, Connecticut	Prison	Secure	DHS/ ICE			48 (2007)	
York County Jail	In use (2007)	York, Pennsylvania	Prison	Secure	DHS/ ICE	York County Department of Prisons		762 (2007)	
Youthcare (Casa de los Amigos)	In use (2008)	Seattle, Washington	Other - shelter	Semi-secure	HHS/ ORR	Youthcare	4 (2007)	7 (2007)	Minors only
Yuba County Jail	In use (2007)	Marysville, California	Prison	Secure	DHS/ ICE	Yuba County Sheriff's Department		193 (2007)	
