= HVT =

HVT may refer to:

- Havertys, an American furniture retailer
- Heavyweight
- Hidden-variable theory
- High-value target (also HVI, high-value individual)
- Housing Vermont
- Tikkurila railway station, in Finland
