= VDAP =

VDAP may refer to:

- Vermont Defendant Accommodation Project, a case study aimed at identifying the needs of intellectually disabled criminal defendants
- Volcano Disaster Assistance Program, a program that responds to volcanic crises
