= Northern State Correctional Facility =

Prison in Vermont, United States

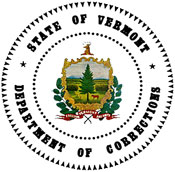
- Interactive map of Northern State Correctional Facility
- Location: 2559 Glen Road, Newport, Orleans County, Vermont, United States; 44.906757°N 72.1905832°W
- Status: Operational
- Security class: Medium
- Capacity: 433
- Population: 417 (FY2010)
- Opened: 1994

The Northern State Correctional Facility (NSCF) is a state prison in the city of Newport, Orleans County, Vermont, United States. It holds up to 433 medium security male prisoners and is the largest prison in Vermont. The Vermont Department of Corrections is responsible for running this prison.

A branch of the Community High School of Vermont is located there. It is accredited by the New England Association of Schools and Colleges. It graduated 13 men in 2007.

In 2008, the budget for the facility was $10 million. The total expenditures for Fiscal Year 2010 were $16,698,753.

In 2013, the superintendent named four gangs prevalent among the prisoners: the Crips, the Bloods, the Aryan Nation, and a local gang, the Chittenden County White Boys. He indicated that Vermont is not violent and the local culture prevails with minimum conflict among the gangs.

== Media ==
In 2011, Muslim inmates complained that their religious needs were not being met during Ramadan. This made national news.
