= Perry County Correctional Facility =

Prison in Alabama, United States

Coordinates: 32°27′04″N 87°26′27″W

- Interactive map of Perry County Correctional Facility
- Location: 4805 Hwy 80 East, Uniontown, Alabama
- Capacity: 738
- Managed by: LCS Corrections Services
- Director: James Mullins

not to be confused with Perry Correctional Institution, Pelzer, South Carolina

Perry County Correctional Facility is a privately owned and privately operated prison facility about four miles (6.4 km) east of Uniontown in Perry County, Alabama, and operated by LCS Corrections Services.

Despite its name the prison has never been operated by, or housed prisoners of, Perry County. It opened in April 2006. A contract with the Vermont Department of Corrections for the housing of 80 offenders ended in April 2009 amid allegations of understaffing and inmates being injured. It was Vermont's first private-prison contract.

On May 25, 2009, prisoners Ashton Mink and Joshua Southwick escaped and were re-captured after a 14-hour shootout in Gladstone, North Dakota. Shortly thereafter Alabama removed its 250 prisoners from the facility, citing money concerns, although state Prison Commissioner Richard Allen noted that LCS had taken eleven and a half hours to notify officials of the Memorial Day escape.

The facility continues to house federal inmates of the U.S. Immigration and Customs Enforcement and the United States Marshals Service. As of November 2013 only about 30 federal prisoners were held in Perry even though the Alabama state system was running at an average 192% capacity.
