= Vermont Treatment Program for Sexual Abusers =

U.S. state criminal rehabilitation program

The Vermont Treatment Program for Sexual Abusers (VTPSA) is charged with teaching offenders make permanent changes in behavior relating to illegal sexual behavior. Recidivism has been about 5%. However, recidivism varies by offense. One critic has stated that the numbers in Vermont are too small and therefore not representative.

== Programs ==
There are three prison-based programs within a framework of 13 community-based sex offender treatment programs. Programs vary in focus, length, and the number of hours of treatment delivered per week. The VTPSA places sex offenders in the programs using two measurements.

1. Classify each sex offender according to his risk for recidivism.
2. Match the level of treatment to the risk level.

The four programs are:

1. High-Intensity Prison Program. (Level B) This program is for offenders convicted of a listed offense who score in the moderate to high range on any one of four actuarial risk assessment instruments and may have prior sexual or violent offense convictions or high levels of criminality. The program was relocated from Northwest State Correctional Facility in St. Albans to Southern State Correctional Facility in Springfield. The program has 45 to 48 beds and is 24 to 36 months long. Offenders are subjected to about eight hours of treatment weekly. The program is staffed on-site by 3 full-time mental health professionals.
2. Moderate-Intensity Prison Program. (Level B) This program is for offenders convicted of a listed offense who score in the moderate to moderate-high range on any one of four actuarial risk assessment instruments and do not have a prior history of sexual or violent offense convictions or high levels of criminality. The program has 27-beds and is located at the Southern State Correctional Facility in Springfield. About 8 beds are for developmentally disabled sex offenders for whom there is a separate program. The program is 12 to 18 months long and offenders get around four hours of treatment per week. The program is staffed on-site by 2 full-time mental health professionals.
3. Low-Intensity Prison Program. (Level A) This program is for offenders convicted of a listed offense who score in the low range on all of the four actuarial risk assessment instruments and do not have a prior history of sexual or violent offense convictions or high levels of criminality. There are 20 beds located at the Southern State Correctional Facility in Springfield. The program is 6 months long and offenders receive about two hours of treatment weekly. The program is staffed on-site by a part-time professional.
4. Female Offender Prison Program. This program is for women convicted of a listed offense who receive a minimum sentence to serve of 8 months or more. The program is located at the Southeast State Correctional Facility in Windsor. The program census ranges from 0 – 5 women at any given time. The program is staffed on-site by a professional on an as needed basis.

Aftercare Community Programs. (Level A or B) This program provides treatment to sex offenders sentenced to probation as well as to offenders returning to the community from prison on supervised release. This program is made up of a statewide network of 13 programs geographically dispersed throughout Vermont. The program delivers one 90 to 120 minute group session per week for approximately 24 months followed by monthly aftercare meetings for 12 months. The program is staffed by mostly masters level mental health professionals. A polygrapher is contracted part-time to conduct approximately 165 polygraph exams a year on sex offenders referred to him by the Vermont Department of Corrections.

== Criticism ==
Michael Jacques completed the Vermont Treatment Program for Sexual Abusers in 2006. After he was released from prison, he sexually assaulted and killed his niece Brooke Bennett. He was arrested in the Brooke Bennett case on June 29, 2008. Jacques had been hailed as a "success story" by probationers. The program has been questioned for this reason.
