= Nicholas J. Deml =

American attorney and politician

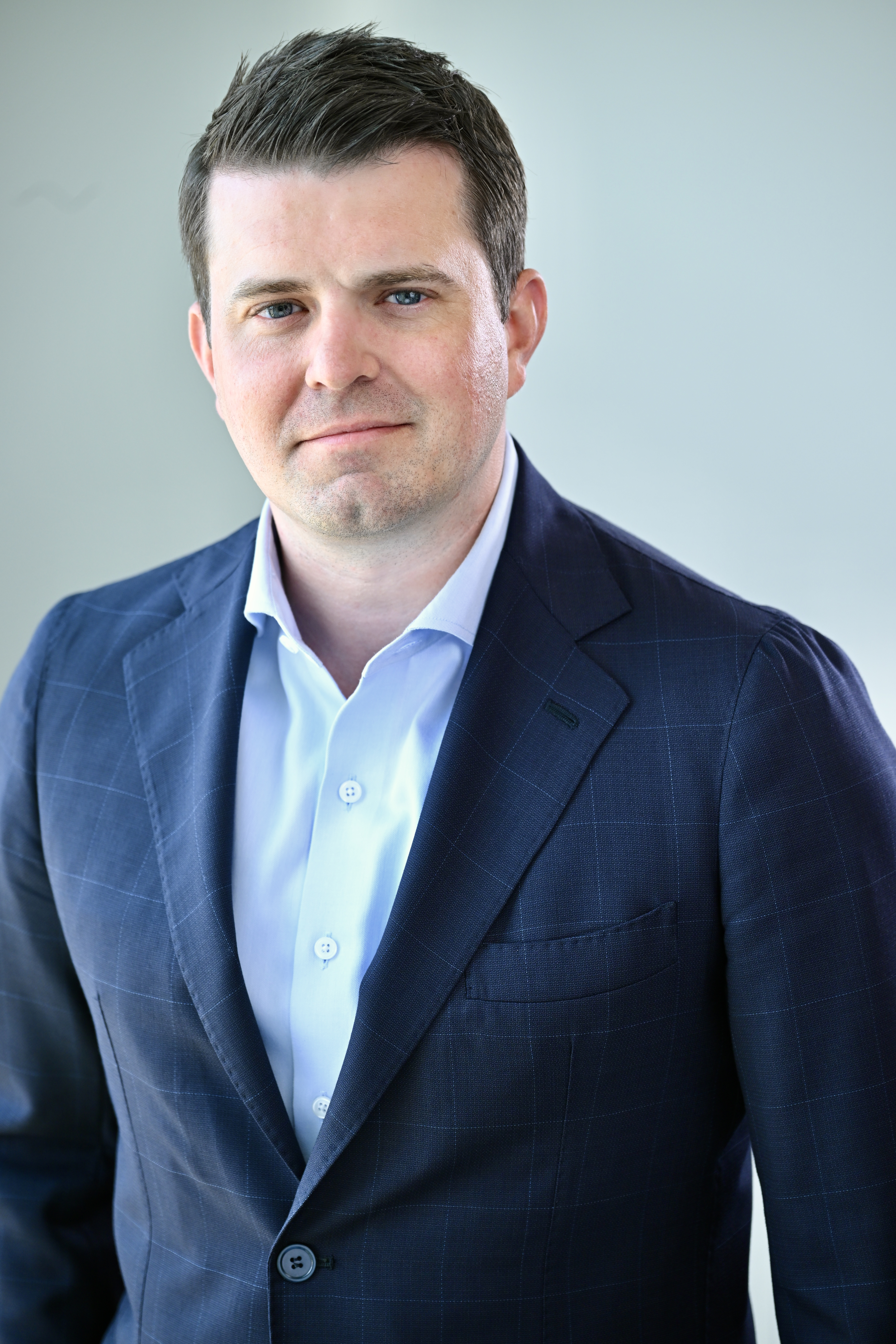
Deml in 2026

Nicholas J. Deml (born May 14, 1987) is an American attorney, former intelligence official, and has served as the Federal receiver overseeing the New York City jail system since January 2026.

Deml previously served as the Commissioner of the Vermont Department of Corrections from November 2021 until August 2025. Deml left the Vermont Department of Corrections to lead the boutique management consulting firm Everly Bly & Co. Deml served as a clandestine intelligence officer in the Directorate of Operations at the Central Intelligence Agency (CIA), and as an aide to U.S. Senate Assistant Majority Leader Dick Durbin and U.S. Senate Committee on the Judiciary.

Deml holds a Juris Doctor (J.D.) degree from Marquette University Law School and a Bachelor of Arts (B.A.) degree in political science from Southern Illinois University. He is a national advocate of corrections reform. He is a member of the Council on Criminal Justice (CCJ). He is also a member of the board of the justice-focused technology non-profit Ameelio. Formerly, Deml served as an executive committee member of the Correctional Leaders Association (CLA), as the Chairman of the CLA Restrictive Housing Committee, and was an advisory board member of the Council of State Governments Justice Center.

In February 2026, Deml was appointed by the Chief Judge of the United States District Court for the Southern District of New York as the Federal Remediation Manager to oversee the reform of the New York City Department of Correction. He submitted the first of a series of Remediation Action Plans in July 2026, outlining for the first time an actionable pathway to resolving decades of constitutional noncompliance.
