= Vermont Woods Studios =

American furniture retailer

- Founded: 2005
- Headquarters: United States

Vermont Woods Studios (VWS) is a retailer of Vermont-manufactured wood furniture, established in 2005 (21 years ago). The company markets and sells products online and from a showroom in Vernon, Vermont.

== Business ==
VWS sells furniture from several independent Vermont woodworking businesses, as well as from larger wholesale companies. The company seeks to promote Vermont's custom furniture industry by unifying marketing efforts for its producers. In a 2014 Vermont Life article, Steve Holman, a furniture maker from Dorset, Vermont, noted that Vermont's isolation from large markets represents a major business challenge, and that small producers rarely have time to manage their online presence adequately. The company sells products under two models: it connects custom furniture makers with customers in exchange for a referral fee, and it directly retails furniture from wholesale producers.

The company was established in 2005 by Peggy Farabaugh and her husband Ken, after Farabaugh lost her position at Tulane University in the aftermath of flooding caused by Hurricane Katrina. Farabaugh drew up the business plan for a $20,000 grant competition; she did not win, but implemented the plan nonetheless. The company took in approximately $800,000 in sales in 2010, and grew by 35% between 2012 and 2014.

The company's Vernon showroom is located in a circa 1790 farmhouse and former ski lodge, and features artworks from Vermont artists. The building's renovation used primarily local materials, and was financed in part through a $100,000 grant from Vermont's Working Lands Enterprise Fund. The showroom features large windows looking out onto a forest, intended to reflect the company's emphasis on using locally sourced wood.

== Social responsibility ==
VWS was a founding member of the Sustainable Furniture Council, whose members seek to minimize the environmental impact of their products. In keeping with Farabaugh's advocacy for rainforest conservation, the company's products are made with wood sourced from Vermont or neighboring states rather than internationally.

Farabaugh has helped to plant trees in Central and South America. In 2016, the company partnered with the Mexican nonprofit Forests for Monarchs for an educational tour of New England encouraging residents to plant milkweed to aid in butterfly conservation.

The company's challenge to its employees to purchase only American-made holiday gifts was the subject of a 2011 segment on ABC's "Made in America" program.

== Lawsuit ==
In 2012, Farabaugh inadvertently used a photograph whose copyright she did not own in the course of a business transaction. In what Mitch Stoltz of the Electronic Frontier Foundation called a "bullying tactic", the copyright owner then sued the company for $150,000 in damages. The lawsuit was dropped, and then refiled, in 2014, and settled out of court in July 2015.
