= Samaritas =

U.S. non-profit organization

Samaritas, formerly Lutheran Social Services of Michigan, is a 501(c)(3) non-profit, human services organization that serves the Lower Peninsula of Michigan with more than 70 programs sites, including adoption, a community center, foster care, family preservation, independent, assisted living and rehabilitation centers for seniors, skilled nursing centers, refugee resettlement and employment services, subsidized housing, and services for the homeless and developmentally disabled. It is the largest faith-based non-profit human service organization and private foster care agency in Michigan. It is also the largest provider of refugee services in Michigan and the fourth largest in the United States.

== History ==
Samaritas has its roots in the congregational outreach efforts of Lutheran immigrants from Germany and Scandinavia who settled in Detroit at the end of the 19th century. In 1909, the Missionsbund (Mission Federation) was formed. In 1934, the Lutheran Inner Mission League of Greater Detroit was incorporated, renamed to The Lutheran Charities the following year. The organization's focus included child welfare, services for the elderly, and a settlement house. The Lutheran Charities merged with a similar group in 1959 and became Lutheran Social Services to offer programs statewide across the Lower Peninsula. Lutheran Social Services began its work in West Michigan in 1965 when it acquired The Lutheran Old Folks Home in downtown Grand Rapids, renamed Luther Home (and MapleCreek in 2007). In 2016, the organization changed its name to Samaritas to encourage people who were not Lutherans to use their services.

== Affiliations ==
Samaritas is a social ministry organization member of Lutheran Services in America and a partner of the Evangelical Lutheran Church in America. Though not owned by the ELCA, Samaritas is governed by a Board of Directors whose members represent parishes in the ELCA's Southeast Michigan Synod and North/West Lower Michigan Synod.

== Services ==
Samaritas assists people in many areas of life. Much of the organization's focus is on family aid, such as assisting with foster care and independent living. Samaritas also helps with settling immigrants, dealing with 17,000 immigrants from 2020 to 2024. Samaritas helps with substance abuse recovery.
