= Vermont statistical areas =

Coordinates: 44.0687°N 72.6658°W

The U.S. State of Vermont currently has eight statistical areas that have been delineated by the Office of Management and Budget (OMB). On July 21, 2023, the OMB delineated two combined statistical areas, one metropolitan statistical area, and five micropolitan statistical areas in Vermont. As of 2025, the largest of these is the Burlington–South Burlington–Barre, VT CSA, comprising the area around Vermont's largest city, Burlington.

== Statistical areas ==
The Office of Management and Budget (OMB) has designated more than 1,000 statistical areas for the United States and Puerto Rico. These statistical areas are important geographic delineations of population clusters used by the OMB, the United States Census Bureau, planning organizations, and federal, state, and local government entities.

The OMB defines a core-based statistical area (commonly referred to as a CBSA) as the county or counties (or county-equivalents) surrounding at least one densely-settled core of at least 10,000 population, "plus adjacent counties having a high degree of social and economic integration with the core as measured through commuting ties with the counties containing the core". The OMB further divides core-based statistical areas based on population into metropolitan statistical areas (MSAs) for those with at least 50,000 and micropolitan statistical areas (μSAs) for those with 10,000 to 49,999 people.

The OMB defines a combined statistical area (CSA) as two or more adjacent core-based statistical areas where the employment interchange rate (% commuting from A to B plus % commuting from B to A) is at least 15%. The primary statistical areas (PSAs) include all combined statistical areas and any core-based statistical area that is not a constituent of a combined statistical area.

The eight United States statistical areas and 14 counties of the State of Vermont (Note: An out-of-state area and its population are displayed in green. An area that extends into more than one state is displayed in purple. A purple population number over a black population number show the total population versus the in-state population. The state's abbreviation is also shown next to the in-state total.)
Combined statistical area	2025 population (est.)	Core-based statistical area	2025 population (est.)	County	2025 population (est.)
Burlington–South Burlington–Barre, VT CSA	287,455	Burlington–South Burlington, VT MSA	227,803	Chittenden County, Vermont	169,115
Burlington–South Burlington–Barre, VT CSA	287,455	Burlington–South Burlington, VT MSA	227,803	Franklin County, Vermont	51,177
Burlington–South Burlington–Barre, VT CSA	287,455	Burlington–South Burlington, VT MSA	227,803	Grand Isle County, Vermont	7,511
Burlington–South Burlington–Barre, VT CSA	287,455	Barre, VT μSA	59,652	Washington County, Vermont	59,652
none		Lebanon–Claremont, NH-VT μSA	224,500; 87,314 (VT)	Grafton County, New Hampshire	93,225
none		Lebanon–Claremont, NH-VT μSA	224,500; 87,314 (VT)	Windsor County, Vermont	57,312
none		Lebanon–Claremont, NH-VT μSA	224,500; 87,314 (VT)	Sullivan County, New Hampshire	43,961
none		Lebanon–Claremont, NH-VT μSA	224,500; 87,314 (VT)	Orange County, Vermont	30,002
none		Rutland, VT μSA	59,653	Rutland County, Vermont	59,653
Keene–Brattleboro, NH-VT CSA	123,473; 45,204 (VT)	Keene, NH μSA	78,269	Cheshire County, New Hampshire	78,269
Keene–Brattleboro, NH-VT CSA	123,473; 45,204 (VT)	Brattleboro, VT μSA	45,204	Windham County, Vermont	45,204
none		Bennington, VT μSA	36,630	Bennington County, Vermont	36,630
none		none		Addison County, Vermont	38,048
none		none		Caledonia County, Vermont	30,414
none		none		Orleans County, Vermont	27,600
none		none		Lamoille County, Vermont	26,294
none		none		Essex County, Vermont	6,051
State of Vermont					644,663

The six core-based statistical areas of the State of Vermont (Note: For CBSAs comprising populations from multiple states, they are listed twice to show both their intrastate population within that CBSA as well as the CBSA's total population. Only the intrastate population is ranked.)
2025 rank	Core-based statistical area	Population				
2025 rank	Core-based statistical area	2025 estimate	Change	2020 Census	Change	2010 Census
1	Burlington–South Burlington, VT MSA	227,803	+0.99%	225,562	+6.77%	211,261
2	Lebanon–Claremont, NH-VT μSA (VT)	87,314	+0.33%	87,030	+1.66%	85,606
3	Rutland, VT μSA	59,653	−1.52%	60,572	−1.74%	61,642
4	Barre, VT μSA	59,652	−0.26%	59,807	+0.46%	59,534
5	Brattleboro, VT μSA	45,204	−1.53%	45,905	+3.13%	44,513
6	Bennington, VT μSA	36,630	−1.92%	37,347	+0.60%	37,125
	Lebanon–Claremont, NH-VT μSA	224,500	+1.45%	221,294	+1.29%	218,466

The two combined statistical areas of the State of Vermont (Note: For CSAs comprising populations from multiple states, they are listed twice to show both their intrastate population within that CSA as well as the CSA's total population. Only the intrastate population is ranked.)
2025 rank	Combined statistical area	Population				
2025 rank	Combined statistical area	2025 estimate	Change	2020 Census	Change	2010 Census
1	Burlington–South Burlington-Barre, VT CSA	287,455	+0.73%	285,369	+5.38%	270,795
2	Keene–Brattleboro, NH-VT CSA (VT)	45,204	−1.53%	45,905	+3.13%	44,513
	Keene–Brattleboro, NH-VT CSA	123,473	+0.91%	122,363	+0.60%	121,630

== See also ==
- Geography of Vermont
  - Demographics of Vermont
