= Williamson County Jail =

- U.S. National Register of Historic Places
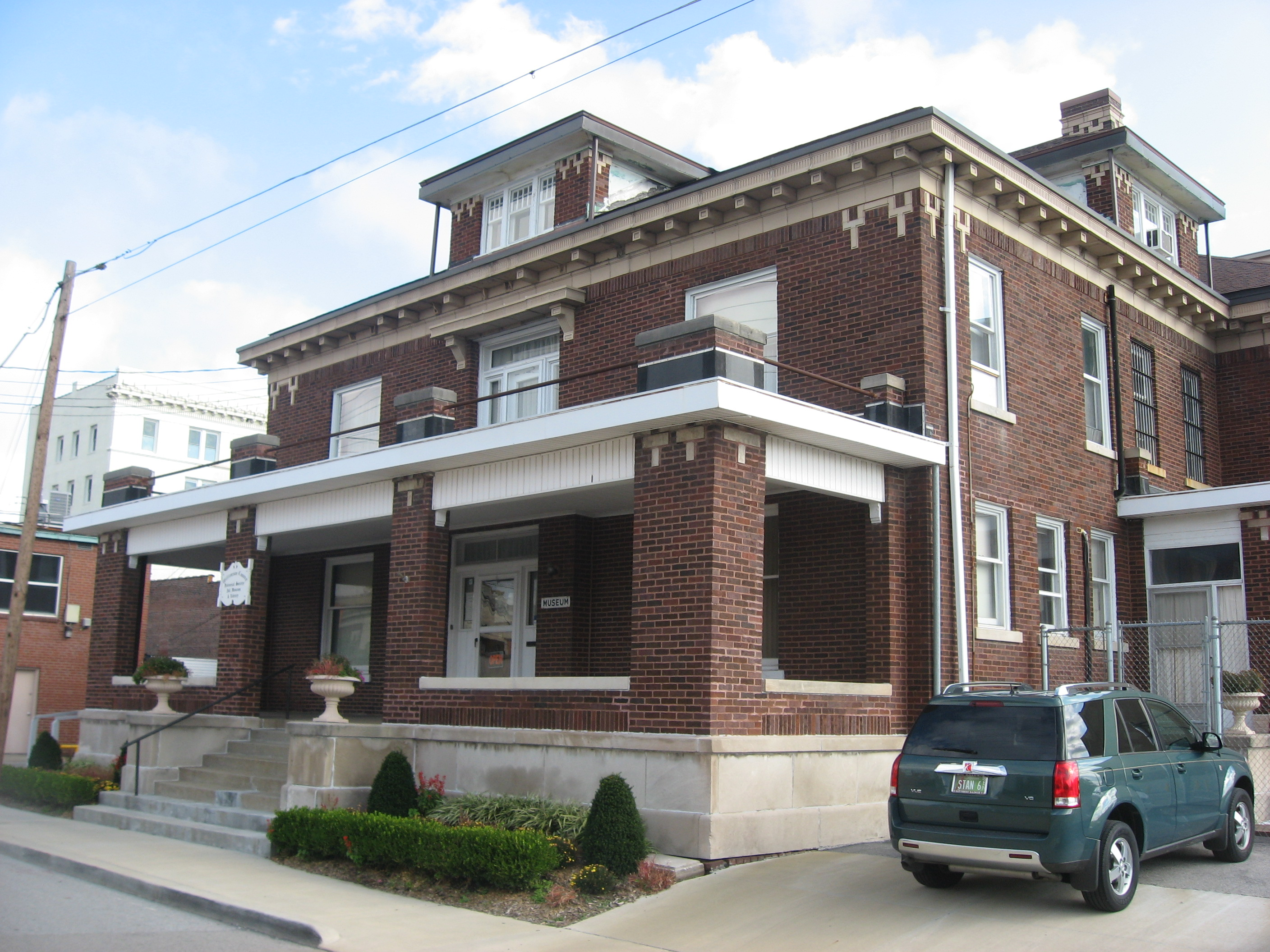

- Location within Illinois Location within the United States
- Location: 105 S. Van Buren St., Marion, Illinois
- Coordinates: 37°43′50″N 88°55′41″W
- Area: less than one acre
- Built: 1913
- Built by: Fuller and Pulley
- Architect: Spencer, N.S. and Temple
- Architectural style: Prairie School
- NRHP reference No.: 07000476
- Added to NRHP: May 30, 2007

The Williamson County Jail, located at 105 S. Van Buren St. in Marion, is the former county jail serving Williamson County, Illinois. The Prairie School building served as the county jail from 1913 to 1971. The jail housed prisoners involved with three violent conflicts in the 1920s: the Herrin massacre, the Klan War, and a gang rivalry between the Shelton Brothers Gang and Charles Birger's gang. The building is now a history museum and is listed on the National Register of Historic Places.

== History ==
The jail was built in 1913 to replace the county's previous jail, which suffered from flooding, overcrowding, and poor living conditions. It soon played a central role in a number of conflicts which engulfed Williamson County in the 1920s, giving the county the nickname "Bloody Williamson". In 1922, the jail housed the men arrested for their role in the Herrin massacre, a deadly riot between union and non-union coal miners. Of the 125 men originally indicted after the massacre, only five were tried before their release; a pro-union jury found these five men not guilty of murder. The riot and trial brought national attention to the county, leading President Warren Harding to refer to the massacre as "shocking", "shameful", and "butchery". A grand jury later indicted 214 defendants, eight of whom were held without bail at the jail; these men were provided with meals and entertainment by union supporters during their time at the jail.

Later in the 1920s, the jail became part of another conflict when the Ku Klux Klan assumed control of the Marion Law Enforcement League and hired S. Glenn Young to conduct violent raids on bootleggers. Young's actions were divisive and sparked violence among Williamson County residents in a conflict which became known as the Klan War. The conflict escalated until state troopers were called to the jail to stabilize the county and protect the prisoners from lynch mobs. The war ended when Young and Deputy Sheriff Ora Thomas killed each other in a shootout.

The jail played a role in yet another conflict in the 1920s when a gang war arose between the Shelton Brothers Gang and Charles Birger's gang. The gangs, led by rival bootleggers, became notorious for exchanging murders. The majority of the members of both gangs spent time in the Williamson County Jail; fourteen members of the Shelton Brothers received life sentences for murder, and Rado Millich of Birger's gang became the last man to be hanged in Williamson County in 1927. Birger only spent a single night in the jail; after being arrested for murder, he was released after claiming he acted in self-defense, a claim which kept him out of the jail on two other occasions as well.

The jail closed in 1971, and it was added to the National Register of Historic Places on May 30, 2007.

== Williamson County Museum ==
The building is now owned by the Williamson County Illinois Historical Society and operated as the Williamson County Museum. Several rooms have been restored to a Victorian-era period, and other rooms feature historic small businesses, military and clothing displays, a schoolroom and the original jail cells. There is also a genealogical and historical research library.

== Architecture ==
The architectural firm of N. S. Spencer and Temple designed the building in the Prairie School style. The three-story building was built with brick and stone. The building's design features an emphasis on horizontal lines, a low roof with an overhanging cornice, and an art glass transom and sidelights around the front entrance, all characteristic Prairie School elements. The jail was capable of housing 87 inmates, including 81 men and 6 women. The building also included the county sheriff's residence, which was separated from the jail by 13 inches (330 mm) of concrete and two steel doors. A verandah over the jail's front porch was accessible from the sheriff's residence; the verandah was also used by armed guards during the Klan War.
