= List of law enforcement agencies in Vermont =

This is a list of law enforcement agencies in the state of Vermont.

According to the US Bureau of Justice Statistics' 2008 Census of State and Local Law Enforcement Agencies, the state had 69 law enforcement agencies employing 1,103 sworn police officers, about 178 for each 100,000 residents.

== State agencies ==
- Vermont Capitol Police
- Vermont Department of Public Safety
  - Vermont State Police
- Vermont Fish and Wildlife Department
  - Division of Warden Service
- Vermont Department of Corrections
- Vermont Department of Liquor and Lottery
  - Division of Liquor Control
- Vermont Secretary of State
  - Office of Professional Regulation
    - Investigative Unit
- Vermont Department of Motor Vehicles
  - Vermont Highway Patrol
- Office of the Vermont Attorney General

== County agencies ==
- Addison County Sheriff's Office
- Bennington County Sheriff's Department
- Caledonia County Sheriff's Office
- Chittenden County Sheriff's Department
- Essex County Sheriff's Office
- Franklin County Sheriff's Department
- Grand Isle County Sheriff's Office
- Lamoille County Sheriff's Department
- Orange County Sheriff's Department
- Orleans County Sheriff's Office
- Rutland County Sheriff's Office
- Washington County Sheriff's Office
- Windham County Sheriff's Department
- Windsor County Sheriff's Department

== Municipal agencies ==
- Barre Police Department (City of Barre)
- Barre Police Department (Town of Barre)
- Bellows Falls Police Department
- Bennington Police Department
- Berlin Police Department
- Bradford Police Department
- Brandon Police Department
- Brattleboro Police Department
- Bristol Police Department
- Burlington Police Department
- Castleton Police Department
- Chester Police Department
- Colchester Police Department
- Dover Police Department
- Essex Police Department
- Enosburgh Police Department
- Fairlee Police Department
- Fair Haven Police Department
- Hardwick Police Department
- Hartford Police Department
- Hinesburg Police Department
- Killington Police Department
- Ludlow Police Department
- Lyndonville Police Department
- Manchester Police Department (Town of Manchester)
- Middlebury Police Department
- Milton Police Department
- Morristown Police Department
- Montpelier Police Department
- Newport Police Department (City of Newport)
- Northfield Police Department
- Norwich Police Department
- Pittsford Police Department
- Randolph Police Department
- Richmond Police Department
- Royalton Police Department
- Rutland Police Department (City of Rutland)
- Rutland Police Department (Town of Rutland)
- Shelburne Police Department
- South Burlington Police Department
- Springfield Police Department
- St. Albans Police Department (City of St. Albans)
- St. Johnsbury Police Department
- Stowe Police Department
- Swanton Police Department (Village of Swanton)
- Thetford Police Department
- Vergennes Police Department
- Williston Police Department
- Wilmington Police Department
- Windsor Police Department
- Winhall Police Department
- Winooski Police Department
- Weathersfield Police Department
- Woodstock Police Department

== College police ==
- University of Vermont Police
