= Wind power in Vermont =

Electricity from wind in one U.S. state

Wind power projects in Vermont
Operating
Proposed

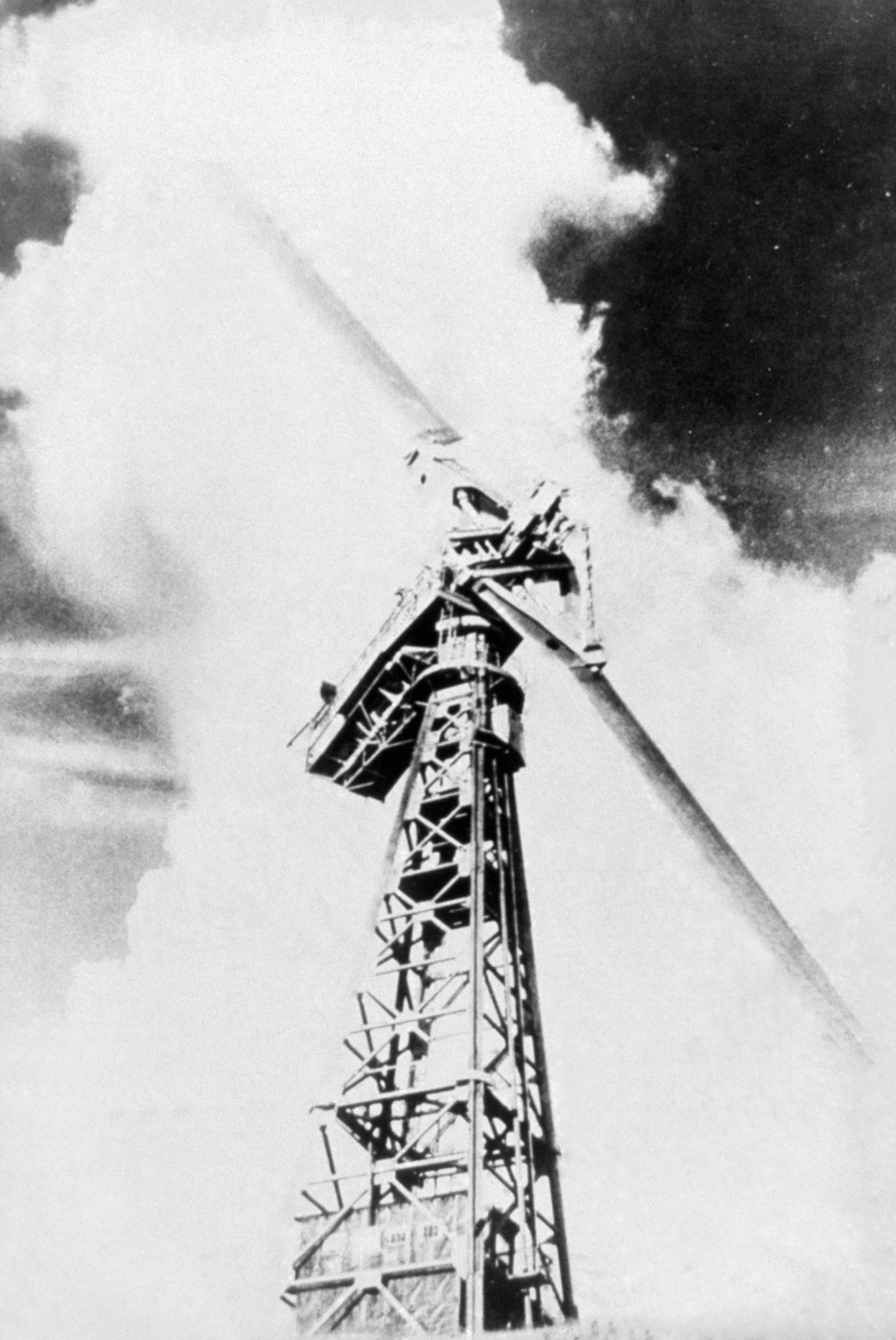
1941 wind turbine on Grandpa's Knob

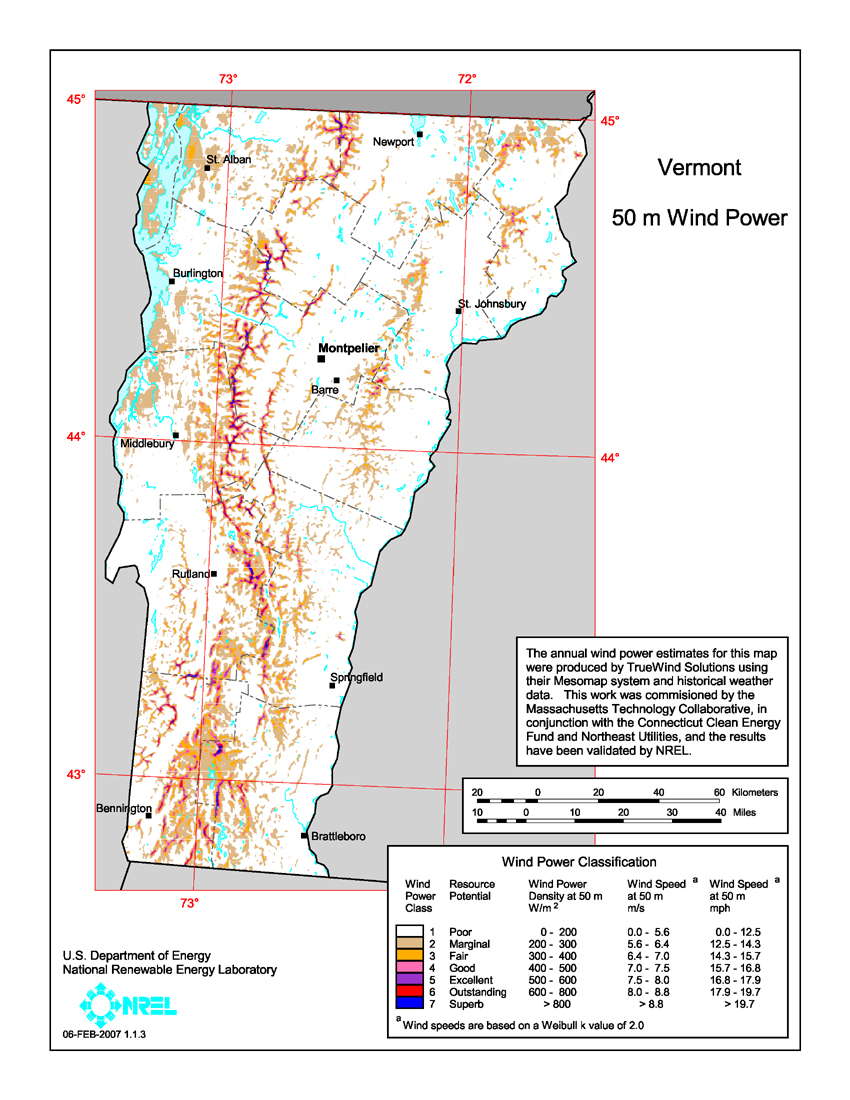
Vermont wind resources

In 2021, Wind power in Vermont consists of five utility-scale wind farms with a total capacity of 149 megawatts (MW). They were responsible for one-sixth of in-state electricity generation in 2019.

No other wind farms were in the pipeline as of January 2020.

The first megawatt turbine in the world was installed in Vermont, at Grandpa's Knob in 1941.

== Wind farms ==
Name	Capacity (MW)	Location (county)	Status
Deerfield	30	Bennington County	Operating
Georgia Mountain	10	Chittenden County; Franklin County	Operating
Kingdom Community	63	Orleans County	Operating
Searsburg	6	Bennington County	Operating
Sheffield	40	Caledonia County	Operating
Total:	149		

The 6 MW Searsburg Wind Farm has operated since 1997. The 550-kilowatt turbines provide enough electricity to meet the needs of 1,600 average Vermont households.

Sheffield Wind Farm is a 40 MW wind farm operating in Sheffield, originally developed by First Wind and currently owned by TerraForm Power.

The 63 MW Kingdom Community Wind Farm is operational on Lowell Mountains ridge in Lowell, owned by Green Mountain Power (GMP) and Vermont Electric Co-op (VEC). Costing $156 million, the 21-turbine project began construction in September 2011, with completion expected by the end of 2012.

Georgia Mountain Community Wind Project is a 4-turbine, 10-megawatt wind project on Georgia Mountain in the towns of Georgia and Milton. It is owned by a Vermont family and the power is being sold to the Burlington Electric Department. It was completed in December 2012. The project's four turbines will provide enough electricity to meet the needs of 4,200 average Vermont households.

== Small wind turbines ==
Several 100 kW wind turbines manufactured by a Vermont company have been installed or planned at locations in the state, including Heritage Aviation, Bolton Ski Area, Dynapower, Rock of Ages, Burke Mountain, and the Lake Champlain Ferry at South Hero. Smaller wind turbines for residential use are also located throughout Vermont.

== Generation ==
Total wind generation by year
Year	GWh
2001	12.1
2002	10.3
2003	10.8
2004	11.3
2005	11.5
2006	10.7
2007	10.5
2008	10.2
2009	11.6
2010	13.9
2011	33.2
2012	106.9
2013	236
2014	311.3
2015	325.3
2016	291.2
2017	305.4
2018	373.3
2019	384

Vermont wind generation capacity by year
Megawatts of wind capacity

== Proposals ==
The 30 MW Deerfield Wind Project is a proposed wind farm set to be located in Searsburg and Readsboro, and to include 15 turbines. It is estimated to provide enough electricity to meet the needs of 13,000 average Vermont households. It will create approximately 250 jobs during its construction, and nine when it starts operating. It is expected to contribute $10 million in state education fund revenues over its 20-year life.

== See also ==
- Solar power in Vermont
- Smith–Putnam wind turbine
- Wind power in the United States
- Renewable energy in the United States
