= Solar power in Vermont =

Overview of solar power in the U.S. state of Vermont

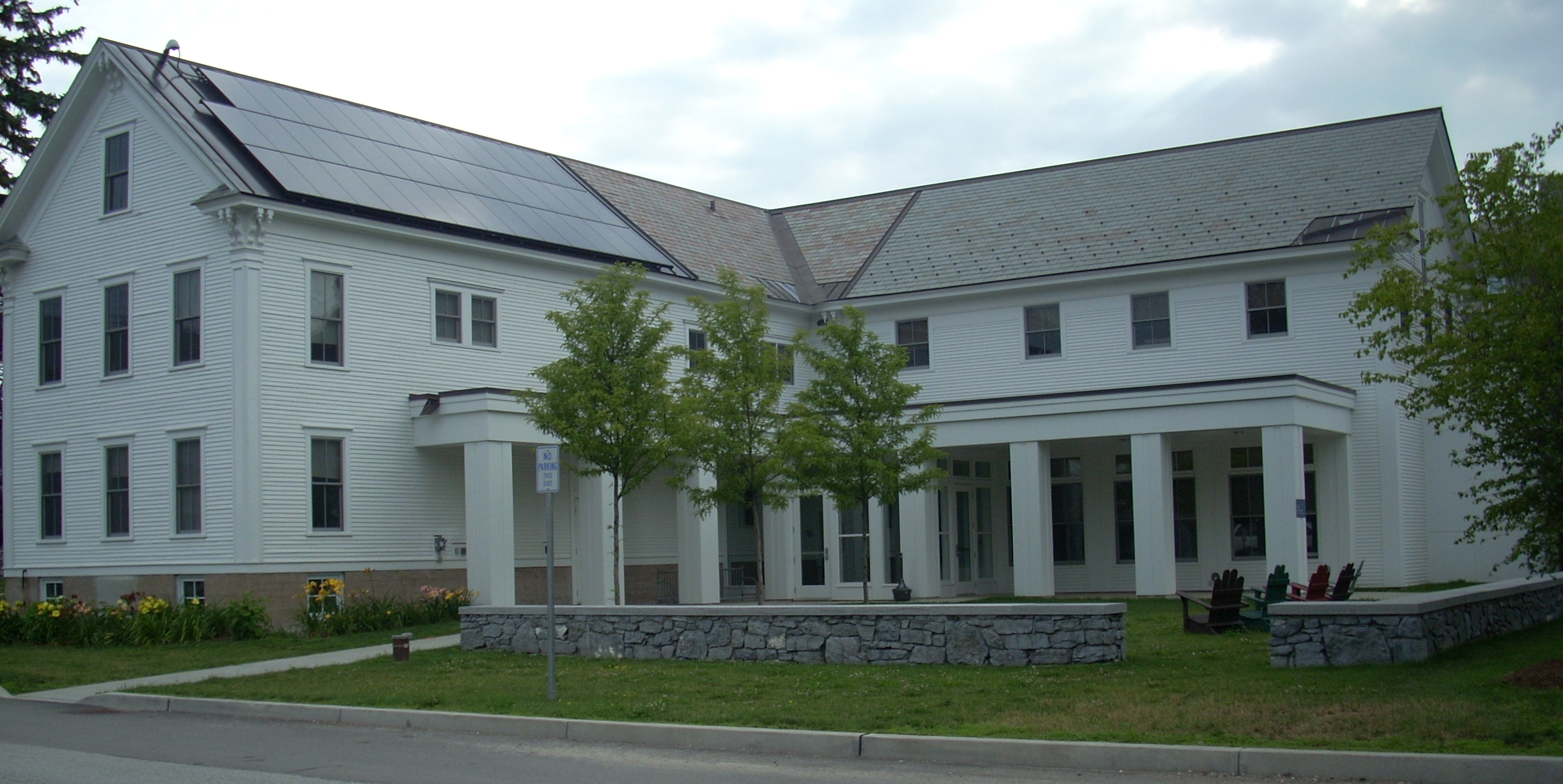
Solar panels at Middlebury College

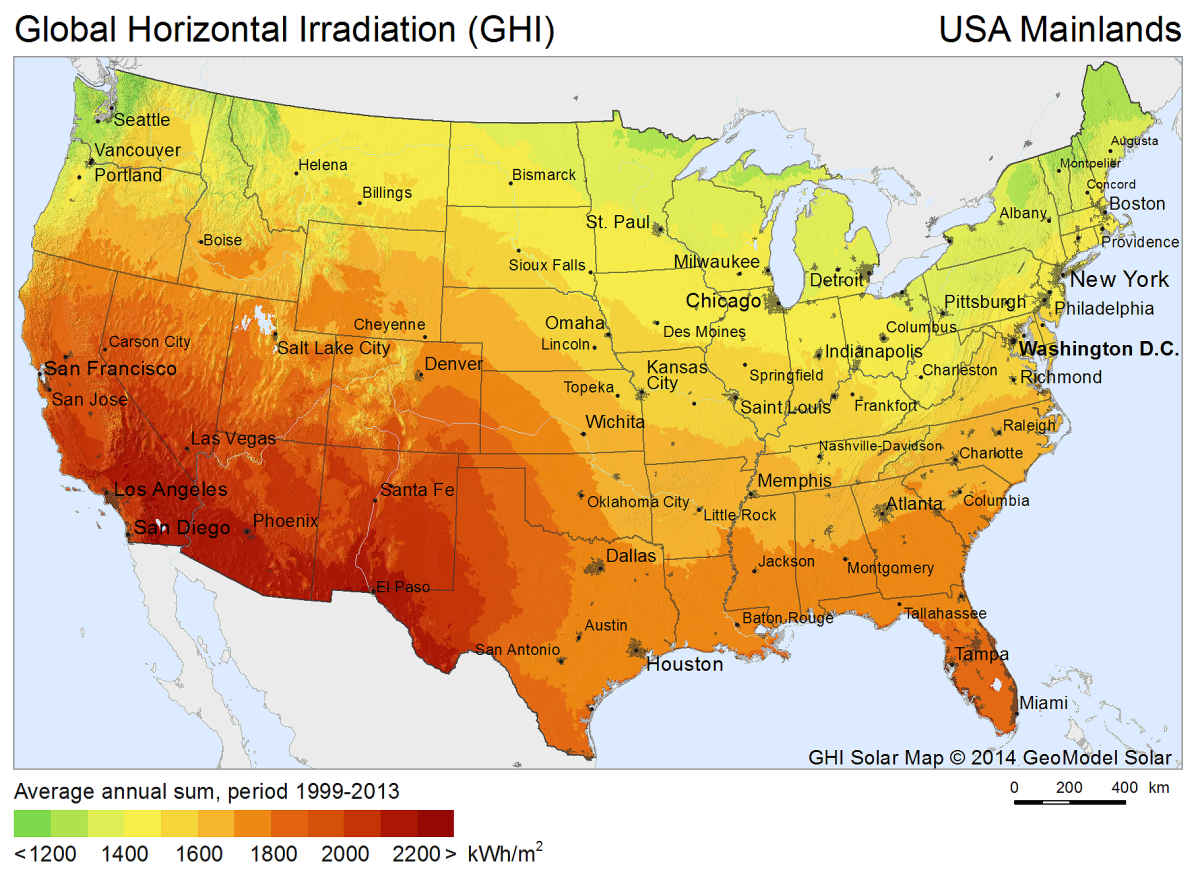
U.S. solar potential

Solar power in the U.S. state of Vermont provides almost 8% of the state's in-state electricity production as of 2025. A 2009 study indicated that distributed solar on rooftops can provide 18% of all electricity used in Vermont. A 2012 estimate suggests that a typical 5 kW system costing $25,000 before credits and utility savings will pay for itself in 10 years, and generate a profit of $34,956 over the rest of its 25-year life.

Net metering is available for up to at least 500 kW generation, but is capped at 15% of utilities peak demand. Excess generation is rolled over each month but is lost once each year. Group net metering is also allowed. Vermont is given an A for net metering and a C for interconnection. A feed-in tariff was created in 2009, but is limited to 50 MW and is fully subscribed. The cap has increased by 5 to 10 MW/year from 2013 until 2022, and the cap went up to 127.5 MW. It is available for solar, wind, methane, and biomass. Seven solar projects are receiving payments, of $0.30/kWh, for 25 years.

== Installed capacity ==
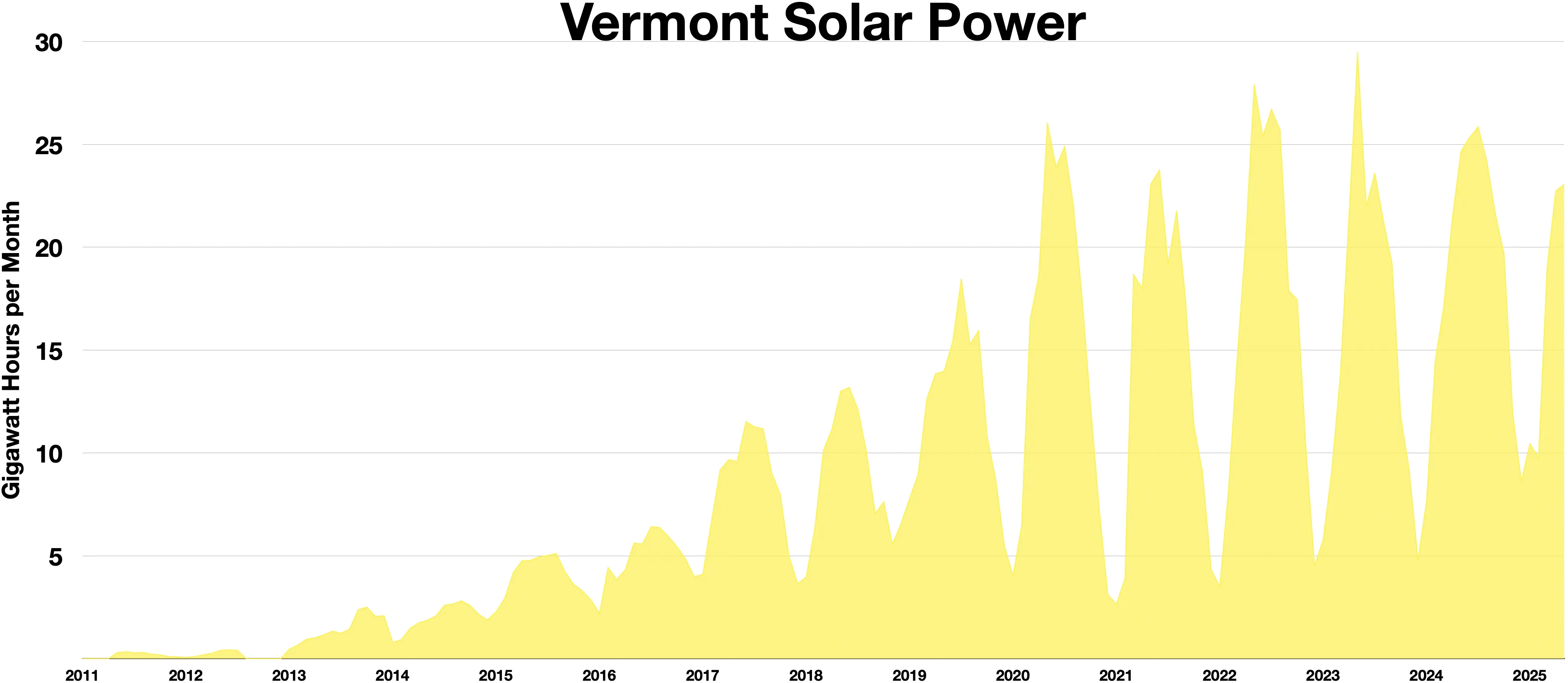
Vermont solar power

Grid-connected PV capacity (MW)
| Year | Capacity | Change | % change |
|---|---|---|---|
| 2007 | 0.7 | 0.2 | 40% |
| 2008 | 1.1 | 0.4 | 57% |
| 2009 | 1.7 | 0.6 | 55% |
| 2010 | 3.9 | 2.2 | 129% |
| 2011 | 11.7 | 7.8 | 200% |
| 2012 | 28.0 | 16.3 | 139% |
| 2013 | 41.5 | 13.6 | 49% |
| 2014 | 64 | 22.5 | 54% |
| 2015 | 107 | 43 | 67% |
| 2016 | 185 | 78 | 73% |
| 2017 | 220 | 35 | 19% |
| 2018 | 302 | 82 | 37% |
| 2019 | 355 | 53 | 18% |
| 2020 | 379 | 24 | 7% |
| 2021 | 397.6 | 18.6 | 4.9% |
| 2022 | 417 | 19.4 | 4.8% |

== Solar farms ==
Source: NREL

In 2012, Vermont had five solar arrays of at least 1 MW, the 2.2 MW SunGen Sharon 1 in Sharon. the 2.1 MW concentrating photovoltaics array installed in July 2011 in South Burlington, the 1.5 MW photovoltaic array also in South Burlington installed in October 2011, the 1 MW photovoltaic array in Ferrisburgh, and the 2 MW Williamstown Solar Project.

As of 2019, Green Mountain Power (GMP) has further constructed 417 MW or solar projects (in service) as of the end of 2023. In 2015, the 20 MW Coolidge solar farm near Ludlow was opposed by GMP, which claimed that there was no need for such utility-scale solar in the state. The farm was completed by NextEra Energy at the end of 2018.

== Generation ==
Using data available from the U.S. Energy Information Agency's Electric Power Annual 2017 and "Electric Power Monthly Data Browser", the following table summarizes Vermonts’s solar energy posture.

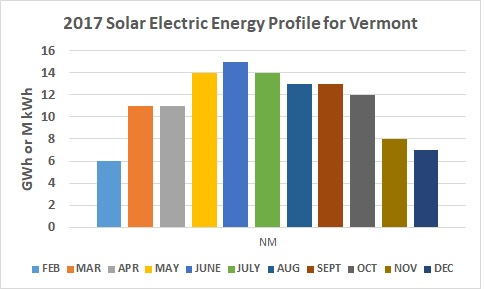
2017 Vermont solar energy generation profile

Solar-electric generation in Vermont
| Year | Facilities | Summer capacity (MW) | Electric energy (GWh or M kWh) | Capacity factor | Yearly growth of generating capacity | Yearly growth of produced energy | % of VT renewable electric energy | % of VT generated electric energy | % of U.S. solar electric energy |
|---|---|---|---|---|---|---|---|---|---|
| 2018 | 34 | 98.7 | 143 | 0.165 | 33% | 44.4% | 6.09% | 6.07% | 0.27% |
| 2017 | 31 | 74.2 | 99 | 0.152 | 13% | 67.8% | 4.64% | 4.62% | 0.19% |
| 2016 | | 65.7 | 59 | 0.103 | 118% | 23% | 3.10% | 3.08% | 0.16% |
| 2015 | | 32.4 | 48 | 0.169 | 7% | 100% | 2.4% | 2.42% | 0.19% |
| 2014 | | 30.2 | 24 | .091 | | 41% | 2.10% | 0.34% | 0.13% |

Capacity factor for each year was computed from the end-of-year summer capacity. 2017 data is from Electric Power Monthly and is subject to change.

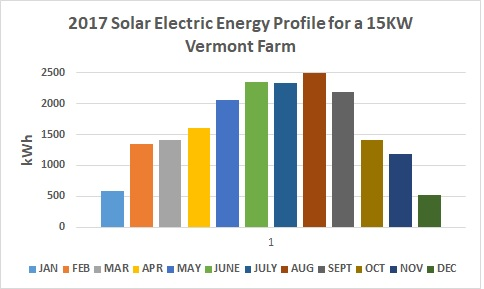
2017 15KW Vermont farm solar energy generation profile

A small-scale 15KW installation at a homestead in middle Vermont generated 19,480 kWh of electrical energy at a capacity factor of 0.15. The homestead was sending energy to the utility when it was produced, and taking energy from the utility when needed. Overall, the homestead consumed 80% of its generation and sold the remaining 20% to the utility. The generation profile is shown in the chart.

Beginning with the 2014 data year, the Energy Information Administration (EIA) has estimated the distributed solar-photovoltaic generation and distributed solar-photovoltaic capacity. These non-utility-scale appraisals evaluate that Vermont generated the following amounts of additional solar energy:

Estimated distributed solar electric generation in Vermont
| Year | Summer capacity (MW) | Electric energy (GWh or M kWh) |
|---|---|---|
| 2018 | 102.3 | 130 |
| 2017 | 90.3 | 111 |
| 2016 | 59.8 | 76 |
| 2015 | 49.9 | 48 |
| 2014 | 27.9 | 33 |

== See also ==
- Wind power in Vermont
- Solar power in the United States
- Renewable energy in the United States
