= Douglas County Correctional Center =

County jail in Omaha, Nebraska

- Interactive map of Douglas County Correctional Center
- Location: Omaha, Nebraska; 41.2534°N 95.9384°W
- Opened: July 1979
- Managed by: Douglas County Department of Corrections

Douglas County Correctional Center (DCCC) is a jail in Omaha, Nebraska. The jail is the largest in the Midwest and is operated by the Douglas County Department of Corrections. The jail is used to house inmates in criminal or immigration related offenses. The jail is located at 710 S. 17th St, Omaha, Nebraska.

== Timeline ==
Douglas County Correctional Center was opened in July 1979. It was designed with 12 housing units that held a total of 200 single bed cells.

By 1983, the majority of the single cells were double bunked to bring the capacity to 363 beds.

In April 1989, the annex was added to the Correctional Center. Eight dormitory style housing units were added with 354 beds and 2 isolation cells. This brought the capacity to 719 beds.

In June 2005, construction of the Correctional Center was completed, adding nine housing units with 62 beds each and a medical housing unit that can accommodate a combination of 61 male and female inmates. This brings total capacity to 1,453 beds.

== See also ==
- List of Nebraska state prisons
