= 1860 Vermont elections =

The Vermont Election in 1860 consisted of elections for federal, state, and local elections. All state offices were for two years. All terms expired in 1862. Elections included the gubernatorial, all state offices, including all state senators and representatives, the federal Congress and the presidential.

Seats were distributed two state senate seats per county; 1 state lower house seat per town or city.

Voters elected 29 Republicans to the state senate and 1 Democrat. They elected 211 Republicans to the lower house; 25 Democrats.
