= Vermont Housing Finance Agency =

American private non-profit agency

Coordinates: 44.474985°N 73.213609°W

- Company type: Non-Profit
- Industry: Affordable housing
- Founded: 1974 (Vermont)
- Headquarters: Vermont
- Area served: Vermont
- Key people: Maura Collins
- Products: Affordable housing
- Website: www.vhfa.org

The Vermont Housing Finance Agency (VHFA) is chartered as a private non-profit agency to finance and promote affordable housing opportunities for low- and moderate- income Vermonters. They are located in Burlington, Vermont.

== History ==
The Vermont legislature established the agency in 1974.

By 2018, the VHFA had assisted approximately 29,000 people to purchase primary residences; and provided financing, development and management support, subsidy administration and tax credits for about 13,650 units of multifamily rental housing.

== Operations ==
The board of directors has five members whom the Governor of Vermont appoints. There are also four "ex officio" members representing the finance and construction industry who also vote. The Executive Director is Maura Collins.

VHFA helps applicants with

- Single-family and homeownership mortgage financing programs
- Multifamily programs including:
  - Multifamily loan programs
  - Asset management and monitoring
  - Housing Assistance Payments contract administration
  - Federal and state Housing Tax Credit programs

VHFA reports housing data to responsible government agencies.

=== Financial ===
Since 1974, the agency has issued $2.96 billion worth of bonds and other financial instruments, of which $783.9 million was still outstanding at the end of the fiscal year ending June 30, 2010. Operating expenses were $4.6 million out of which $3.0 million were for personnel salaries and benefits.

=== Staffing ===
VHFA has about 40 employees. it issues tax-exempt bonds to fund its loan programs. It supports its operation out of the difference between what it gets for interest from its debtors and what it gets from lenders. The bonds are obligations of the agency and are underwritten by its loans.
