= Housing Vermont =

American not-for-profit syndication and development company

- Company type: Non-Profit
- Industry: Affordable housing
- Founded: 1988
- Headquarters: Vermont, United States
- Area served: Vermont
- Key people: Andrew Broderick
- Products: Affordable housing
- Website: http://www.hvt.org/home

Housing Vermont is a not-for-profit syndication and development company founded in 1988. It creates rental housing intended to be permanent and affordable for Vermonters through partnerships with local organizations, public agencies and the private sector. It has produced more than 4,000 apartments in 131 different developments. It is headquartered in Burlington, Vermont.

It is Vermont’s largest developer of affordable housing.

== History ==
In 2009, it employed 100 people.

== Funding ==
As of 2008, it had raised $163 million for its projects.

In 2003, Housing Vermont formed the Green Mountain Housing Equity Fund with a total investment of $14 million from nine investors. The Fund’s dollars were spread out over nine projects and it provided an internal rate of return of 7.75%. This allowed the agency to finance projects in which it was not the co-developer.

Green Mountain Housing Equity Fund II was created in 2005 with total capital of $22 million. In all, commitments were made to seven developments, which created 232 new homes.

The agency's third offering closed in 2007 with a total investment of $25 million.

== Organization ==
It has 16 managers for its properties, including the Vermont State Housing Authority. There are developments in all of Vermont's 14 counties.

It is managed by an 11-member board of directors. It has a staff of 21. It has a budget of nearly $3 million.

Key people include:

- President - Andrew Broderick. Salary - $102,700
- Vice President - Kathleen Cannon. Salary - $88,000.
- Vice President - Kenn Sassorossi. Salary - $80,100
- Vice President - Nancy Owens. Salary - $65,603.
