= Vermont Defendant Accommodation Project =

Project identifying needs of intellectually disabled criminal defendants

The Vermont Defendant Accommodation Project ("VDAP") was a two-year case study conducted by Philip J. Kinsler, Anna Saxman, and Daniel B. Fishman aimed at identifying, assessing, and accommodating the special needs of intellectually disabled criminal defendants.

== Background ==
The VDAP was originally conducted to understand the difficulty intellectually disabled criminal defendants have navigating the criminal justice system. During the study, however, the authors found that intellectually disabled criminal defendants often have a combination of disorders, such as:

- mental illness
- substance abuse
- homelessness
- a history of physical and/or sexual abuse
- a history of foster home placement
- difficulty in school related to learning disorders
- assignment to special education programs, and/or school dropout
- a history of relatively minor criminal behaviors.

The VDAP authors labeled individuals with a combination of disorders as having Horrible Life Disorder ("HLD"). This term is purposefully sensational to illustrate the extreme challenges that individuals with multiple disorders face in life and in the criminal justice system.

The first step in providing defendant accommodations to intellectually disabled defendants and defendants with HLD is recognizing signs of disability. This first step may be difficult for untrained attorneys because defendants often try to mask their disabilities during their short interaction with the court system. In fact, the VDAP authors found that attorneys often did not believe that defendants had disabilities that they did not recognize. One solution is to make sure defendants explain answers to questions rather than accepting a simple "yes." Another solution is to train attorneys to recognize disabilities during initial client interviews. By asking clients about special education programs, IEP's, mental health and substance abuse counseling, attorneys could determine whether accommodations are appropriate in the legal context.

Once an intellectually disabled defendant is identified, the VDAP provides a list of accommodations to consider. First, attorneys should question whether their clients' disabilities affected the voluntariness of their consent to searches, statements, or waiver of other rights. Secondly, the court should determine whether a "cognitive facilitator" is necessary to guide the defendant through the legal process by asking the court to use simple language or to slow down if the defendant needs further explanation. Third, the court, prosecutors, and defense counsel should ensure that defendants understand the legal obligations created by pretrial release, guilty pleas, and probation conditions. Finally, the VDAP suggests that the criminal justice system should use extensive case management for mentally disabled people and people with HLD. This approach would provide housing, sheltered employment, substance abuse counseling, and mental health services rather than using the criminal justice system as the "institution of last resort" for disabled defendants.

== Vermont Initiatives for Defendant Accommodation ==
One successful Vermont initiative for defendant accommodation noted in the VDAP was pioneered by Associate Justice Marilyn Skoglund of the Vermont Supreme Court. Justice Skoglund conducted a study to determine the required reading level for understanding court documents. The study revealed that standard conditions of release and conditions of probation forms required a 12th grade reading level—even though 95% of typical defendants in Vermont have not finished high school. In response, Justice Skoglund revised the standard conditions and application for public defender services to require an 8th grade reading level.

The VDAP provides many suggestions for defendant accommodation, such as a revised Miranda warning for intellectually disabled defendants and patients with HLD:

Source: "Vermont Defendant Accommodation Project", Public Policy, and Law, Vol. 10, No. 1/2, pg. 147 (2004)

== National statistics ==
	Percent of inmates in—			
	State prison		Local jail	
Selected characteristics	With mental problem	Without mental problem	With mental problem	Without mental problem
Current or past violent offense	61%	56%	44%	36%
3 or more prior incarcerations	25%	19%	26%	20%
Substance dependence or abuse	74%	56%	76%	53%
Drug use in month before arrest	63%	49%	62%	42%
Homelessness in year before arrest	13%	6%	17%	9%
Past physical or sexual abuse	27%	10%	24%	8%
Parents abused alcohol or drugs	39%	25%	37%	19%
Charged with violating facility rules	58%	43%	19%	9%
Physical or verbal assault	24%	14%	8%	2%
Injured in a fight since admission	20%	10%	9%	3%

Source: Bureau of Justice Statistics Special Report, September 2006
