= Vermont Department of Corrections =

American state government agency

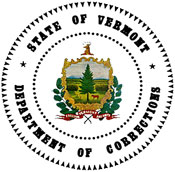
- Seal
- Abbreviation: VDOC

Jurisdictional structure
- Operations jurisdiction: Vermont, United States
- Map of Vermont Department of Corrections's jurisdiction
- Area: 9,620 square miles (24,900 km^{2})
- Population: 643,503 (2020)
- General nature: Civilian police

Operational structure
- Headquarters: Waterbury, Vermont, United States
- Agency executive: Jon Murad, Commissioner
- Parent agency: Vermont Agency of Human Services

Website
- doc.vermont.gov

The Vermont Department of Corrections is the government agency in the U.S. state of Vermont charged with overseeing correctional facilities, supervising probation and parolees, and serving in an advisory capacity in the prevention of crime and juvenile delinquency. It is a part of the Vermont Agency of Human Services.

The agency is headquartered at the Waterbury State Office Complex in Waterbury, Vermont.

Nicholas J. Deml was appointed commissioner by Vermont governor Phil Scott in November 2021. Deml replaced interim commissioner Jim Baker, who served from December 2019 until October 2021. Deml stepped down in August 2025 and was replaced by Jon Murad.

== State prison facilities ==
As of 2018, the Vermont Department of Corrections manages the operations of six prison facilities in the state of Vermont. There were 1,422 prisoners in the system in October 2024.

Name	Location	Prisoners	Gender
Northern State Correctional Facility	Newport	409	Male
Chittenden Regional Correctional Facility	South Burlington	113	Female
Marble Valley Regional Correctional Facility	Rutland	140	Male
Northeast Regional Correctional Facility	St. Johnsbury	163	Male
Northwest State Correctional Facility	Swanton	197	Male
Southern State Correctional Facility	Springfield	287	Male

Vermont's former Dale Women's Facility in Waterbury, Vermont closed in early 2009. State officials considered closing the Caledonia Community Work Camp (adjacent to the Northeast Regional Correctional Facility) in St. Johnsbury in March 2016 because of underpopulation.

While security is handled by state employees, services, such as health services, have been contracted out. There are 600 corrections officers.

The State of Vermont contracted with Corrections Corporation of America to house inmates in out-of-state private prisons beginning in the mid-1990s, and has continued the practice. About 115 prisoners are held outside the state of Vermont. These prisoners cost half as much as the prisoners in state because of the economies of scale in larger prisons, and because only healthy prisoners are exported.

In the past, the State of Vermont held prisoners at the Lee Adjustment Center in Beattyville, Kentucky (now closed), and at the Florence Correctional Center in Florence, Arizona, both CCA properties. The State of Vermont also formally contracted with the GEO Group and transferred out-of-state prisoners to the North Lake Correctional Facility in Michigan.

The State of Vermont now contracts with CoreCivic to house inmates out of state at Tallahatchie County Correctional Facility in Mississippi.

== Probation and parole offices ==
There are 13 community-based probation and parole offices throughout the state of Vermont. These are under the administrative jurisdiction of the Vermont Department of Corrections. The offices are located in Barre, Bennington, Brattleboro, Burlington, Chelsea (sub-office in Hartford District), Hartford, Middlebury (sub-office to Rutland), Morrisville, Newport, Rutland, St. Albans, St. Johnsbury, and Springfield.

== Fallen officers ==
Since the establishment of the Vermont Department of Corrections, three officers have died in the line of duty.

== See also ==
- Vermont Treatment Program for Sexual Abusers
- List of law enforcement agencies in Vermont
- Crime in Vermont
