= Cornhusker =

A Cornhusker is a person or machine that removes the husk from a corncob. It may refer to:

- Cornhusker state, the nickname of the U.S. state of Nebraska
- Nebraska Cornhuskers, the name given to the athletic teams of the University of Nebraska
- Cornhusker Clink, a planned immigration detention center in McCook, Nebraska.
