= Prairieland Detention Center =

Immigration detention facility in Texas, United States

- Location in Texas
- Location: Alvarado, Texas; 32.42277°N 97.19587°W
- Status: Operational
- Security class: Jail
- Capacity: 525
- Population: 960 (FY 2026 (YTD))
- Opened: FY 2017
- Former name: Prairieland Detention Facility
- Managed by: LaSalle Corrections

The Prairieland Detention Center is a detention facility for immigrants owned by the US Immigration and Customs Enforcement in Alvarado, Texas. Since opening in January 2017, the facility has held hundreds of detainees, with annual averages ranging from 245 to 960, the fiscal year 2026 figure. A planned unit for transgender detainees was never opened at Prairieland.

Prairieland was one of eight ICE detention facilities operating at more than a hundred inmates over its designed capacity in mid-2025. According to its builders, the facility was designed for around 500 inmates, with 70,440 square feet of housing for detainees.

At its 2017 opening, Prairieland Detention Center was operated by the private prison company Emerald Correctional Management LLC. Emerald went out of business and LaSalle Corrections took over Prairieland by 2018.

On the evening of July 4, 2025, eleven individuals set off fireworks, and vandalized parked vehicles and a guard structure in protest against the campaign of mass deportation carried out during the second presidency of Donald Trump.

== Detained population ==
Average daily population at Prairieland Detention Center
Fiscal year	ADP
FY 2017	245
FY 2019	687
FY 2020	486
FY 2021	357
FY 2022	344
FY 2023	542
FY 2024	588
FY 2025	829
FY 2026	960
