= Richwood Correctional Center =

Immigrant detention site in Monroe, Louisiana

- Interactive map of Richwood Correctional Center
- Location: Monroe, Louisiana; 32°27′25″N 92°04′42″W
- Managed by: LaSalle Corrections

Notable prisoners
- Kseniia Petrova

The Richwood Correctional Center is an immigrant detention site in Monroe, Louisiana.

== History ==
Between 2001 and 2019, the facility was contracted as a jail for the city of Monroe.

In 2015, Erie Moore Sr. died at a hospital after guards slammed him headfirst to the floor at Richwood. A decade later, a jury awarded Moore's family $19.5 million in compensatory damages and $23.25 million in punitive damages, finding LaSalle had acted with "actual malice or reckless indifference to the rights or safety of others", negligence by its employees was a "substantial factor", and that "guards had used excessive force against Mr. Moore and that the there was a “custom or practice” of punishing inmates at Richwood by using chemical spray or taking them to an area of the detention center known as the Four Way that had no surveillance cameras".

A report dated February 2023 from the Department of Homeland Security Office of Inspector General says, "We identified violations that compromised the health, safety, and rights of detainees, including facility areas that were not consistently clean or sanitary. Additionally, Richwood did not have a reliable system for detainees to file grievances and did not allow detainees to file medical grievances. (...) Richwood restricted detainees’ access to legal visitation and calls without providing justification"

In 2025, Iris Dayana Monterroso-Lemus had a stillbirth after asking to go the hospital. "she said they dismissed her concerns, telling her the pain was normal because the baby was growing". "The clinical notes state that the pregnancy was “complicated by no PNC,” meaning she had received no prenatal care."
