= South Louisiana ICE Processing Center =

Correctional facility

- Interactive map of South Louisiana ICE Processing Center
- Location: 3843 Stagg Avenue, Basile, Louisiana, United States; 30°29′14″N 92°34′58″W
- Status: Operational
- Security class: Mixed Security
- Capacity: 1,000
- Opened: 1993
- Managed by: GEO Group
- Warden: N/A

South Louisiana ICE Processing Center (also known as the Basile Detention Center, previously South Louisiana Correctional Facility) is a privately owned and operated prison facility operated by the GEO Group under contract to the federal government. It is located on the eastern edge of Basile in Evangeline Parish, Louisiana. As of February 2026, it houses 988 immigration detainees, nearly all of the women, with 13% classified as having a criminal conviction.

== History ==
The facility was opened in 1993 to serve state, federal and local uses by the private prison company LCS Corrections Services. It was later acquired by Wackenhut Corrections Corporation, renamed as The GEO Group, Inc. in 2004. The facility has a capacity of 1,000.

The facility had initially housed primarily inmates for the state's Louisiana Department of Public Safety and Corrections. It housed both male and females at a mix of minimum, medium, and maximum security, with a capacity of 1,048.

It was also used to house some persons detained by U.S. Immigration and Customs Enforcement (ICE) prior to hearings or deportation. In July and August 2009, a hundred ICE inmates at this facility staged a series of five hunger strikes to protest substandard conditions and lack of appropriate medical care.

Somewhat later, the state relocated many of its inmates to other properties, and the facility became idle. In April 2019, GEO signed a contract modification with ICE to reactivate the facility for exclusively federal use, under an "existing intergovernmental service agreement between Evangeline Parish, Louisiana and ICE". Beginning intake in third quarter 2019, the facility is now used exclusively to house male and female ICE detainees awaiting immigration court hearings and/or deportation. It is under the supervision of the ICE Field Office in New Orleans.

== Controversy ==
Since re-opening under ICE, the prison has been the subject of multiple complaints about sexual harassment, forced labor, and denial of medial care, especially in regards to transgender inmates.

== See also ==
- List of immigrant detention sites in the United States
