= Arizona Removal Operations Coordination Center =

Coordinates: 33.3034°N 111.6627°W

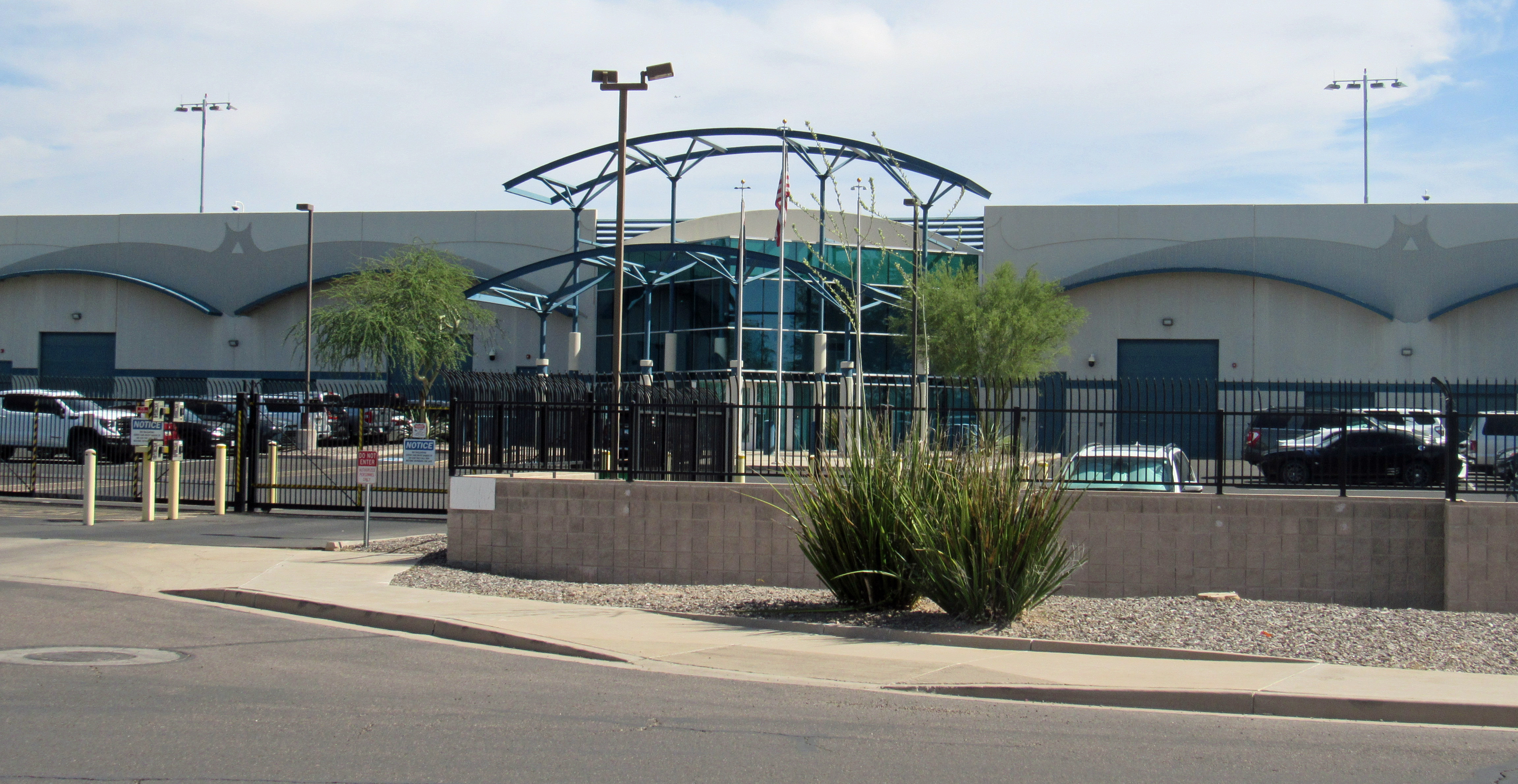
A view of the Arizona Removal Operations Coordination Center at Phoenix-Mesa Gateway Airport in Mesa, AZ

The Arizona Removal Operations Coordination Center (AROCC) is an immigration detention site and flight coordination office operated by United States Immigration and Customs Enforcement (ICE) at the Phoenix-Mesa Gateway Airport. It is the headquarters of ICE Air Operations, which operates charter flights to deport immigrants from the United States.

The site is owned by the Mesa-Gateway Airport Authority and leased to Strategic Government Properties. Many of the flights themselves are coordinated by CSI Aviation, which subcontracted with Avelo Airlines, GlobalX, and Omni Air, among other private carriers. Avelo withdrew from serving AROCC in January 2026.

== Capacity and overcrowding ==
The Center opened in 2010 with a planned capacity of 157 detainees and 79 ICE employees. A 2022 audit described the facility as a single-floor building with "10 multiple occupancy hold rooms with a total design capacity of 157." The facility also lacks beds, showers, educational or library facilities, a medical clinic, designated food service areas, and recreation facilities.

Between early 2025 and early 2026, the average population at AROCC rose from 21 prisoners per day to 276 per day.

In January 2026, the Mesa Fire and Medical Department, which had responded to a medical emergency issued a list of code violations for AROCC. The facility had housed 238 people at the time, well above the building's fire capacity of 203 individuals. However, the population soon rose, reaching 646, 526, and 777 individuals on later days in 2026. Three members of Congress reported "shocking" overcrowding in April, after visiting on a day when there were around 250 detainees.

Like other ICE hold facilities, AROCC is classified as a "12-hour facility," theoretically limiting detainee stays to a maximum of twelve hours. However, this cap has repeatedly been exceeded. In June 2025, 77 detainees being prepared for an Omni Air flight stayed at AROCC for four days. The flight later deported migrants to Bangladesh and Pakistan.

== Flight operations ==
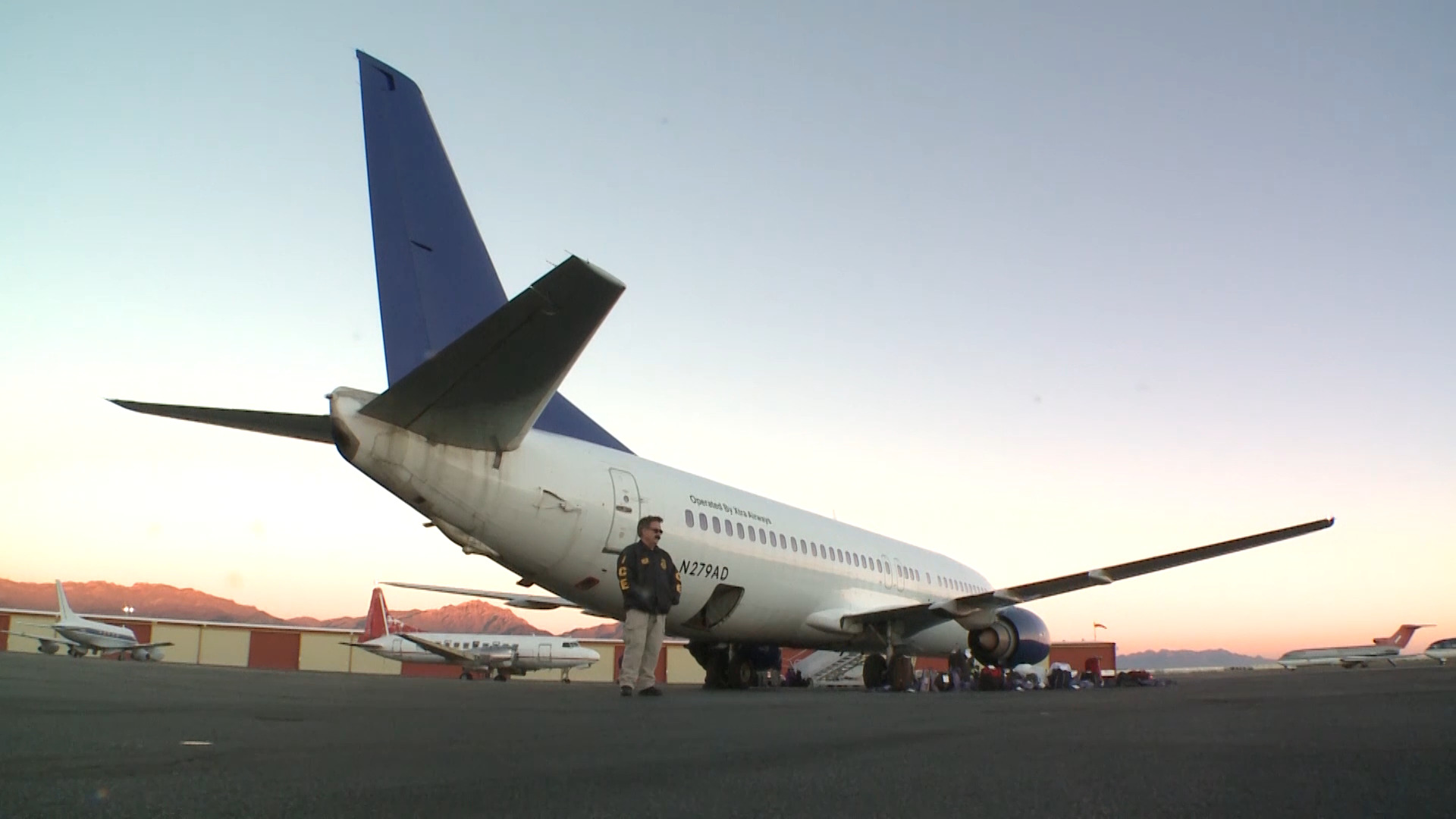
Uniformed agent of Immigration and Customs Enforcement stands by a plane as part of removal operations

In 2025, 778 ICE flights departed from the facility. There were 338 flights in the first quarter of 2026.
