= Jefferson County Jail =

Jefferson County Jail may refer to:

- Jefferson County Jail (Monticello, Florida), listed on the National Register of Historic Places (NRHP) in Jefferson County
- Jefferson County Jail (Madison, Indiana), NRHP-listed in Jefferson County
- Jefferson County Jail (Louisville, Kentucky), NRHP-listed in Jefferson County
