= Flagler County Jail =

Flagler County Florida jail

Flagler County Jail (WPA-Built)
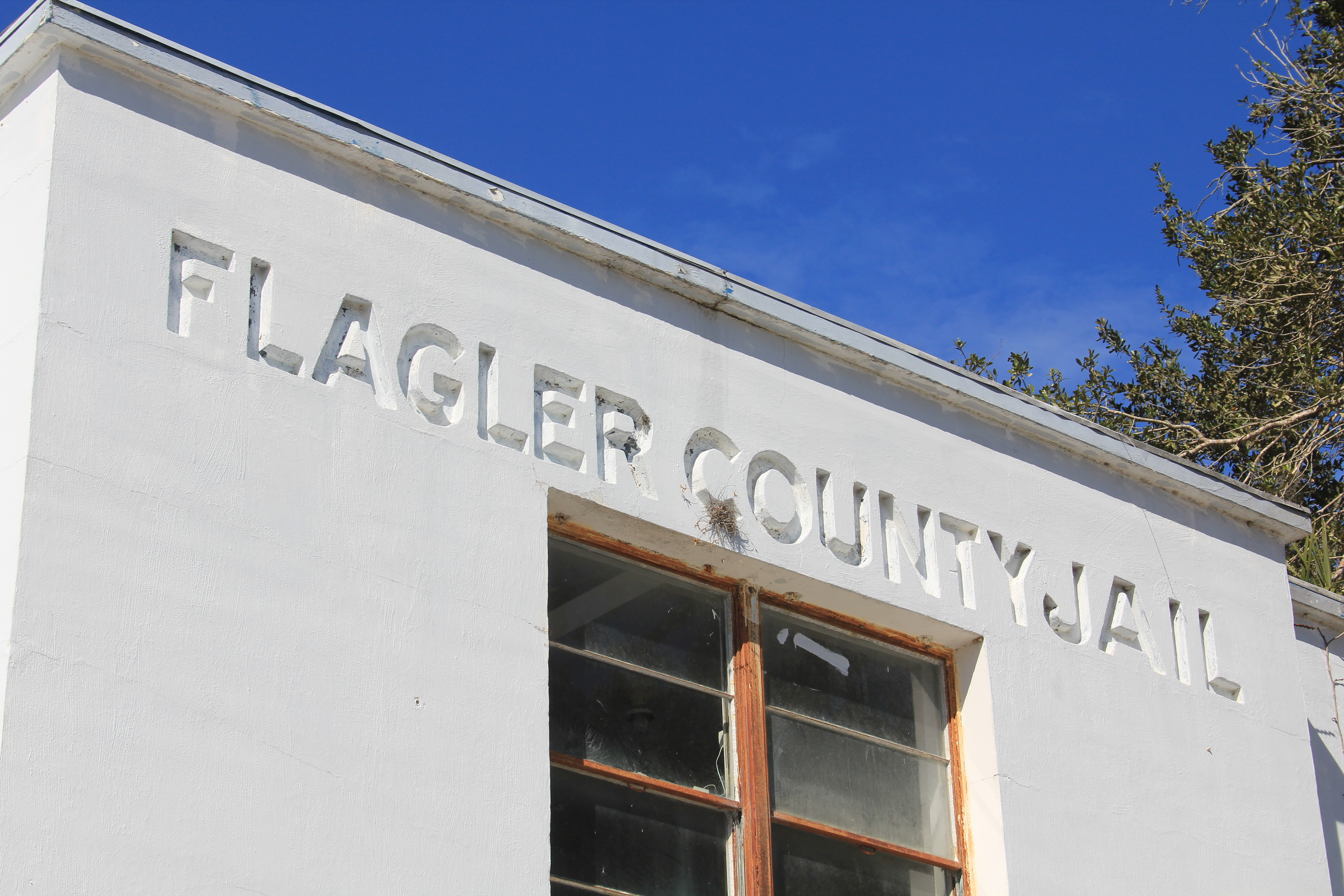
- The WPA-Built Flagler County Jail's inset name on the front of the building.

- Location within Florida Location within the United States
- Former names: Flagler County Jail

General information
- Type: Jail
- Architectural style: WPA Rustic
- Location: Bunnell, Florida, 1600 Old Moody Blvd., Bunnell, FL
- Coordinates: 29°28′31.804″N 81°14′56.479″W
- Elevation: ,
- Completed: 1940
- Demolished: 2019
- Cost: $24,000 ($548,936 in 2025 dollars)
- Owner: Flagler County, Florida

Technical details
- Floor area: 6,337 square feet (590 m^{2})

During the 1930s, the Flagler County, Florida Jail (also known locally as the "Stockade") was in dire need of repairs and enlargement. Flagler County Commissioners were under pressure from local citizens and grand juries to repair the building or erect a new one. After months of negotiations, during 1938, between the Flagler County Board of Commissioners and the Works Progress Administration WPA an agreement to build a new Flagler County Jail building was approved. A WPA Project, No. 4242, was approved that cost approximately $24,000 ($548,936 in 2025 dollars). It was agreed that the costs would be divided between Flagler County and the WPA. Construction of the new Flagler County Jail started January 25, 1939 under the management of Z. D. Holland, WPA Supervisor and well known local contractor. It was built on 2.04 acres of county-owned property located at 1600 Old Moody Blvd., Bunnell, FL.

The construction project took a little over one year to complete as it was finished in early February 1940. The WPA, represented by Z. D. Holland, officially transferred sole responsibility of the finished building to the Flagler County government on February 2, 1940. Flagler County Commissioners promptly turned the keys to the building over to Flagler County Sheriff Ernest Walton “E.W.” Johnston who moved the county’s sheriff department into the new building and officially opened the jail.

== Architectural attributes ==
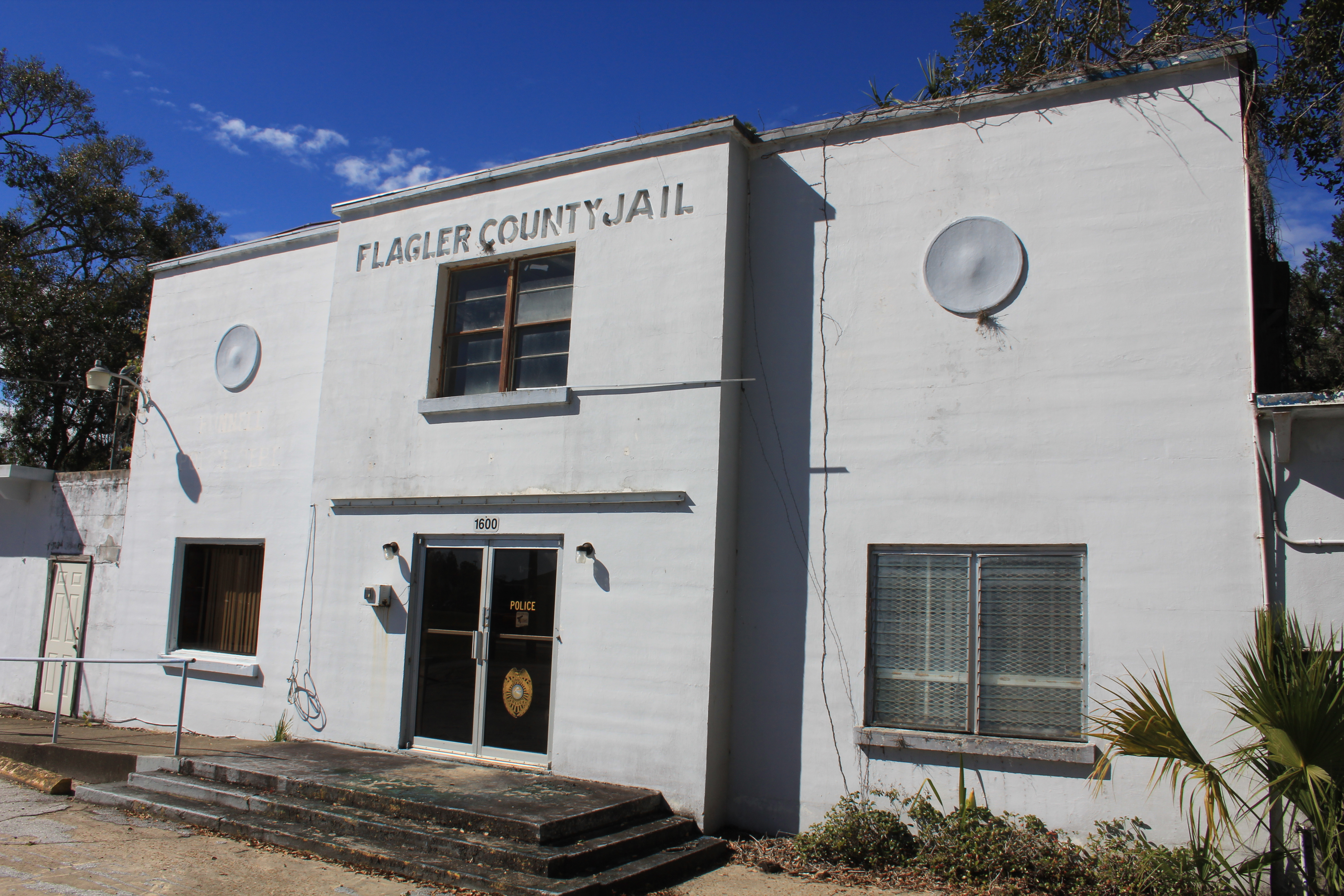
Front East View of the WPA-Built Flagler County Jail (Photo taken January 2019).

The WPA-Built Flagler County Jail’s architectural style was classified as WPA Rustic as it was built during the New Deal-era. This term is used by the National Park Service’s National Register of Historic Places program to classify many buildings and structures that were built by the WPA in the 1930s and early 1940s. It also has classic Masonry Vernacular architectural attributes which are mainly associated with public and commercial buildings that were built and designed by local builders who had no formal architectural education, and typically used traditional construction techniques and contemporary fashions. The function of the building is the dominant factor in this architectural style.

The two story poured concrete building contained 6337 square feet. The first floor included an entrance lobby, heating and storage room, living quarters for the sheriff and a prisoner’s kitchen. The second floor included rooms for the guards and space to house 22 prisoners. It was alleged to be fireproof and said to be built like a tank by locals.

== Jail operations ==
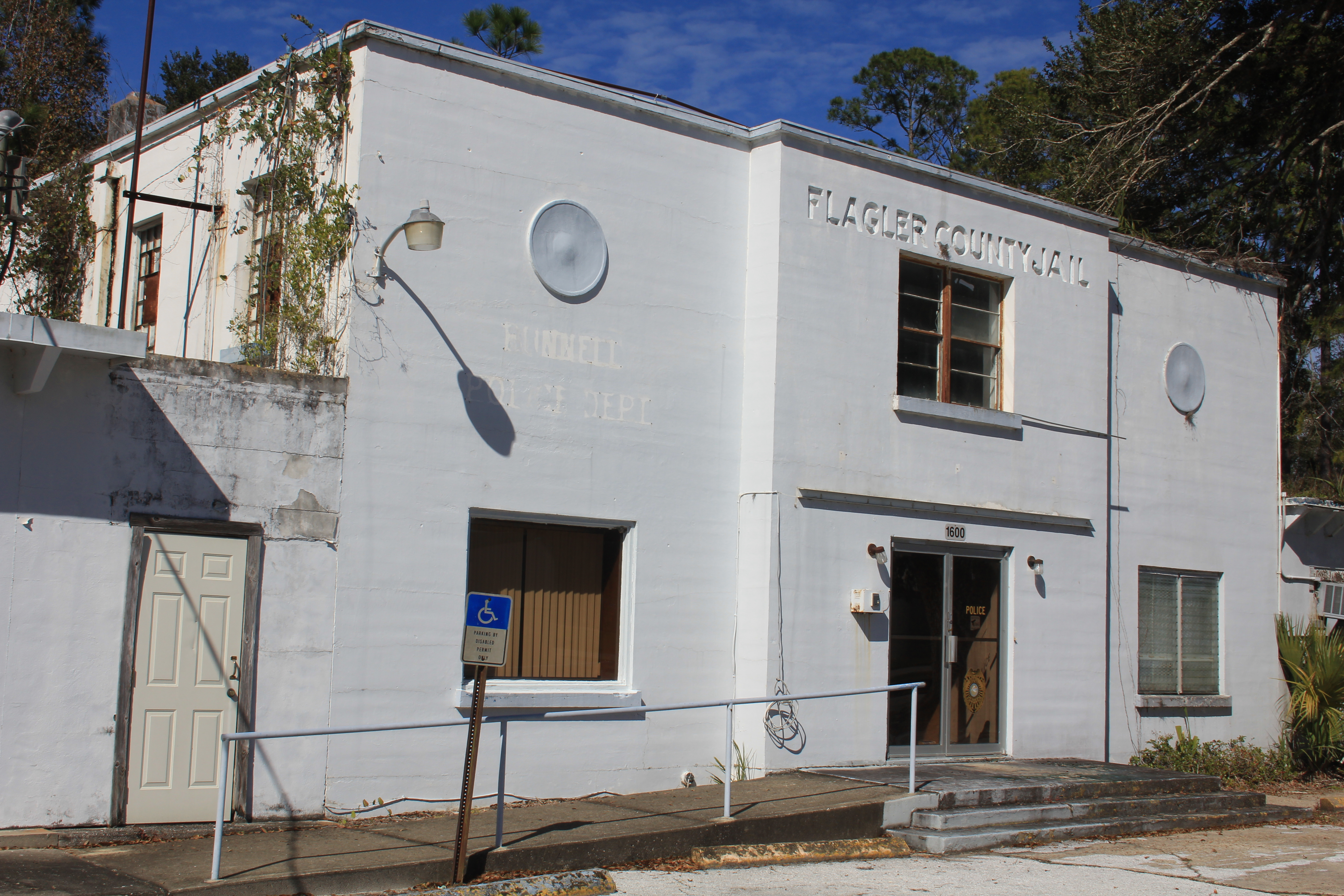
Front West View of the WPA-Built Flagler County Jail (Photo taken January 2019).

The building served as the Flagler County Jail from 1940 until the 1980s when a newer and larger building with 132 beds and a women’s wing was completed. During the 1940s into the 1960s, racial segregation mandated that the Flagler County Jail incarcerate white prisoners only (despite the fact that half of its construction funding came from federal dollars). During this period of racial segregation, black prisoners were incarcerated across the street in the older concrete block Flagler County Jail “Stockade” building. In 1965, an east wing was built for juvenile operations. In 1975, a west wing was built for additional administration operations.

== Other building usages ==
From 1995 through early 2019, the Church Women United have been using parts of the building as their food pantry and storage facility. The Flagler County Supervisor of Elections office was housed in the north addition from the mid-1990s to around 2005. The City of Bunnell Police Department occupied the building from 1987 to 2012. Also, Flagler County used the building for various storage items since the Flagler County Jail offices moved out in the 1980s.

== Historical significance ==
The WPA-Built Flagler County Jail building was part of the group of Florida structures that were built for distinct public uses during the Great Depression (New Deal-era). These types of structures represent a small percentage of the buildings that were constructed during this period, but are important property types because they summarize the design creativity for specific usages for public facilities. The structures are also historically significant because they represent the first time that United States governmental agencies were linked to state and local agencies to provide mass employment that stimulated local economies and resulted in upgrading many facets of the national infrastructure. Florida’s New Deal heritage is characterized and lives within these structures.

The WPA-Built Flagler County Jail was one of only three buildings constructed by the WPA in Flagler County. The other two are on the National Register of Historic Places: Bunnell Coquina City Hall and the Vocational Agriculture Building.

== Demolition ==
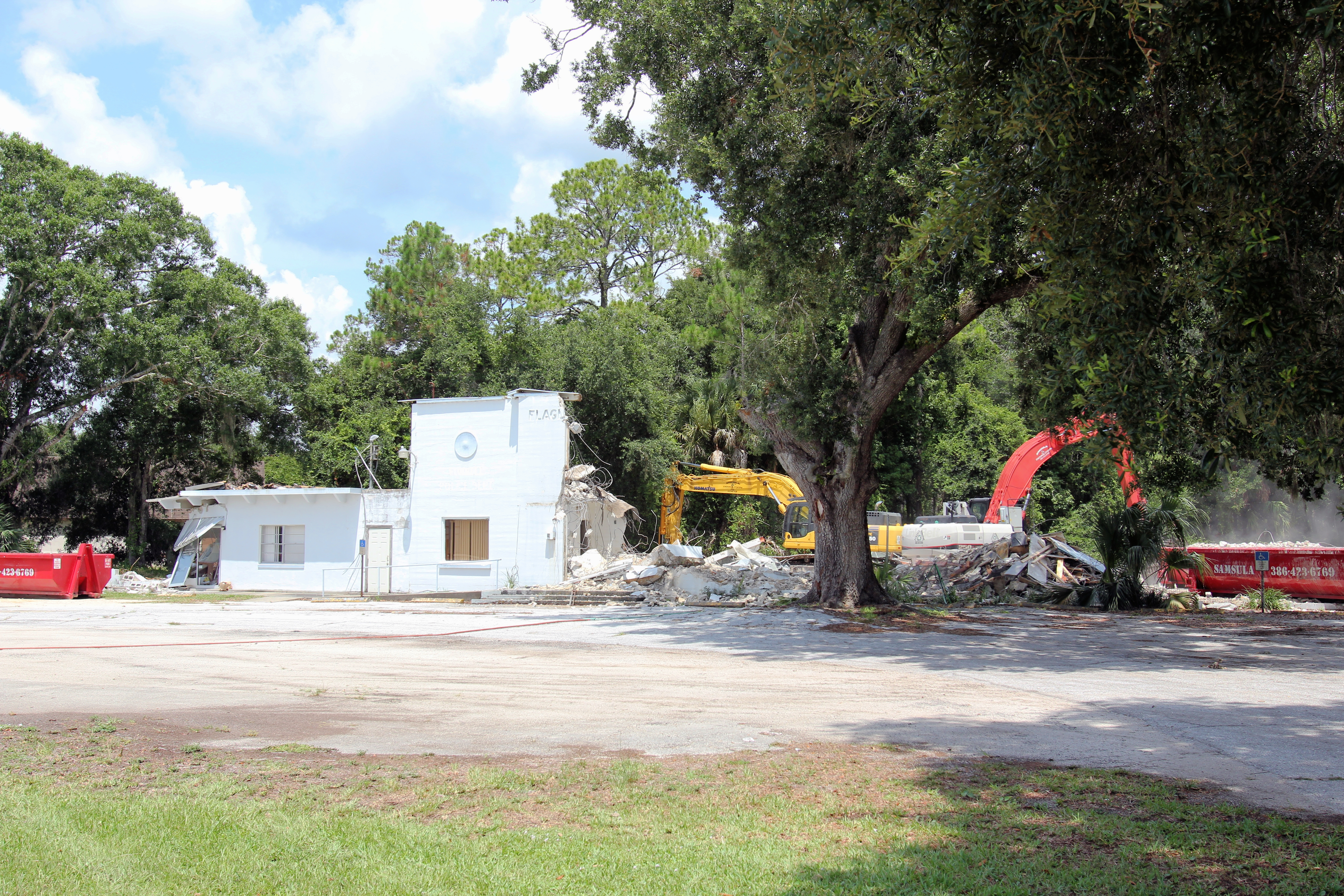
Demolition of the WPA-Built Flagler County Jail (Photo taken on July 8, 2019).

In early 2019, the Flagler County Commissioners voted to demolish the building stating it was a liability. Over a two week period from late June into early July 2019 the structure was demolished.
