= Jefferson County Jail (Madison, Indiana) =

- U.S. National Register of Historic Places
- U.S. Historic district – Contributing property
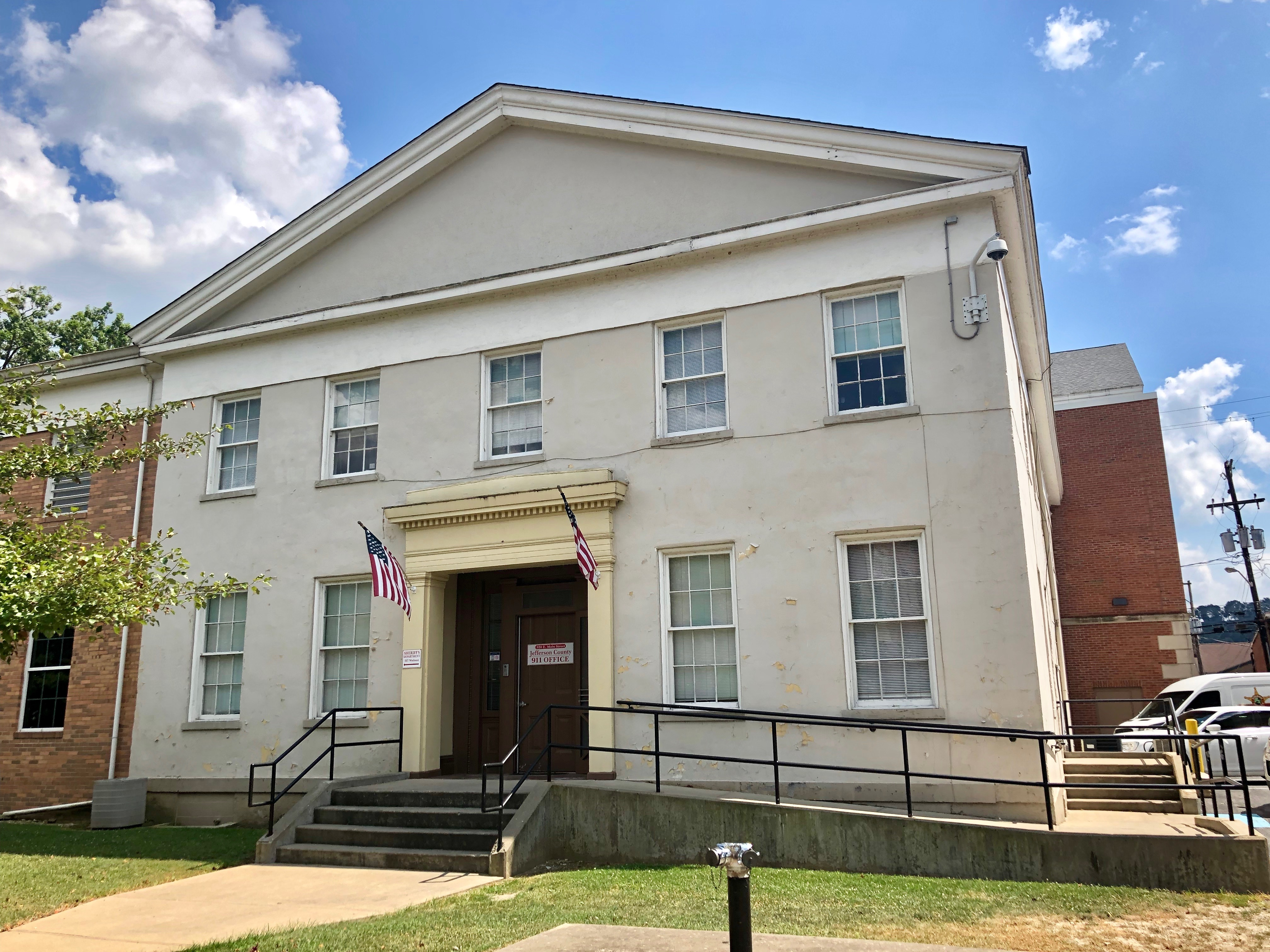
- Jefferson County Jail, July 2019

- Location within Indiana Location within the United States
- Location: Courthouse Sq., Madison, Indiana
- Coordinates: 38°44′10″N 85°22′35″W
- Area: 0.5 acres (0.20 ha)
- Built: 1848-1850, 1859
- Architect: Multiple
- Architectural style: Greek Revival
- NRHP reference No.: 73000019
- Added to NRHP: June 18, 1973

Jefferson County Jail, also known as Jefferson County Jail and Sheriffs House, is a historic jail and residence located at Madison, Indiana. It was built between 1848 and 1850, and is a two-story, rectangular Greek Revival style masonry building. The building consists of two blocks: a residential section in front and jail block at the rear. A kitchen wing was added in 1859. It features a classic pedimented gable temple front with a recessed entrance and pilasters.

It was listed on the National Register of Historic Places in 1973. It is located in the Madison Historic District.
