= Massachusetts Correctional Institution – Plymouth =

Prison in Massachusetts, United States

Coordinates: 41°50′55″N 70°39′40″W

MCI - Plymouth
- Interactive map of MCI - Plymouth
- Location: Plymouth, MA
- Status: Operational
- Security class: Level 3 (Minimum) Pre-Release facility
- Capacity: 211
- Population: 199
- Opened: 1952
- Managed by: Massachusetts Department of Correction
- Director: Acting Superintendent Noemi Cruz

Massachusetts Correctional Institution – Plymouth or MCI - Plymouth is a minimum-security prison facility located in the Myles Standish State Forest in Plymouth, Massachusetts. It is not to be confused with much larger Plymouth County Correctional Facility, also located in Plymouth.
