= Cornhusker Clink =

Detention center in McCook, Nebraska, U.S.

McCook Detention Center (Cornhusker Clink)
- Interactive map of McCook Detention Center (Cornhusker Clink)
- Location: 2309 US-83, McCook, Nebraska, U.S.; 40.228069871414085°N 100.64884827056932°W
- Status: Operational
- Security class: Immigration detention center
- Capacity: 280
- Opened: November 9, 2025
- Managed by: Nebraska Department of Correctional Services; United States Department of Homeland Security

The McCook Detention Center, nicknamed the 'Cornhusker Clink', is an immigration detention center in McCook, Nebraska, United States. The center was announced in August 2025 and officially opened in November. It was developed by the Department of Homeland Security and is operated by the Nebraska Department of Correctional Services. The plan for the facility was to convert the McCook Work Ethic Camp, a rehabilitative minimum-security prison labor camp, to a detention center for the United States Immigration and Customs Enforcement (ICE) with an expansion to 280 beds. Development came after other immigration detention centers, like Alligator Alcatraz in Florida, were opened by the Trump Administration.

== History ==
The McCook Work Ethic Camp was originally authorized in 1997 and opened in 2001. Its aim was to rehabilitate prisoners before they left prison to enter wider society. Most prisoners were transferred to the Work Ethic Camp from other prisons in Nebraska near the ends of their sentences.

A plan to transform the camp to an ICE detention facility was made with a three-year agreement between Nebraska governor Jim Pillen and the DHS with Kristi Noem on August 19, 2025. The agreement included an expansion to house 300 inmates, up from 200 as of 2023, up to 365 days. Pillen stated that he did not know if the prison would house women and children in addition to men. He also announced that the Nebraska National Guard would be ordered to provide logistical and administrative support to ICE agents based in Nebraska. To make room for the detention center, all 186 inmates that were at the Work Ethic Camp were moved to different facilities.

Several lawsuits were filed in order to prevent the detention center's opening. Most notably, The attempt to create an injunction to block the opening of the facility was itself blocked by Judge Patrick Heng. The lawsuit delayed the opening of the facility, and Heng allowed for the facility to open in early November. On November 3, Pillen stated that it was expected to become operational by the end of that week. Three days later, Cornhusker Clink officially began operations.

== Reactions ==
Upon its announcement, the prison received criticism from many Nebraska lawmakers and the Nebraska ACLU. Protestors sat outside of the governor's office on the afternoon after the announcement. Pillen and the DHS also received criticism for using the word "Cornhusker" in the detention center's name, which is a moniker used by the University of Nebraska–Lincoln for their sports teams. The University of Nebraska system issued a statement distancing themselves from the Cornhusker Clink, and that they did not give permission for the moniker to be used. While the term "Cornhusker" is officially trademarked by the University of Nebraska system, they also recognize it as a common word and did not prevent the state from using it for the prison.
