= Val Verde Correctional Facility =

Private prison in Del Rio, Texas

Coordinates: 29°22′24″N 100°50′52″W

- Interactive map of Val Verde Correctional Facility
- Location: 253 FM 2523 Del Rio, Texas
- Status: open
- Security class: medium
- Capacity: 1407
- Opened: 1998
- Managed by: GEO Group

The Val Verde Correctional Facility is a privately owned and operated prison, located in Del Rio, Val Verde County, Texas, operated by the GEO Group under contract with the county of Val Verde. The county, in turn, contracts with U.S. Immigration and Customs Enforcement, United States Marshals Service, and the U.S. Customs and Border Protection.

The facility holds a maximum of 1407 male and female prisoners, and was built in 1998.

== History ==
Val Verde has had a troubled history. In early 2004 female detainee LeTisha Tapia reported to the warden that male and female prisoners were having regular sexual contact with the approval of guards. She was then sexually assaulted by inmates and an officer as punishment for being a 'snitch'. Tapia hanged herself. Her family sued and settled. The money damages were undisclosed but the settlement terms mandated a full-time county monitor.

In 2006 GEO Group also settled a lawsuit brought by a former black guard whose supervisor "kept a hangman’s noose in his office and a Polaroid photo of himself in a Ku Klux Klan hood in his desk."

In July 2007 the Idaho Department of Corrections moved about 60 prisoners into Val Verde, roughly half of the Idaho prisoners withdrawn from another GEO Group facility in Texas for maltreatment. The following month two inmates died of dehydration and two others hospitalized by a "mysterious illness". (The Idaho prisoners returned home no later than July 2009.)

In May 2008 former guard Emmanuel Cassio pleaded guilty to federal civil rights charges brought from a 2006 incident where he punched an inmate, then obstructed the investigation. Cassio had been 19 years old at the time. In 2007 another Val Verde guard was caught attempting to smuggle love letters and "cheap wine" into the facility. She was sentenced to serve time where she'd worked.

In 2015 the former laundry supervisor at Val Verde was under federal indictment for the sexual abuse of a ward. The supervisor faced a 15 year sentence.
