= Denver Contract Detention Facility =

Immigration detention center in Colorado, US

- Location in Colorado
- Location: Aurora, Colorado, US; 39.76135°N 104.84902°W
- Status: Operational
- Security class: Private Migrant Detention Center
- Population: 1226 (FY 2026 (YTD))
- Opened: FY 2010
- Managed by: GEO Group

The Denver Contract Detention Facility, also known as the Aurora ICE Processing Center, is a privately run immigration detention center located in Aurora, Colorado. It is operated by the GEO Group, a private prison corporation, under contract from US Immigration and Customs Enforcement. Its capacity was increased from 1,360 to 1,530 in late 2025. It is the only major ICE detention facility in Colorado.

US Congressman Jason Crow was denied entry for an inspection visit to the facility in January 2026.

== History ==
The Wackenhut Corrections Corporation (later renamed The GEO Group), established in 1984, received its first contract for an immigration detention facility to operate the Aurora-based facility in 1987. The facility was built in 150 days.

In July 2026, an employee, who was leaving the facility, shot a protestor in the foot with his personal firearm during a confrontation. The employee faces charges including attempted second-degree murder.

== Layout ==
The facility includes one large detention "North" building and a smaller annex (subdivided into East and West), connected by a covered walkway. Male detainees are housed in both the North and Annex buildings; female and transgender detainees are in separate housing units in the Annex.

== Population size ==
Average daily population at Denver Contract Detention Facility
Fiscal year	ADP
FY 2010	414
FY 2011	415
FY 2012	400
FY 2013	412
FY 2014	417
FY 2015	395
FY 2016	477
FY 2017	759
FY 2019	888
FY 2020	462
FY 2021	378
FY 2022	527
FY 2023	697
FY 2024	1,021
FY 2025	1,181
FY 2026	1,226

== Deaths in detention and detainee treatment ==
As of 2022, there had been three deaths of detainees at the facility.

In 2017, 64-year-old detainee Kamyar Samimi died after two weeks in the Aurora detention facility. Samimi had been receiving methadone treatment for two decades to manage his opioid addiction, but was denied access to the drug once detained. According to a review of records by Colorado Public Radio, as Samimi underwent withdrawal, medical staff in the facility skipped multiple medical checks on him and "used a withdrawal protocol for alcohol — not opioids." The American Civil Liberties Union filed a wrongful death lawsuit in September 2019 in his case.

In 2022, 39-year-old detainee Melvin Ariel Calero Mendoza died of a pulmonary embolism while detained at the Aurora facility. Records showed that Calero-Mendoza "had been complaining for weeks about pain and swelling in his leg." In a 911 call after the prisoner collapsed, a facility employee failed to share specifics on the man's medical condition, misstated the facility access and put the 911 dispatcher on hold. An attorney for the family stated, "The depth of indifference that this caller displayed was shocking. The family is disappointed and horrified by this call."

In March 2026, a coalition of groups, including the American Friends Service Committee, issued a report on conditions in the Aurora facility based on the testimony of 31 detainees. The report alleged neglect of physical and mental health conditions, malnutrition, extreme temperatures, physical and emotional abuse, and forced labor. The GEO Group denied the accusations.

In July 2026, the Aurora City Council demanded that The GEO Group cooperate with the city's investigation into a case of tuberculosis at the detention center.
