= Central Arizona Florence Correctional Complex =

Prison in Florence, Arizona

Coordinates: 33°02′39″N 111°22′30″W

- Interactive map of Central Arizona Florence Correctional Complex
- Location: 1155 North Pinal Parkway and 1100 Bowling Road Florence, Arizona
- Status: open
- Security class: Multi Level Security
- Capacity: 5,003
- Opened: 1994
- Managed by: CoreCivic
- Warden: Kris Kline

The Central Arizona Florence Correctional Complex, is a privately owned and operated managed prison located in Florence, Pinal County, Arizona. The facility is run by CoreCivic and houses prisoners for the United States Marshals Service (USMS), TransCor America LLC, U.S. Immigration and Customs Enforcement (ICE), Pascua Yaqui Tribe, United States Air Force, City of Coolidge, and City of Mesa. The majority are awaiting the resolution of their trials. The current population is male and female.

The 434,000 square foot facility is located on 73 acres of land. The facility has approximately 18 housing units. The U.S. Marshal Service holds the majority of the housing units, U.S. Immigration and Customs Enforcement holds one housing unit, City of Coolidge and City of Mesa are placed in a shared housing unit. As of 2021, the average population of inmates and detainees is 3,572. With the average stay at 108 days.

== History ==
=== 2017 ===
In June, City of Mesa voted to become the first city in Arizona with a private jail. The council voted to enter into a three-year, $15 million contract with CoreCivic to transport and house misdemeanor offenders in a separate section of the facility. Previously the offenders were housed in Maricopa County's Fourth Avenue Jail. The contract with CoreCivic for transportation and housing is expected to cost the city $5 million annually. The city would pay CoreCivic a $35,000 monthly transportation fee and $68 per inmate, per day — with the ability to decrease the daily rate if the city has more than 200 inmates per day.

=== 2018 ===
In Early 2018, Central Arizona Detention Center and Florence Correctional Center combined to become Central Arizona Florence Correctional Complex.

In May 2018, Kris Kline became the Warden.

=== 2020 ===
As of September, the facility will hold Idaho Department of Corrections inmates. CAFCC and sister facility, Saguaro Correctional Facility, will share up to 1200 inmates. The current contract is 5 years.

== Employment ==
The facility currently employs more than 800 staff with the majority being Correctional Officers.

=== Background ===
Staff members are required to undergo a background check upon their employment and as well every 5 years.

Drug tests are also administrated at random.

=== Wages ===
As of December 2019, the average wage for a Correctional Officer was $48,630. Which is significantly less than local agencies.

=== Union ===
Correctional Officers are unionized by The International Union, Security, Police, and Fire Professionals of America (SPFPA).

Maintenance Workers are unionized by UA Local 469 Plumbers and Pipefitters Union

=== Training ===
Once employed, Correctional Officers are then placed in a 6 week training course from basic report writing to physical handling.

They must pass the academy to work in the detention center.

Staff are also required to complete annual training via web classes and also a week of remedial training in class.

They are also required to complete annual weapons training, chemical training, and critical incident response training (CIRT).

If a Correctional Officer fails at any of these annual requirements, they may be terminated.

== Controversies ==
=== COVID-19 ===
As of May 2020, the facility had 400 cases of COVID-19 with 13 positives for the inmate population. 7 staff members were on quarantine as well. Current inmates, with the help of the ACLU of Arizona, have filed with the United States District Court against the warden and other officials stating "unconstitutional conditions of confinement".

=== The End of Private Prisons? ===
On January 26, 2021 President Joe Biden signed an Executive Order that would prevent the Justice Department from contracting with private prisons once their contracts were complete. President Joe Biden said that his executive order is part of an effort to promote racial equity and is needed to "stop corporations from profiteering off of incarcerating" people in facilities.

During an Earnings Call In February 2021, President and Chief Executive Officer Damon Hininger stated "we do not believe the USMS currently has sufficient detention capacity that satisfies their need without the private sector". Hininger also added "If you've got someone that's, say, in Phoenix, Arizona, and they're going through the federal courts there in Phoenix, they cannot be housed in a neighboring state. They've got to be easily within 25 to 50 miles of the courthouse just so that they can be active, participate in a legal proceedings, be close proximity with family and friends, and also be in close proximity with legal representation."

U.S Immigration Customs and Enforcement is also not affected by this order.

=== Maintenance Strike ===
In August of 2022, Unionized Maintenance Workers stood out on a picket line outside the facility demanding better wages and a safer work environment. The workers stated that recent negotiations have been "insulting" with an offer of under a $1. The company has responded stating that they provide "Competitive Wages" but will also "Ensure that Operations will not be interrupted during this time"

== Achievements ==
=== Medical ===
On October 23, 2018 the facility was also recognized by the National Commission on Correctional Health Care for its extensive training that is required among their regular health education. The nonprofit organization provides health accreditation and educational programs for correctional facilities throughout the country.
