= Montgomery ICE Processing Center =

Immigration detention center in Texas, US

- Location in Texas
- Location: Conroe, Texas; 30.33608°N 95.44251°W
- Status: Operational
- Security class: Private Migrant Detention Center
- Capacity: 1314
- Population: 1227 (FY 2026 (YTD))
- Opened: FY 2019
- Managed by: GEO Group

The Montgomery Processing Center is a private immigration detention center located in Conroe, Texas. It is operated by the GEO Group, a private prison corporation, under contract from the United States Immigration and Customs Enforcement.

The facility was expanded from a capacity of 1,000 to 1,314 detainees in 2019.

The Montgomery ICE Processing Center has a significant number of detainees in solitary confinement: 109 detainees in 2022 and 210 in 2023. A 2014 investigation by Houston Landing found that at least five detainees had been held for longer than the 15-day period in solitary considered torture by the United Nations. In 2026, the Texas Observer reported overcrownding at the facility with 60 people held in cell blocks intended for 45, and unsanitary conditions at the facility.

== Detainees ==
Average daily population at Montgomery ICE Processing Center
Fiscal year	ADP
FY 2019	951
FY 2020	626
FY 2021	387
FY 2022	653
FY 2023	976
FY 2024	1,170
FY 2025	1,217
FY 2026	1,227
