= Eden Detention Center =

Prison in Texas, United States

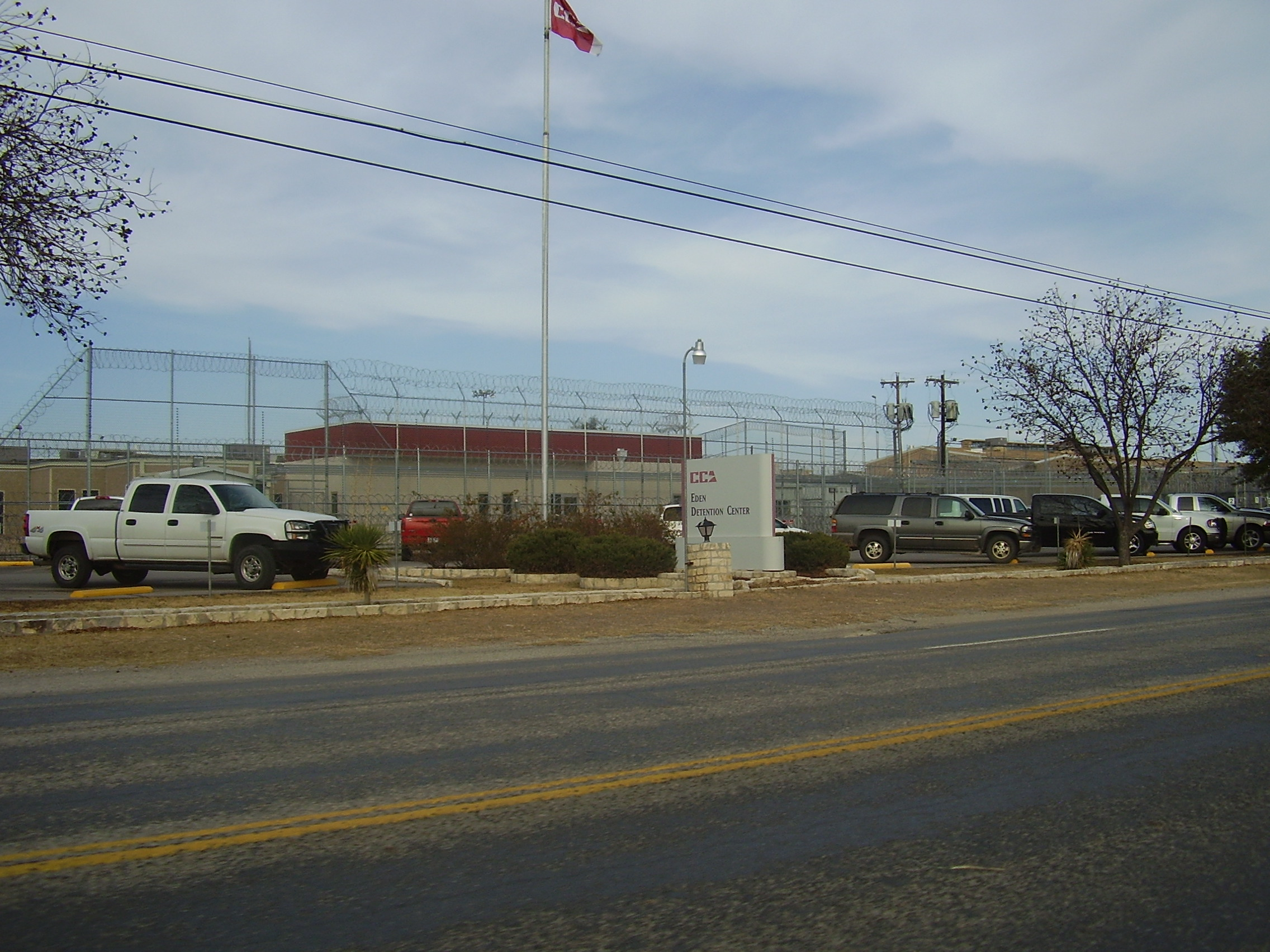
- Interactive map of Eden Detention Center
- Location: 702 E Broadway Street Eden, Texas, US; 31°13′01″N 99°50′02″W
- Status: Open
- Security class: low
- Capacity: 1558
- Population: 1,370 (2016)
- Opened: 1985
- Closed: 2017, reopened 2019
- Managed by: Corrections Corporation of America

Eden Detention Center is a privately owned and operated prison for men located in Eden, Texas, United States. Run by the Corrections Corporation of America, the low-security facility was established in 1985 under a contract with the Federal Bureau of Prisons (FBOP). A large percentage of inmates are composed of illegal migrants from Mexico and other Latin American countries.

== History ==
Initially, the creation of a privately run prison was seen as a benefit to the town of Eden, bringing in job opportunities and growth. Upon its opening in 1985, it employed 27 people, or 2% of the town's population.

Renovations to the prison were made to the center in 1988 to make up for structural insecurities discovered from the initial construction, which lacked appropriate oversight to ensure safety of prisoners.

On 1 December 1988, many prisoners from EDC were temporarily transferred to other federal prisons following a fire that broke out in the attic of the center, causing damage to certain parts of the facility. No injuries were reported. An open house was held in January 1989 to showcase renovations made to the public following the blaze.

In response to growing need for more space and the success of the privately owned model, EDC began its first expansion in 1990. A second expansion came in the form of added housing and recreation in 1995 following the expectation that the center would increase its population by 296, to a total of 950 inmates. The dormitory ended up seeing actual capacity raised to 1,006.

A 1993 agreement between Attorney General Janet Reno and Mexican Attorney General Jorge Carpizo based on the Immigration and Nationality Act (INA) reduced the overall prison population after agreeing to deport non-naturalized criminals back to Mexico to serve out their sentence. Prisons like EDC were specifically affected due to their high Hispanic populations.

In October 1995, owner Roy Burnes, who had owned the prison since its creation, sold the EDC to Corrections Corporation of America (now CoreCivic) for $18,000,000. During the transition, Larry Craven was named interim warden, and Dolan Waller was named assistant warden.

CCA sold the center to Prison Realty Corp. in 1999 for $28,000,000. Within the same year, Prison Realty Corp. merged with CCA.

In August 2016, Department of Justice officials reported that the FBOP would be reducing its use of contracted facilities, on the grounds that private prisons provided less effective and less safe services with no major cost reductions. The agency expects to permit current contracts on its thirteen remaining private facilities to expire.

The facility was shut down in 2017 when the contract with the FBOP was terminated. In 2019, the facility was reopened under a different contract with the U.S. Immigration and Customs Enforcement for 660 beds and the United States Marshals Service for 844 beds.

=== Prisoner protests ===
Throughout the history of Eden Detention Center, there have been several protests, petitions, and riots by prisoners against alleged substandard living conditions and lack of wanted privileges.

==== Petition protest ====
In June 1987, 111 prisoners detained in the center (67.6% of all inmates) signed a letter complaining of civil rights violations and violations of prison standards, including: overcrowding beyond capacity, poor sanitation standards, and cost-cutting necessities for profit, such as denying prisoners changes of clothes or any underwear at all. Center president Roy Burnes denied the allegations, and San Antonio federal inspector John Morris stated that some of the complaints were overexaggerated. Further research by locals of the town concerned with the complaints agreed with federal investigations that prisoners had heavily embellished issues with the prison.

==== Mexican cuisine protest ====
During the evening of 23 May 1989, a formal protest was held where over 300 prisoners at the facility refused to return to their cells, citing substandard living conditions and unacceptable food quality. 12 law enforcement agencies deployed officers to deal with the situation. Several mattresses were burned by prisoners, but no injuries were reported on either side. An agreement was reached between four inmates, two representatives from the Federal Bureau of Prisons, and two representatives from the prison administration to supply better quality food (specifically, Mexican cuisine) and to provide Spanish reading materials to Hispanic inmates, who composed 95% of all incarcerated people at the prison. Greg Bogdan of the FBP stated that the negotiation was the first of its kind between inmates and the department. The protest in total lasted over 20 hours. Some speculate that the unusually high temperatures that week (with a maximum recorded temperature of 107 F) aggravated the prisoners beyond normal grievances.

==== Recreation time protest ====
A similar protest to the May 1989 staging occurred on 29 October 1989, only 5 months after the previous one. A protest was held by 284 prisoners in the same manner in demand of more recreational privileges, sparked by a change in prisoner schedules. Unlike the previous protest, negotiations "fell through", and prisoners proceeded to riot, smashing windows, setting off fire extinguishers, and breaking cameras and furniture, costing thousands of dollars in damages. Police forces arrived in riot gear and confined prisoners to the courtyard. Following the disturbance, Ron Smith retired from position of prison superintendent, and was replaced by James T Kimberling, a former employee of the Federal Bureau of Prisons.

==== Vegetable protest ====
A fourth protest occurred on 6 March 1991 when three quarters of the 479 inmates refused to return to their quarters, although they did not initially set any demands, to the confusion of many administrators. After taking over the food service area, many began engaging in food fights and started small fires. Demands were eventually released by prisoners, requesting more vegetables for prison meals. They allegedly held off authorities with baseball bats and kitchen utensils. The riot caused an estimated $250,000 in damages and one inmate was hospitalized after suffering a heart attack. Unpopular locally, many residents of Eden and the surrounding areas felt that the FBI and prison superintendent caving to protestors was done in poor taste.

==== Mexican cuisine protest II ====
A 5th protest nearly broke out when six inmates attempted to organize another one regarding food issues and medical care, acting up around 2:30 PM on 31 July 1991. They were quickly confined to separate quarters from the rest of the inmates. They were allegedly upset about the change in dinner for the evening, which consisted of chicken fried steak, rather than the Mexican food that was established following the May 1989 protest. Warden Jim Kimberling stated that the situation was defused once the old menu was brought back.

==== Food order protest ====
26 June 1992 saw a sixth protest (turned riot) by prisoners, who were dissatisfied with the order in which food was served that evening. Setting fire to the recreation center and library, the protesting inmates destroyed the roof of the building and many contents surrounding it. Rocks were also used as trajectory weapons. The protest was quelled through a negotiation with prison staff who agreed to implement a new serving system by July and agreed to allow prisoners to receive X-rated materials.

An aftershock of the protest continued two days later, leading to administrator John Morris requesting "30 to 35 ringleaders" be split up in various other federal prisons. Morris sent a total of 54 people who were behind the uprising to various county jails throughout Texas, and claimed "that [they] won't be as comfortable as what we have here at E.D.C.", citing that although they consistently participated in protests against conditions, that the dormitories at EDC were fully stocked with televisions and microwave ovens. It was later revealed that the second round of protesting occurred after several inmates were upset that there had not gotten adequate news coverage of the incident.

==== Reeves transfers ====
In a turn of events, May 1994 saw EDC receive 20 prisoners from the Reeves County Detention Complex following a protest at the Reeves facility that saw prisoners burning mattresses in protest of quarters inspections by guards. The protests occurred on 18 and 19 May, and prisoners were transferred following 20 May.

A second incident in August 1994 saw six more inmates transferred to EDC from Reeves after riots sparked from corporate downsizing that resulted in the destruction of big screen TVs, exercise equipment, soda dispensers, and foosball tables. They also complained of 'salty water'.

==== SWAT standoff ====
21 August 1995 saw the most violent standoff during a protest yet. Rather than negotiate similar to previous protests, the administration took up to calling SWAT teams who teargassed the building. The EDC warehouse was used as a triage to treat injuries from either side and Route 87 was clogged with emergency response vehicles attempting to reach the center to treat injuries. The protest began at 11:00 AM and continued well into the next day. Although no demands were made prior to the riot, Craven stated that prisoners were unhappy with food service, hobby and crafts, and dental care. It was estimated that 400 of the 910 inmates participated in the riot. At least thirteen inmates, two SWAT team members, and one warden were injured, with eight being hospitalized.

Following the riot, over 120 incarcerated undocumented immigrants who allegedly started the riot were transferred to other federal prisons, and were waiting for deportation. Damages to the facility were declared minimal, as most of the fighting took place outside of the complex. Four inmates, Enrique Perez-Munoz, Gilberto Garcia-Lua, Juan Balenzuela-Galaviz, and Ramon Inzunza-Sandoval, were all formally charged with aggravated assault with a deadly weapon as a result of their actions during the riots. Prior to the riot, they had stockpiled over 16,000 pounds of rocks and had thrown multiple thousands of them during the altercation with SWAT. Following the riot, a select number of inmates alleged that they had been abused by prison guards, including being sodomized with night sticks.

==== Gang riots ====
After over five years of tranquility, another riot took place in the prison on 13 March 2001 when members from two rival gang groups butted heads. One inmate was hospitalized with a laceration to the head. Two inmates, Juan Maldonado-Hernandez and Miguel Martinez-Lopez, were found guily of assaulting guard Tommy Jackson during the riot. On top of their then-current sentences, a judge added 10 years to their incarceration for the assault.

Another fight following on 1 May 2003 where a 30-minute fight ensued, causing 11 prisoners to be sent to the hospital for injuries.

==== Dormitory B riots ====
Another riot occurred nearly seven years later on 12 April 2010 after the prisoners of Dormitory B refused to return to their cells. An overnight riot took place, and law enforcement was summoned and used 'chemical agents' to enforce compliance among the prisoners. No major injuries were reported.

== Historical population ==
Date	Population
2 February 1986	<200
7 July 1987	164
19 June 1988	~350
24 May 1989	~430
6 March 1991	479
21 August 1995	910
23 March 2006	~1,400
21 August 2016	1,370
