= Cumberland County Jail =

Jail in Portland, Maine, United States

- Interactive map of Cumberland County Jail
- Location: 50 County Way, Portland, Maine 04102; 43°39′04″N 70°16′54″W
- Status: Operational
- Capacity: 600
- Opened: 1994
- Closed: N/A
- Managed by: Cumberland County Sheriff's Office
- Director: Sheriff Kevin J. Joyce

The Cumberland County Jail is located in Portland, Maine, and is the largest jail in the state. The jail, a division of the Cumberland County Sheriff's Office, is a part of Cumberland County government and is wholly operated by the elected Sheriff. In 2002 it became the first jail in the state of Maine to receive national accreditation from the American Correctional Association, at the time putting it among only 4% of adult correctional facilities in the US to have been so accredited. It has the capacity to accommodate 600 inmates, and employs over 200 staff (including 130 Corrections Officers). Most inmates are serving short sentences or awaiting trial.

The modern cell blocks of the county jail.
