= Rio Grande Detention Center =

Federal detention center in Texas, US

Coordinates: 27°22′40″N 99°29′22″W

- Interactive map of Rio Grande Detention Center
- Location: 1001 San Rio Blvd Laredo, Texas
- Status: open
- Security class: mixed
- Capacity: 1900
- Opened: 2008
- Managed by: GEO Group

Rio Grande Detention Center is a privately owned prison for men located in Laredo, Webb County, Texas, operated by GEO Group under contract with the U.S. government Office of the Federal Detention Trustee. The prison was originally built in 2007, opened in 2008, and has an official capacity of 1900 federal detainees awaiting trial.

The facility stands about 500 feet from the Rio Grande.

As of August 2025 the facility is also called the "Rio Grande Processing Center" among the currently active list of ICE detention facilities.
