= LaSalle Corrections =

U.S. private prison corporation

LaSalle Corrections is a privately held private prison corporation, founded by Billy McConnell in 1997. As of 2020, it operated 18 prisons in Georgia, Louisiana, and Texas, capable of holding 13,000 prisoners.

LaSalle's first prison was the women's unit of the Richland Parish Detention Center, in Mangham, Louisiana, built in 1997. Richland was financed by two teams of investors, one let by Billy McConnell and the other by pharmacist Doug White. Like Richland, many of LaSalle's prisons are operated under the aegis of a Louisiana parish (equivalent to counties elsewhere in the United States) and its sheriff's department. State and federal funding for housing inmates has become an important part of parish revenue.

During the first Trump administration, LaSalle rapidly expanded into migrant detention, opening six new facilities for the purpose. As of 2020, it operated 13 migrant detention facilities, six in Louisiana, one in Georgia, one in Arizona, and five in Texas.

In April 2025, several LaSalle facilities under contract with U.S. Immigration and Customs Enforcement (ICE) were reported to be exceeding their contractual capacity limits, including the San Luis Regional Detention Center; Richwood Correctional Center; Winn Correctional Center; and the Prairieland Detention Center.

LaSalle's facilities include:

Arizona

- San Luis Regional Detention Center

Georgia

- Irwin County Detention Center

Louisiana

- Catahoula Correctional Center
- Jackson Parish Correctional Center
- Richland Parish Detention Center
- Richwood Correctional Center
- River Correctional Center
- Winn Correctional Center

Texas

- Bowie County Correctional Center (2010–21)
- Prairieland Detention Center
- Rolling Plains Detention Center
- West Texas Detention Facility
- Willacy County Regional Detention Center

== See also ==
- 2025 Prairieland ICE detention center incident
