= Immigration detention in the United States =

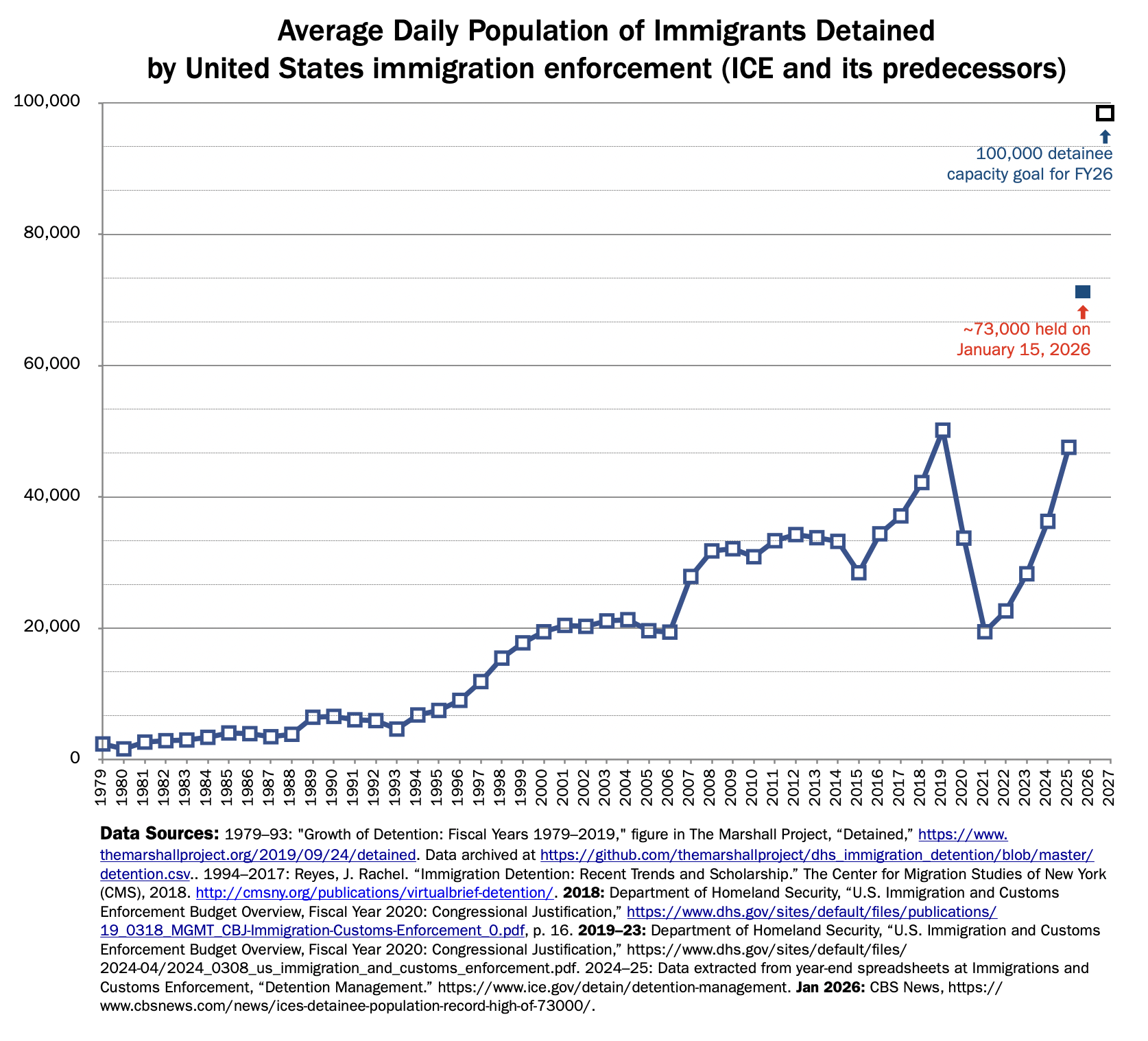
Average daily population of detained immigrants held by the United States government for the fiscal years 1979-2026

The United States government detains immigrants under the control of Customs and Border Protection (CBP; principally the Border Patrol) and Immigration and Customs Enforcement (ICE).

According to the Global Detention Project, the United States possesses the largest immigration detention system in the world. As of 2020, ICE detains immigrants in over 200 detention facilities, in state and local jails, in juvenile detention centers, and in shelters. Immigrants may be detained for unlawful/illegal entry to the United States, when their claims for asylum are received (and prior to release into the United States by parole), during the process of immigration proceedings, undergoing removal from the country, or if they are subject to mandatory detention.

During Fiscal Year 2023, 273,220 people were booked into ICE custody. As of FY 2023, the daily average population of non-citizens being detained by ICE was 28,289, however, at the end of the same fiscal year there was a total of 36,845 noncitizens being currently detained. In addition, as of April 2024, roughly 7,000 immigrant children are housed by facilities under the supervision of the Office of Refugee Resettlement's (ORR) program for Unaccompanied Children (UC). For the FY 2023, the ORR reported 118,938 unaccompanied children referrals from DHS to be processed into the UC program. Detention and deportations greatly increased during the second presidency of Donald Trump. By January 2026, the administration would have deported more than 370,000 immigrants.

In mid-February 2026, Reuters reported that in the previous few months, over 400 federal judges had ruled that ICE had illegally detained people a total of 4,421 times, and according to Department of Homeland Security Assistant Secretary Trica McLaughlin, that "President Trump and Secretary Noem were now enforcing the law and arresting illegal aliens who have no right to be in our country and reversed Biden's 'catch and release' policy." The report also stated that thousands of federal court petitions were filed challenging detention, with Reuters reporting more than 20,200 Habeas corpus cases since the president took office.

== History ==
Immigration detention in the United States had from 1855 an early facility at Castle Clinton on Manhattan (together with the Marine Hospital on Staten Island for quarantine) and relocated in the 1890s to Ellis Island. It was used as a permanent holding facility for foreign nationals throughout the Second World War, but fell into disuse in the 1950s. In the 1980s, Ronald Reagan reacted to the mass migration of asylum seekers arriving in boats from Haiti by establishing a program to interdict them (i.e. stop and search certain vessels suspected of transporting undocumented Haitians). As the number of illegal immigrants who were fleeing economic and political conditions increased, President Bush Sr attempted to find a regional location to handle the influx. The United Nations High Commissioner for Refugees arranged for several countries in the region—Belize, Honduras, Trinidad and Tobago, and Venezuela—to temporarily provide a safe haven for Haitians, however the Coast Guard was quickly overwhelmed, and by November 18, 1991, the United States forcibly returned 538 Haitians to Haiti. These options also proved inadequate for the sheer numbers of Haitians fleeing their country, and the Coast Guard took them to the U.S. naval base in Guantanamo, Cuba, where they were pre-screened for asylum in the United States.

In 2003, the U.S. Immigration and Customs Enforcement agency (ICE) was created under the Department of Homeland Security. ICE enforces the United States' immigration and customs laws, with the primary role of using investigative techniques to apprehend and detain those suspected of violating them. The Office of Enforcement and Removal Operations (ERO), housed within ICE, carries out "the immigration enforcement process, including the identification, arrest, detention and removal of noncitizens who are subject to removal or are unlawfully present in the U.S."

== Process of detention and removal ==
Detained immigrants are given a unique identifying number called an Alien Registration Number ("A-number"), provided they do not already have one by virtue of their legal alien status, and are sent to a county, state, federal, or private prison, where they remain until deported or released after proceedings.

=== Office of Enforcement and Removal Operations ===
There were four divisions within ICE which work to investigate illegal immigration, enforce immigration laws, and detain and deport offenders of these laws: Enforcement and Removal Operations (ERO), the Office of Investigations (OI), the Office of Intelligence (Intel), and the Office of International Affairs (OIA). ERO is the division that deals directly with the detention of immigrants. ERO, under ICE, operates eight detention centers, termed "Service Processing Centers," in Aguadilla, Puerto Rico; Batavia, New York; El Centro, California; El Paso, Texas; Florence, Arizona; Miami, Florida; Los Fresnos, Texas; and San Pedro, California. ICE also has contracts with seven private companies that run facilities in Aurora, Colorado; Houston, Texas; Laredo, Texas; Tacoma, Washington; Elizabeth, New Jersey; Queens, New York; and San Diego, California. Other facilities that house immigrant detainees include juvenile detention centers and shelters. However, the majority of immigrants are detained in state and local jails, which have contracts with ICE. At the end of the 2007 fiscal year the United States' immigration detention system comprised 961 sites.

As of 2025, ICE had the following 4 divisions, now called directorates: Enforcement and Removal Operations (ERO), Homeland Security Investigations (HSI), Office of the Principal Legal Advisor (OPLA) and Management and Administration (M&A).

=== Secure Communities ===
In 2007, the program, Secure Communities, was created within ICE to identify criminal aliens, prioritize them based on the severity of the crimes that they committed, and transform the processes necessary to remove them by increasing efficiency. Secure Communities identifies illegal immigrants with the use of modern technology, notably biometric identification techniques. These were first employed in Houston, Texas in 2008. As of April 2011, the Secure Communities' biometric sharing capability is being used in 1,210 of 3,181 jurisdictions (state, county, and local jails and prisons) in the U.S. Between 2008, when the program was started, through March 2011, 140,396 convicted criminal aliens have been booked into ICE custody resulting in 72,445 deportations. Under the Secure Communities program, the fingerprints of everyone arrested and booked are not only checked against FBI criminal history records, but they are also checked against DHS immigration records. If fingerprints match DHS records, ICE determines whether immigration-enforcement action is required, considering the immigration status of the alien, the severity of the crime, and the alien's criminal history. ICE then places a detainer on the individual, which is a request that the jail hold that person for up to 48 hours beyond their scheduled release, so that ICE can come to interview or to possibly take them into custody.

The Obama administration has been a big proponent of the program, expanding it from 14 jurisdictions under President George Bush to over 1,210 jurisdictions as of March 2011. ICE plans to expand the program nationwide by 2013.

In a memo dated November 20, 2014, Department of Homeland Security Secretary Jeh Johnson discontinued the Secure Communities program. On January 25, 2017, the Secure Communities program was restarted by the Department of Homeland Security per an executive order signed by President Donald Trump.

=== Section 287(g) ===
The enactment of the Illegal Immigration Reform and Immigrant Responsibility Act of 1996 added onto the Immigration and Nationality Act a clause, titled Section 287(g), which allows state and local law enforcement officials to enforce federal immigration law on the condition that they are trained and monitored by ICE. This agreement in practice permits local and state enforcement officials to arrest and even detain individuals they encounter during their day-to-day duties if they suspect them to be or "identify" them as illegal immigrants. However, individuals picked up by local law enforcement may have committed minor offenses, such as driving infractions, and lacked proper identification when stopped. Many civil rights groups have accused Section 287(g) of permitting or causing racial profiling.

=== Detention at the border ===
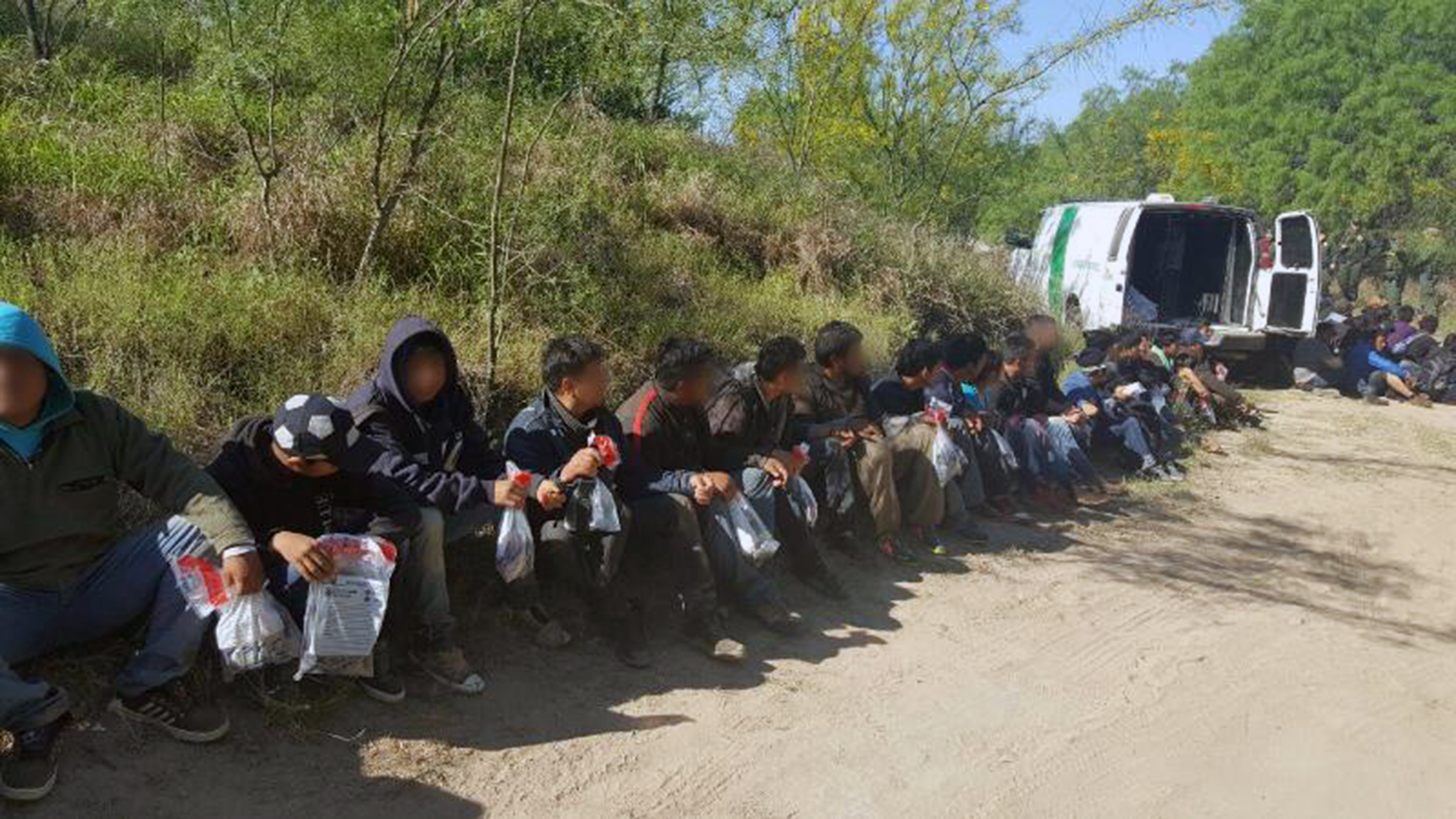
Immigrants apprehended by Rio Grande Valley CBP Agents, 2016

Often, illegal aliens or individuals lacking legal permission to enter, or remain, in the United States, when apprehended at the U.S. border are detained and placed in removal proceedings in front of an immigration judge. These individuals may include refugees seeking asylum. Under Section 235(b)(2) of the Immigration and Nationality Act, if an individual stopped at the border is believed to be an illegal immigrant or a threat to national security, they are considered "inadmissible" and classified as an "arriving alien." Individuals detained at the border are only released on a case-to-case basis by the authority of ICE officials.

Immigration detention facilities are required to uphold many of the same standards maintained by domestic detention facilities as well as international human rights laws and protocols. Facility officials are prohibited from violating the Eighth Amendment in the utilization of force to cause harm to inmates. The U.S. government has ratified the International Covenant on Civil and Political Rights, the Convention on the Elimination of All Forms of Racial Discrimination, and Convention Against Torture and Other Cruel, Inhuman or Degrading Treatment or Punishment in regards to immigration detention facilities, all of which provide standards and protocols that must be administered and followed in the treatment of immigrant detainees. This includes the proper administration of medical treatment as well as swift response to medical requests by detainees. There have been reports that some facilities utilize punitive disciplinary action that violate the Convention Against Torture and International Covenant on Civil and Political Rights protocols and that abuse by facility officials is not limited to excessive punitive action. The ACLU has reported that complaints of physical, sexual, and verbal abuse by officials are not at all uncommon and state that there seems to be a pronounced lack of response and record keeping of detainee complaints by facility officials. While immigration detention facilities are required to uphold many of the same standards maintained by domestic detention facilities, the biggest discrepancy is in legal representation. Immigrants are not guaranteed a right to due process, but can hire attorneys to handle portions of their casework at cost.

=== Mandatory detention ===
Mandatory detention of 'criminal aliens' was officially authorized by President Bill Clinton in 1996, with the enactment of the Antiterrorism and Effective Death Penalty and the Illegal Immigration Reform and Immigrant Responsibility acts. These acts increased the use of mandatory detention by expanding definitions of crimes of "moral turpitude" and "aggravated felony" and requiring detention and removal of these individuals based on those grounds. From 1996 to 1998, the number of immigrants in detention increased from 8,500 to 16,000 and by 2008 this number increased to more than 30,000.

After being picked up by ICE officials, either at the border, through Secure Communities, or by local officials by way of Section 287(g), an individual can be released on bond if they are not deemed a "threat" to national security. However, many are put in mandatory detention due to criminal history. The enactment of Antiterrorism and Effective Death Penalty and Illegal Immigration Reform and Immigrant Responsibility acts subjected a wider range of individuals to mandatory detention, including, "non-violent misdemeanor convictions without any jail sentence, and anyone considered a national security or terrorist risk." In addition, if an individual is already in the U.S., they will be put in mandatory detention if suspected of being a threat to national security or charged with two crimes of "moral turpitude," an "aggravated felony," a firearms offense, or a controlled substance violation. Thus, crimes that did not assign jail time to the individual may subject them to mandatory detention. The ACLU has condemned this practice, saying that it violates due process and is inefficient and costly, since individuals who do not pose a threat to national security but have a criminal record are often the ones subjected to mandatory detention.

Because the Immigration and Nationality Act and federal court case decisions mandate ICE to carry out a post order custody review of all individuals slated for deportation, when they are held in detention for more than ninety days, to reassess whether or not the individual is a threat to national security or can be released.

On April 16, 2019, U.S. Attorney General William Barr ruled that asylum seekers who are in detention and have shown they have a credible fear of returning to their countries are not able to have a judge grant them bond. Judge Marsha J. Pechman of United States District Court for the Western District of Washington effectively blocked the implementation of the policy before it was able to take effect on July 15, 2019, filing an injunction in a class-action lawsuit on behalf of migrants and their advocates.

=== Deportation ===
Deportation occurs after illegal immigrants are brought before an immigration judge in removal proceedings and the judge either issues a warrant of removal or reinstates prior orders of deportation/removal. Removal proceedings are conducted by the Department of Justice-Executive Office for Immigration Review.

In July 2019, the Trump administration implemented a broader scope of "expedited removal" of migrants apprehended at the border to allow immigration officials to deport on a quicker time table. The broader scope limited the ability to challenge deportation claims, unless an illegal immigrant could prove they had lived in the United States for more than two years. Pro-immigrant and legal groups, such as the American Civil Liberties Union vowed to sue. However, the Supreme Court eventually approved the "fast-tracked" deportations of illegal immigrants, leaving little recourse to state who challenged the expansion of deportations.

== Detention centers ==
Immigration detention centers are managed by three agencies: Customs and Border Protection, Immigration and Customs Enforcement, and the Office of Refugee Resettlement.

=== CBP processing and detention centers ===
Customs and Border Protection directly detains immigrants at the border and ports of entry. Facilities are designed for brief detention stays, after which migrants are usually turned over to Immigration and Customs Enforcement, or in the case of parent–child pairs and other children, to the Office of Refugee Resettlement. Under standard procedures, this detention should not exceed 72 hours, but in mid-2019, the average length of detention exceeded one week.

During the first half of 2019, the number of arriving immigrants on the U.S.–Mexico border increased greatly over prior years. The number of migrants held in CBP custody surged to 13,400 on March 27, 2019. In May and June 2019, between 14,000 and 18,000 people were held by CBP each night. On a press call, a Customs and Border Protection Commissioner McAleenan stated that, "A high number for us is 4,000. A crisis level is 6,000. 13,000 is unprecedented."

CBP detention facilities include the El Paso Del Norte Processing Center in El Paso, Texas, the "Ursula" Central Processing Center and Donna tent facility in McAllen, Texas, and the Border Patrol Station in Clint, Texas. During the 2019 surge in migrant arrivals, many CBP facilities held inmates in numbers far exceeding their planned capacities. Border Patrol agents converted numerous rooms and outdoor spaces into temporary holding facilities. The Department of Homeland Security's Office of Inspector General (OIG) reported that "the El Paso Del Norte Processing Center … does not have the capacity to hold the hundreds currently in custody safely, and has held the majority of its detainees longer than the 72 hours generally permitted." CBP facilities have been the sites of communicable infections including chicken pox, scabies, influenza, and lice.

Detainees are transferred multiple times or circular in order to retaliate, labor traffick or even torture. From January 2020 to May 2022 there were 14,000 domestic shuffle or intra-detention ICE air flights.

=== Privatization ===
Many of the detention centers housing immigrants are operated by private corporations who have contracts with ICE. The privatized model of detention, which is common within the United States' prison system, has raised several concerns. Without the government being directly involved, human rights abuses can go unmonitored and be difficult to uncover. The privatization model is based on profit maximization, meaning that more detainees result in more money for the private companies contracted to operate these facilities. While a cost-benefit argument is used to vouch for privatization, an attorney from the ACLU has stated, "It's much more expensive to detain people rather than supervise them to ensure that they appear for their removal proceedings and for deportation if necessary."

Several politicians have attempted to end or alter the terms of privatization. In 2015, Rep. Raul Grijalva introduced the Justice Is Not For Sale Act. Co-sponsored by thirty other Democrats, the bill aimed to effectively eliminate private detention centers and transfer their operation over to the federal government. Among some of the current complaints addressed in the bill were the cost of phone calls, which the bill required be capped, and to allow multiple telecommunication companies to provide phone service.

Rep. Adam Smith of Washington introduced a bill in 2015 entitled the Accountability in Immigration Detention Act (H.R. 2314). The bill highlights detention facility standards and oversight for the facilities. More specifically, it calls on for the Secretary of Homeland Security to enforce these standards for detention facilities. Items of concern include the cost of telephone calls, prevention of sexual abuse and harassment, and limiting the use of solitary confinement. It also contains suggestions of alternatives to detention. The bill maintains that the use of these alternatives would be left to the discretion of the Department of Homeland Security. It was referred to three committees, including the Committee on Homeland Security.

To address the controversial use of quotas in these detention centers, Rep. Theodore Deutch introduced the Protecting Taxpayers and Communities from Local Detention Quotas Act in 2015 (H.R.2808). The bill targets bed quotas used by private companies and demands the U.S. Immigration and Customs Enforcement refuse them in contracts and contract extensions. It had 9 cosponsors, including Rep. Adam Smith and Rep. Raul Grijalva. After its introduction, it was sent to the Committee on the Judiciary in July 2015.

These governmental contracts with detention facilities have not only gained profit for private companies, but also for the cities and counties that house immigrants in their detention centers. In 2008, ICE spent $55.2 million on detaining immigrants at thirteen jails in California and roughly $57 million in 2009. For many cities and counties across the country, immigration detention has been a lucrative business that provides much needed revenue. Santa Ana's Police Chief, Paul Walters, stated, "We treat [the jail] as a business," in reference to a proposed plan to convert rooms at the local jail into a site for detained immigrants.

In 2017, Donald Trump signed an executive order to expand the Mexico–United States border wall and increase the building of detention centers. A memo from top Homeland Security officials published in 2017 outlined the goal to detain 85,000 illegal immigrants per day. Private prison companies have benefitted from Trump's strict stance on detainable immigrants because they are paid per inmate per day. GEO Group and CoreCivic, the two largest private prison companies, are known financial supporters of Trump's campaign. Both GEO Group and CoreCivic have released statements in support of Trump's new policies.

The Varick Federal Detention Facility in Manhattan is one of these privatized detention centers. The Varick facility is managed by Ahtna Technical Services, Inc., an Alaskan corporation that hires a subcontractor to provide guards, transportation, and equipment used at the center. In 2009, ICE proposed the construction of an immigration detention center outside of Los Angeles, which would be operated by a private corporation.

People previously held in private detention centers have also sued over private prison's work programs to seek damages. GEO Group, the second largest private prison company in the United States, has been found to only pay workers in their programs one dollar a day—or less, while also punishing detainees who refuse with solitary confinement. Professor Jackie Stevens of Northwestern University's Deportation Research Clinic obtained documents that highlighted the financial troubles as a result of these lawsuits. Because of these suits, GEO Group asked the federal government for repayment over unexpected costs of running these private detention centers. In March 2018, 18 Republican members of Congress sent a letter to Attorney General Jeff Sessions, claiming these low paying work programs—with threat of solitary confinement -- "improve detainees morale."

In June 2025, the Federal Government promised to reimburse the state of Florida US$608 million in expenses, many billed by private companies for a detention center in the Everglades. A standing 2023 immigration "state of emergency" was invoked to seize a county-owned airfield and fast-track construction without the usual environmental reviews or collaboration with local officials. The Florida Division of Emergency Management and the governor's office bypassed procurement and competitive bidding rules and selected IRG Global Emergency Management, who had given $10,000 to Florida's Republican Party on June 24, 2025, for a $1.1 million contract for "operational support services in support of migration efforts in the State," followed by two more contracts with Florida, totaling over $5 million. IRG is an offshoot of Access Restoration Services US, Inc., a major campaign donor to Republicans.

=== Conditions ===
While the United States Constitution provides convicted individuals with legal advice, free of charge if they cannot afford an attorney, immigrants are not guaranteed this right. Instead, they must pay for a lawyer, an option most detained immigrants cannot afford. While immigration courts are required to supply detainees with a list of pro-bono lawyers and agencies that provide legal advice, many of those on the list only represent specific types of immigrants, i.e., asylum seekers or individuals who are not detained. While ICE detention standards state that detainees are provided with access to law libraries, allotted a handbook discussing immigration detention, and given a presentation on their legal rights, these actions are often not carried out in practice.

The American Civil Liberties Union, while recognizing that ICE implemented important standards and regulations, publicized criticisms, including that ICE does not require the latest PBNDS standards at all detention facilities. The ACLU also condemns ICE's practice of allowing immigrants to be held in "short term" facilities that do not possess basic needs such as beds, water, and toothbrushes, and for over-incarcerating immigrants who are not a flight risk, and thus do not need to be detained.

On January 18, 2019, Kirkland & Ellis attorney Sarah Fabian, senior counsel to the Department of Justice, argued, before a panel of three judges of the United States Court of Appeals for the Ninth Circuit, in San Francisco, that toothbrushes and soap were not required elements of "safe and sanitary conditions" for the "shorter stays" of children in ICE detention.

Several cases of abuse in immigration detention centers have been cited by sources including Amnesty International, the ACLU, the Los Angeles Times and The New York Times. In 2009, the Los Angeles Times reported on one such instance of abuse, endured by a detainee named Luiz Enrique Guzman at the private Stewart Detention Center in Lumpkin, Georgia, who stated, "the conditions [were] "terrible"...the center staff frequently violated his civil rights" and that "he was beaten while in detention and placed in segregation because he worked to organize detainees." The New York Times reported "recurrent complaints include[ing] frigid temperatures, mildew and meals that leave detainees hungry and willing to clean for $1 a day to pay for commissary food" at the Varick Federal Detention Facility in Manhattan. In addition, individuals in immigration detention centers are often placed in custody with violent offenders, even though illegal immigration is a civil, not criminal, matter. As of January 10, 2010 there have been 107 deaths of immigrants in detention since 2003, when ICE was created. ICE has been accused of covering up many of these deaths, like that of Boubacar Bah, an immigrant from Guinea who was placed in isolation for thirteen hours after suffering from a skull fracture and eventually died in custody. Another immigrant who died in ICE detention was Hiu Lui Ng, whose fractured spine and cancer had gone undiagnosed. In fact, officials at the Donald W. Wyatt Detention Facility in Central Falls, Rhode Island accused him of lying about his situation and denied him medical care. Francisco Castaneda was an immigrant detained at a facility in California who was similarly denied care – a biopsy for a penile lesion – and ended up dying from cancer. ICE responded by publicizing a list of deaths from 2003-2013 that have occurred in its detention centers, performing a review of its facilities, and issuing a renewed set of standards to be followed in detention.

=== Infectious diseases ===
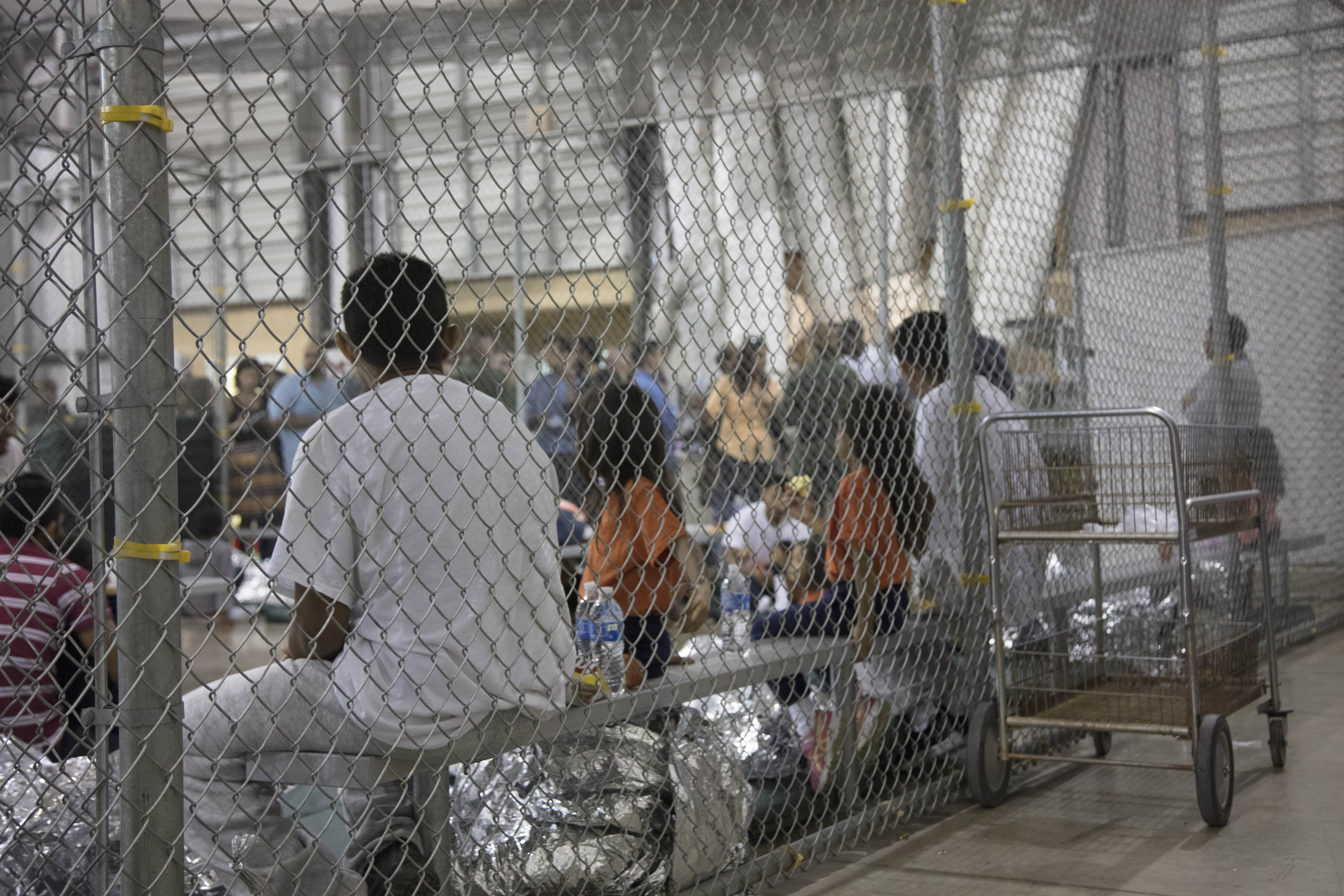
Ursula detention center in the United States

Immigration detention centers in the United States have been identified as environments that may facilitate the transmission of infectious diseases due to overcrowding, limited sanitation, and restricted access to medical care. High population density and shared living spaces increase the risk of respiratory infections, including influenza and COVID-19, particularly in facilities where physical distancing is difficult to maintain.

Screening and prevention practices for infectious diseases vary across detention facilities. Although initial medical evaluations are typically conducted upon intake, these screenings may not include testing for certain conditions such as parasitic infections, including Strongyloides, or other soil-transmitted helminths. In addition, testing for sexually transmitted and blood-borne infections such as HIV and hepatitis B and C may depend on self-disclosure of risk factors, which can limit detection, particularly among vulnerable populations.

Structural limitations within detention facilities may further contribute to delays in diagnosis and treatment. Reports have documented cases in which a single medical provider was responsible for the care of more than 100 detainees, including children, reducing the capacity for timely medical intervention. In some facilities, a single advanced practice provider has been reported to oversee the care of up to 125 detained children, highlighting constraints in medical capacity.

Public health experts have raised concerns regarding inconsistent infection control practices and the potential implications for both detainees and surrounding communities.

Frequent population turnover in detention facilities, including transfers between centers and new arrivals, may also contribute to the introduction and spread of infectious diseases within these settings.

==== Health screening and medical oversight ====
Medical screening practices in immigration detention facilities have been the subject of public health concern. Although detainees typically receive an initial medical evaluation upon intake, these screenings may be limited in scope and may not include testing for certain conditions such as parasitic infections, anemia, or lead exposure. In some cases, testing for infectious diseases may depend on self-reported risk factors, which may result in underdiagnosis among detainee populations.

Concerns have also been raised regarding ongoing medical monitoring within detention facilities. After initial screening, access to medical care may be limited, and detainees may receive follow-up treatment only when symptoms become severe enough to be identified by staff. Reports examining detention systems have identified delays in diagnosis and treatment, as well as limitations in healthcare staffing and resources. These factors may affect the ability of detention facilities to provide timely and comprehensive medical care.

== Criticisms ==
'Results of an Unannounced Inspection of Winn Correctional Center in Winnfield, Louisiana' - published by the Office of inspector general on June 2, 2026. Multiple violations including food spoilage were found at the facility.

=== Human rights ===
Several human rights organizations, including Amnesty International and the American Civil Liberties Union (ACLU), and a series of reports made by The New York Times have cited concerns with ICE's management of these detention centers. Reports refer to instances of human rights abuse and inadequate or unprofessional medical care in these detention facilities. Such reports have also publicized the death of several immigrants in detention and have accused ICE of covering up this information. ICE, in response, has released a list of 166 people who died under ICE detention between 2003–2016. ICE has publicly stated that the agency provides "state-of-the-art medical care" and "do[es] everything possible to maintain the best quality of life for the detainees in…custody." In May 2008 the Detainee Basic Medical Care Act of 2008 (H.R. 5950) was introduced to the United States Congress by Representative Zoe Lofgren (D-CA), though no further steps have been taken to enact the bill.

In addition to their condemnation of the conditions at immigration detention centers, various human rights groups and news sources have also criticized the high costs necessary to sustain ICE's detention infrastructure. ICE's annual budget is roughly $2.5 billion for its detention and deportation duties. President Obama's fiscal year 2017 budget request would reduce the bed quota to 30,913 detention beds: 29,953 adult beds at an average rate of $126.46 per day and 960 family beds at an average rate of $161.36 per day. Through fiscal year 2016, the bed quota remains at 34,000.

It has been reported that only a small percentage of the population of detained immigrants have committed crimes. However, of the 32,000 immigrants in ICE detention on January 25, 2009, 18,690 had no criminal convictions, including illegal entry.

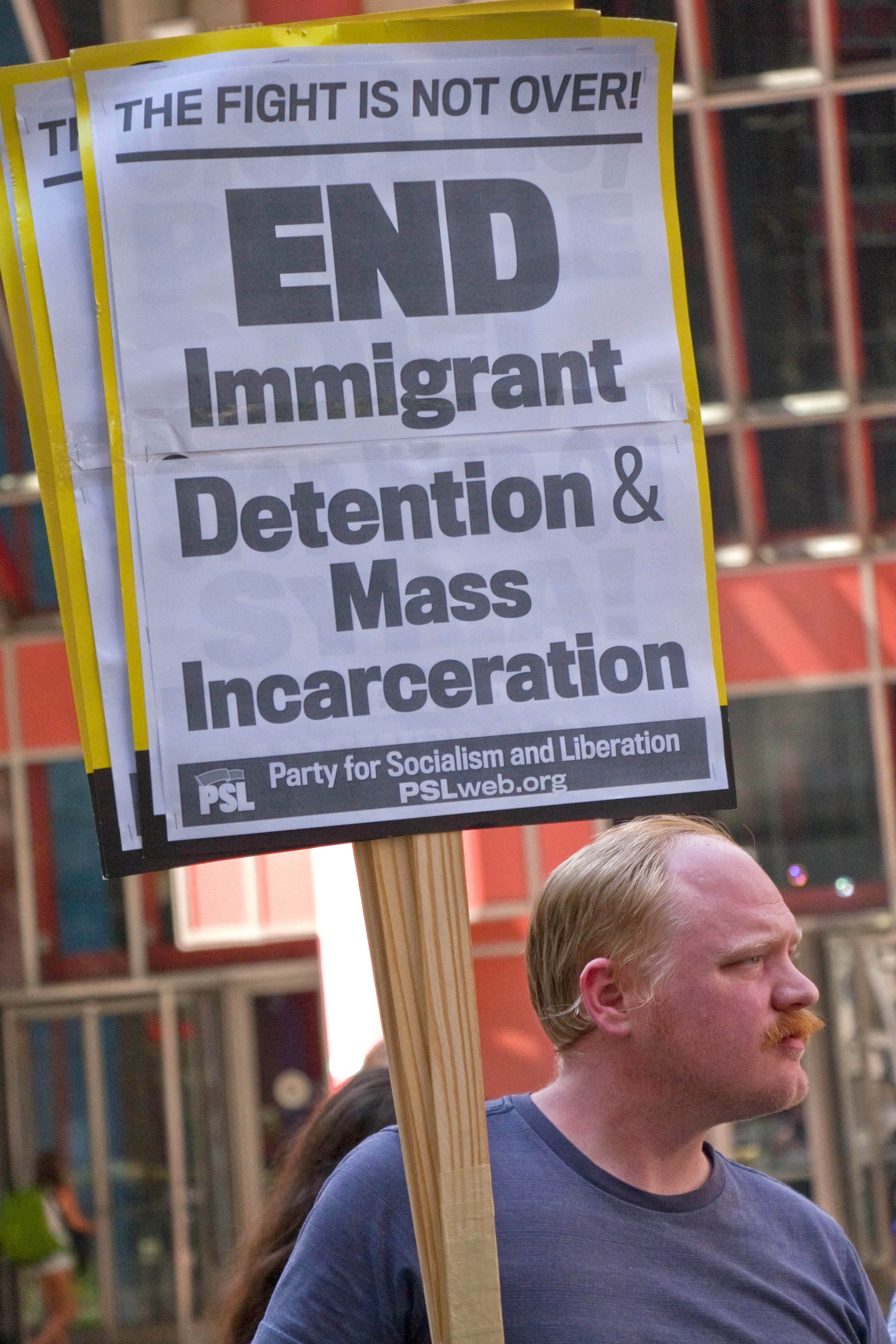
Protest against immigration detention in 2018

Protests by detained immigrants have taken place at several facilities, including the Varick Federal Detention Facility in Manhattan. One hundred detainees at the Varick site, all of whom had no criminal charges, sent a petition in October 2008 to the New York City Bar Association detailing human rights abuses and substandard conditions and asking for legal help. On January 19, 2010, detainees at the same site initiated a hunger strike against the conditions of detention. The strike was broken up by a SWAT team that allegedly "used pepper spray and "beat up" some detainees, took many to segregation cells as punishment and transferred about 17 to immigration jails in other states." In response to the report, the New York City Bar Justice Center began the NYC Know Your Rights Project. This initiative combines the efforts of the City Bar Justice Center, the Legal Aid Society and the New York chapter of the American Immigration Lawyers Association with the goal of providing more pro bono legal help specifically at the Varick detention center. Many detainees are left without legal council at the Varick Facility and at other detention center because their cases are considered civil and not criminal. In these civil cases, defendants must pay for legal counsel. The Bar's Justice Center found that very few detainees could afford such help. Similarly, the Columbia Law Review states that in general most detainees do not have legal representation in their court cases. A report found that the lack of legal aid to detainees threatens the legitimacy and fairness of the court system and the efficiency of the courts themselves. For detainees without legal aid, the decisions of the court on a case are more likely to be incorrect or unjust, according to the report. Many detainees do not get legal aid because, apart from financial issues, they often are transferred to other detention centers without giving alert to family, legal representation or advocacy network. Centers can be rural and isolated, located where legal aid, representation and other forms of advocacy can be inaccessible.

Similarly, the detainees were denied access to adequate healthcare in detention facilities. In a report by Project South and Penn State Law titled "Imprisoned Justice," it is evident that the two detention centers in Georgia, Stewart Detention Center and Irwin County Detention Center, were recommended to shut down because they both not only violated Immigration and Customs Enforcement guidelines but also the office of the United Nations High Commissioner for Refugees guideline. According to these guidelines, every detainee must receive a full medical evaluation at intake but some reported that they had never seen the medical staff. The report demonstrated that the healthcare problems in these centers were easily ignored because the detainees were not aware of their rights in these facilities. Allegations of forced hysterectomies taking place at the Irwin facility have also been made.

The spring of 2017 brought a new change in child separation policies to ICE detention centers in the United States with the transition from the Obama to Trump administrations. This "zero-tolerance" policy changed the way the courts prosecuted illegal immigrants crossing the border, according to Professor Jackie Stevens of Northwestern University's Deportation Research Clinic. Instead handing out civil charges for those apprehended crossing the border, U.S. Attorney General Jeff Sessions changed the prosecution statute to a criminal misdemeanor, leading to large numbers of illegal immigrant children to be separated from their families. However, after litigations, a judicial order was handed down by the courts to begin to reunite families who had been separated during that period. In August 2019, the American Civil Liberties Union and U.S. Justice Department found that more than 500 children who had been separated from their parents at the border have not been found, leading to concerns over the fate of these unaccounted minors.

ICE has also come under scrutiny over its methods to identify whether a detainee is an unaccompanied minor or an adult of 18-years-old or olderan unaccompanied minorre used to assess molar size to evaluate age, but this method has proven unreliable. Dental radiographs only give an approximate age, within a few years. But evaluating by molars means there could be ambiguity over a detainee being a minor or an adult. When these discrepancies arose, ICE systematically put the individual's age at the oldest year possible, in order to move them to detention facilities, rather than child care units. Child care units are much more expensive to maintain than detention facilities for undocumented adults. This American Life, a WBEZ Chicago radio show, highlighted Yong Xiong's journey through detention facilities, as dental radiographs claimed she was still a child, even though she was 19-years-old.

=== International regulation regarding human rights ===
United States Immigration Detention Facilities are required to uphold many of the same standards maintained by domestic detention facilities as well as international human rights laws and protocols. Facility officials are prohibited from violating the Eighth Amendment in the utilization of force to cause harm to inmates. The U.S. government has ratified the International Covenant on Civil and Political Rights, the Convention on the Elimination of All Forms of Racial Discrimination, and Convention Against Torture and Other Cruel, Inhuman or Degrading Treatment or Punishment in regards to immigration detention facilities, all of which provide standards and protocols that must be administered and followed in the treatment of immigrant detainees. This includes the proper administration of medical treatment as well as swift response to medical requests by detainees. The United States is also bound by the United Nations' Universal Declaration on Human Rights codified in 1948 and the Universal Declaration of Human Rights, both of which swift and adequate response to all medical requests and emergencies. Despite these standards as well as the purpose of immigration detention not being punitive, facilities often utilize punitive disciplinary action that violate the Convention Against Torture and the International Covenant on Civil and Political Rights protocols. However, abuse by facility officials is not limited to excessive punitive action. Complaints of physical, sexual, and verbal abuse by officials are not at all uncommon. Furthermore, there seems to be a pronounced lack of response and record keeping of detainee complaints by facility officials. Detainees are protected via international law through several articles within various treaties in which the United States is a signatory. For example, Article 12 of Convention Against Torture and Other Cruel, Inhuman or Degrading Treatment or Punishment states as follows:

Each State Party shall ensure that its competent authorities proceed to a prompt and impartial investigation, wherever there is reasonable ground to believe that an act of torture has been committed in any territory under its jurisdiction.

Violation of this specific article, along with a variety of other international codes that regulate the rights immigrant detainees, are unquestionably common within United States Immigration Detention Facilities. Similar to issues involving lack of response to medical requests and emergencies, immigration detention centers in the United States often violate international human rights codes in regards to lack of legal representation to those held in custody. Other international articles particularly relevant to immigration detention facilities are Article 2 of the Universal Declaration of Human Rights, which ensures all individuals of equal rights regardless of nationality and Article 9 of the International Covenant on Civil and Political Rights, which guarantees anyone who has been detained be promptly brought before a judge or other judicial power. Continued expansion of immigration detention will further the prevalence of international law violation if enforcement and reformation does not coincide alongside.

In December 2025, the report "Torture and Enforced Disappearances in the Sunshine State: Human Rights Violations at 'Alligator Alcatraz' and Krome in Florida" published by Amnesty International concluded that the camp's conditions, including routine and prolonged use of shackles and retention in a "box" described as a 2x2 foot cage-like structure "constitutes torture". Human rights organizations and legal experts claim the camp does not meet the minimum standards of human treatment required for persons detained under international law due to the declared absence of sanitary facilities, medical care and access to legal advice with potential violations of the International Covenant on Civil and Political Rights (ICCPR) and the United Nations Convention Against Torture (UNCAT).

==== Allegations of pork and expired meals served to Muslim detainees ====
In 2020, CNN reported that Muslim detainees at a federal immigration facility in Miami, Florida, were repeatedly served pork or pork-based products against their religious beliefs, according to claims made by immigrant advocates. There are dozens of Muslim detainees at the facility for whom it is religiously forbidden to consume pork, civil rights groups said in a letter to ICE and federal oversight agencies. The Muslim detainees at the Krome detention facility in Miami were forced to accept pork because religiously compliant/halal meals that ICE served had been consistently rotten and expired. In one instance, the Chaplain at Krome's allegedly dismissed pleas from Muslim detainees for help, saying, "It is what it is."

A letter by civil rights lawyers stated "Many have suffered illness, like stomach pains, vomiting, and diarrhea, as a result." A spokesman claimed that ICE did not deny any "reasonable and equitable opportunity for persons to observe their religious dietary practices". Representatives of the facility, including the chaplain did not respond to requests for comment. Previously in 2019, a Pakistani-born man with a valid American work permit was reportedly given nothing but pork sandwiches for six consecutive days.

=== International human rights violations ===
Since the United States Congress passed the Antiterrorism and Effective Death Penalty Act and the Illegal Immigration Reform and Immigrant Responsibility Act in 1996, the use of detention has become the U.S.'s primary enforcement strategy. This is evident by the drastic increase of people being detained, 2008 saw 230,000 detainees, which was three times the number of people being held in 1999. This overwhelming increase has been accompanied by a rise in violations of international law being committed by the United States against those being detained. Such violations include the handling of grievances, the medical care provided or lack thereof, and inhumane and/or degrading treatment shown towards detainees. Furthermore, detention policies have worked to disregard the sanctity of the family unit, violate the rights of refugees and asylum seekers, and ignore both domestic and international laws of due process.

The intent behind a grievance procedure is meant to keep detention officials in check and prevent their abuse of power. However, reports have shown that detainees have been denied the chance to file a grievance, and for those who are given the opportunity, it is often ignored or overlooked. This is a direct violation of international law as grievances are meant to be guaranteed to such individuals detained under international law.

Due process is arguably the most evident concern of immigrant detention violations. International law requires interpreters to be provided for cases of language barriers, however personal stories show that this procedure is not always followed. International law guarantees legal material and counsel, however, detainees are often denied such rights. The law libraries being offered to detainees lack sufficient material for individuals to make their own appeal. Access to the internet and to newspaper have often been denied as critical evidence can be found to support asylum claims surrounding news of their countries of origin. The inaccessibility of immigrant detention centers pose a problem as those who can afford counsel risk having meetings be delayed or cancelled. Lawyer-client confidentially is compromised as detention officers have been found to open mail. Cases have also shown that detainees are not offered private rooms away from officers for their meetings.

In the United States the detained immigrants, or natural born citizens are not given the right to counsel. The Sixth Amendment to the United States Constitution allows accused criminals to have full access to legal counsel, even if they cannot afford to pay for their own legal counsel. In many courts around the United States have yet to find that those who are not citizens in removal cases are able to use the Sixth Amendment which is their right to counsel. The criminalization of illegal immigrants, or accused U.S. citizens of being undocumented have not in most cases committed a crime coming to the U.S., but instead have committed a civil offense. A civil offense rarely leads a person to spend any amount of time incarcerated, and immigrants detained, or assumed to be in the United States illegally can be held for a short period of time, or for an extend time in most cases being withheld to have access to legal counsel.

International law requires that every individual subject to detention have adequate medical care. The United Nations' Universal Declaration on Human Rights was the first to record this universal right in 1984. Based on reports from legal advocacy groups, lack of access to adequate medical care has been the most common complaint made by detainees. It has been found that as many as 80% of detainees are dissatisfied with the medical care practices in place. Medical care has been ignored, inadequate, denied, and in some cases, inhumane.

Despite statements from the United Nations that detention of refugees should be avoided, the United States has often turned to detention as its primary mode of operation when determining asylum claims. Detention of asylum seekers violates Article 26 of the 1951 Convention on Refugees. This article indicates that asylum seekers are lawful in the United States, granting them freedom while their cases are being determined. Although United States was not officially a "party" in the 1951 Convention, it became a party in the subsequent amendment, the 1967 Protocol, meaning that the United States is obliged to adhere to the Convention. Unfortunately, the UNHCR has no enforcement, and individuals have no means to file complaints. The United States continues to violate international and domestic laws by detaining refugees before their status is determined.

Immigrant Detention in the United States: Violations of International Human Rights Law is a paper published on Human Rights Brief that investigates how the practice of detention violates international law within sectors previously outlined. Given the United States's impact on global affairs, implications of its violations to such international legal standards must be recognized. If detention centers continue to be run without the proper oversight, where officials are not held accountable to the standards of international and human rights law, it is likely that such violations will continue. International human rights laws shed light on the shortcomings of the current practice of detention centers, thus the United States must begin to look for alternatives that are in accordance with international human rights standards.

=== U.S. citizens in immigration detention ===
There have been numerous cases where U.S. citizens have been held in immigration detention. Data from Syracuse University's Transactional Records Access Clearinghouse shows that "detainers were mistakenly placed on 834 U.S. citizens and 28,489 permanent residents between 2008 and 2012." In one case, a man was held in immigration detention for more than three years. In some cases ICE has actually deported U.S. citizens, including native-born U.S. citizens, to other countries. One notorious case (Mark Lyttle) involved a North-Carolina born (and therefore U.S. citizen) man deported to Mexico. Another case involved the deportation of a 14-year-old girl, born in Dallas, Texas, and therefore a U.S. citizen, to Colombia. Although ICE claims to keep no official figures on the percentage of detainees who have a credible claim to U.S. citizenship, the American Civil Liberties Union estimates this percentage to be between one and four percent. ICE has no legal authority over U.S. citizens.

In January 2026, federal immigration agents in Columbia Heights, Minnesota detained a five-year-old Ecuadorian boy, Liam Conejo Ramos, with his father. Agents had the child knock on the family's door to check for occupants, a tactic a local school superintendent characterized as "essentially using a 5-year-old as bait." The family had an ongoing case for asylum and was not under a final removal order. The Department of Homeland Security said the father asked for his son to stay with him. The incident set off public outcry and gave rise to renewed debate over the treatment of minors and the ethical boundaries of enforcement operations in the U.S. immigration detention system.

=== Alternatives ===
ICE has acknowledged that its system of immigration detention needs an "overhaul." In 2009, it issued a report citing steps it planned to take "immediately," including hiring a medical professional to review medial complaints and establishing an Office of Detention Oversight (ODO), which will be independent from ERO and will report detainees grievances. U.S. Secretary of Homeland Security Janet Napolitano stated that alternatives to detention will be provided for immigrants who have no criminal convictions as a part of a series of new reforms planned for the country's immigration detention system. These alternatives include housing immigrants at "converted hotels, residential facilities or place[ing them] on electronic ankle bracelets for monitoring."

In 2016, California State Senator Ricardo Lara from California and co-sponsors the Immigrant Legal Resource Center (ILRC) and Freedom for Immigrants, formerly known as Community Initiatives for Visiting Immigrants in Confinement (CIVIC), introduced a bill Dignity not Detention, SB 1289, intended to curtail the practice of detaining immigrants for profit. Currently private prisons are making a substantial profit detaining immigrants. The bill would also ensure that detainees are treated fairly and humanely. SB 1289 was passed in California August 30, 2016, but Governor Jerry Brown vetoed it. However, Sen. Lara reintroduced the bill as SB 29 in 2017 and Gov. Brown signed it into law in October 2017. The measure went into effect January 2018, halting the expansion and construction of for-profit immigrant prisons in the state of California.

=== Solitary confinement ===
Solitary confinement is a common method used by ICE in detention centers. Throughout the United States, about 300 immigrants are in a state of solitary confinement, with half of them being isolated for more than 15 days. ICE identifies three purposes for segregating detainees:

- Administrative segregation: The main causes are if a detainee poses a threat towards other inmates or feels threatened by other inmates. However, it also applies for detainees that are awaiting a transfer to another detention center, their release, or a hearing for disciplinary action. Detainees sentenced to administrative segregation are subject to the same treatment that the rest of the population receive.
- Disciplinary segregation: If a detainee commits a serious violation of the center's disciplinary norms, the disciplinary facility panel may sentence the detainee to solitary confinement after a hearing. This is only to be used for serious violations that are congruent with the Disciplinary Severity Scale and where no other punishment would adequately fit the violation.
- Special vulnerabilities: Detainees that represent special circumstances for solitary confinement include those with poor medical conditions, pregnancies, mental health issues and the elderly. Also those who could be subject to harm by the rest of the detainees because of their sexual orientation or gender identity. Special vulnerabilities also include those who have suffered from sexual abuse before arriving in the detention center or during their stay.

Field Officer Directors are only required to write a report to the ICE headquarters only if detainees have been in solitary confinement for a 14-day period. However, cases of solitary confinement may be longer than 14 days, extending to 30, or even 60 days in extreme cases.

Dr. Stuart Grassian, a Board-Certified psychiatrist and former professor of the Harvard Medical School, an expert in the psychological effects of solitary confinement, has concluded that this practice can lead to a psychological syndrome termed as "prison psychosis". Some of the symptoms identified with prison psychosis are "hallucinations, panic attacks, overt paranoia, diminished impulse control, hypersensitivity to external stimuli and difficulties with thinking, concentration and memory". The U.N. Special Rapporteur on Torture and Other Cruel, Inhuman or Degrading Treatment or Punishment has stressed that solitary confinement that surpassed 15 days should be eradicated, since scientific evidence shows that it could have irreversible psychiatric consequences.

=== Access for Congressional oversight ===
The 2024 Homeland Security appropriations bill requires that members of Congress and their staff have access to "any facility operated by or for the Department of Homeland Security used to detain or otherwise house aliens", with no advance notice for members of Congress and 24-hour notice for staff. It also prohibits temporary changes for appearances during the visit. (Previous appropriations bills have had the same provision since 2020.)

In 2025, amid changes to deportation in the second presidency of Donald Trump, ICE officials denied entry to members of Congress at several detention facilities; among the reasons provided were that there were too many protesters outside, that members wouldn't be safe, that field offices holding detainees were not detention facilities, that ICE was too busy, that immigrants were being "processed" and not "detained," although not free to leave. In June, the Department of Homeland Security announced a policy requiring members of Congress give 72 hours notice before visiting. On July 30, twelve Democratic representatives who had been denied entry for attempted oversight visits during June and July filed a lawsuit in the District Court for the District of Columbia against the administration, challenging the policy as illegal.

== Policies by president ==
=== Under Obama ===
The Obama administration promised to overhaul the immigration detention system and transform it into one that is less punitive, more centralized, and more transparent. However, immigrant rights groups raised concerns about ongoing abuses against detainees. ICE officials were pressured to increase detention and deportation quotas to fulfill the agency's annual goal. A 2010 memo issued by James M. Chaparro, the chief of ICE's Detention and Removal Operations, "congratulated agents for reaching the agency's goal of '150,000 criminal alien removals' for the year ending Sept. 30" but "instructed agents to pick up the pace of deportations by detaining more noncitizens suspected only of unauthorized residence." Homeland Security Secretary Janet Napolitano also publicly endorsed the Secure Communities deportation initiative, which had "rapidly expanded" under the Obama administration, expressing a hope in 2009 that the program would expand to all of the United States by 2013.

In late February 2013, ICE announced that it has released "several hundred" detained immigrants from deportation centers ahead of budget cuts; the release of the detained immigrants was praised by Human Rights First, and criticized by Republican Representative Bob Goodlatte. The White House and the Department of Homeland Security distanced itself from the decision to release the detained immigrants with White House Press Secretary Jay Carney calling those released "low-risk, non-criminal detainees". The Associated Press reported that the official in charge of immigration enforcement and removal operations resigned due to the release of the detained illegal immigrants, but ICE stated that the official had retired and that his departure was not connected to the release. Those released were told they were bonded and released, with ICE officials saying that the released immigrants remain in deportation proceedings. In March 2013, the Department of Homeland Security announced that the number released was more than 2,000 in the states of Arizona, California, Georgia, and Texas; the department also stated it plans to release an additional 3,000 in March 2013. The Politico reports that the cost of housing detained immigrants cost about $164 per day per person.

In 2014, the Obama administration constructed detention facilities, which included cages, to hold children who had crossed the border. These facilities were later used by the Donald Trump administration.

In a memo made public in 2015, officials issued guidance for ICE personnel directing staff to house transgender immigrants in sex-segregated housing that corresponds with their gender identity.

In 2015, the U.S. Commission on Civil Rights did a report entitled With Liberty and Justice for All: The State Civil Rights in Immigration Detention Facilities, which was critical of conditions at immigration detention facilities. One Commissioner filed a lengthy dissent.

=== Under the first Trump administration ===
Following two executive orders on January 25, 2017, ICE accelerated its pace of arrests, arresting 41,000 people within the next 100 days. During the 2017 fiscal year, ICE held a daily average of slightly more than 38,000 people in detention. In President Trump's 2018 budget proposal, the administration proposed spending more on immigration detention beds, expanding capacity to 48,000 people. In addition to detainees, ICE supervises the status of 2.3 million people, who must regularly check in with the agency. Immigration and Customs Enforcement (ICE, immigration police) and Customs and Border Protection (CBP) increased the number of unaccompanied minors detained nearly sixfold, from an average of 2,400 each night in May 2017 to 12,800 each evening in September 2018. Many academics have labelled the migrant detention centers as concentration camps, but others disregard this issue. In June 2020, reports from multiple news outlets reported that detainees were gassed with disinfectant and tear gas that led to multiple injuries. Also, there have been claims of illegal sterilization on women, and of migrant children being isolated from their families, both practices were compared to "experimental concentration camps".

=== Under Biden ===
After the COVID-19 pandemic, ICE detentions rose during the Biden administration before accelerating during the second Trump administration.

In May 2021, the unprecedented surge of unaccompanied minors at the US-Mexico border reached more than 21,000 children. The children are being temporarily housed in shelters in Dallas and San Antonio, Texas, as well as the Long Beach Convention & Entertainment Center in California under the care of the Department of Health and Human Services. The time the children spend in government custody is lessening, to 30 days from 42 days under the Trump administration.

Beginning in February 2021, the administration awarded nearly $3 billion in contracts to private entities to provide accommodations for unaccompanied children. Over $2 billion was in no-bid contracts to three organizations: Deployed Resources, LLC of Rome, New York; Mobile, AL-located Rapid Deployment Inc.; and Family Endeavors (AKA Endeavors) of San Antonio. Deployed Resources will be paid up to $719 million to manage a Donna Texas 1500 beds emergency refuge for children. Rapid Deployment has been awarded two contracts for $614 million to run a Fort Bliss, Texas site that could become the largest in the country as it expands to 10,000 potential beds. Family Endeavors has previously received $87 million from ICE to house migrant families in hotel rooms and could be paid up to $580 million to manage a crisis intake facility in Pecos Texas.

=== Under the second Trump administration ===
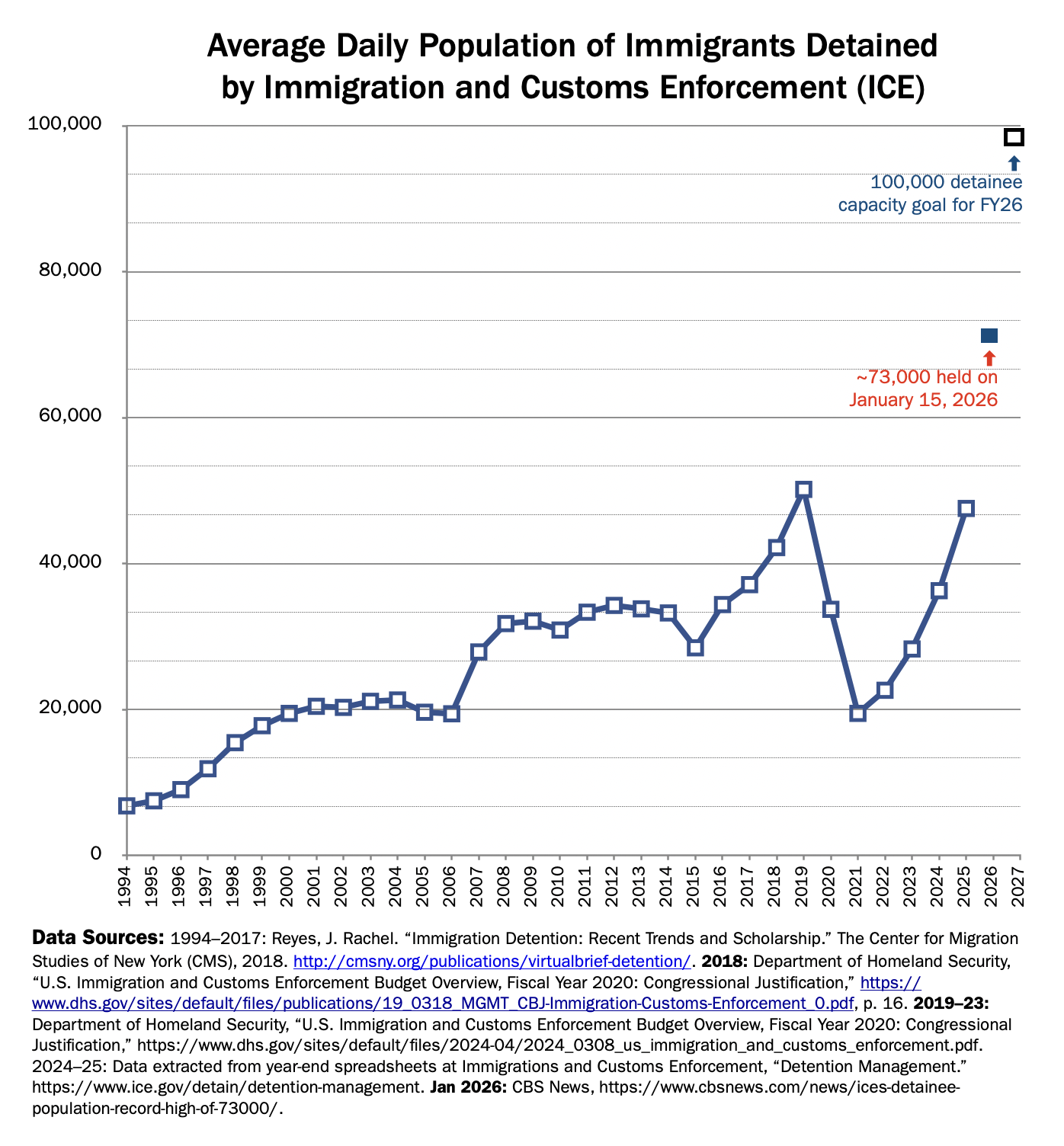
Average daily population of detained immigrants held by the United States government for the fiscal years 1994-2025

The number of people arrested by ICE increased in the second term of Donald Trump, expanding to include greater numbers who had no criminal record.

The second Trump administration has expanded immigration detention in the United States as part of the administration's mass deportation policy. On January 23, 2025, ICE began to carry out raids on sanctuary cities, with hundreds of immigrants detained. The Trump administration reversed the policy of the previous administration and gave ICE permission to raid schools, hospitals and places of worship. Fears of ICE raids have negatively impacted the agriculture, construction, tourism, and hospitality industries. ICE agents conducting raids frequently travel in unmarked vehicles, wear plainclothes and facial coverings, and refuse to identify themselves or present warrants. The administration ordered the re-opening of the Guantanamo Bay detention camp to hold potentially tens of thousands of illegal aliens, but has faced logistical and legal difficulties using it as an immigrant camp. The majority of detentions have been for non-violent matters. Courts have ruled more than 4,400 times that the Trump administration is detaining people illegally. Several US citizens have been detained. In October 2025, around 3,000 people were detained by ICE in the Chicago metropolitan area during Operation Midway Blitz. Government officials refused or were unable to confirm their whereabouts. In July 2026, 49,571 people were arrested by United States Immigration and Customs Enforcement, the highest monthly arrest total during Trump's second presidential term by that point.

According to the Secretary of Homeland Security, Kristi Noem, by August 2025, 1.6 million illegal migrants would have self-deported from the country, although this figure has not been independently verified.

== Transgender immigrant issues ==
With many countries still persecuting the LGBTQ+ community, gender and sexuality-related immigration to the United States is not uncommon. It has been reported that as many as nearly 40,000 transgender individuals are currently being held in immigration detention centers, but due to the cisnormative design of these centers, many transgender individuals detained by ICE are at an increased risk of harm

As of 2016, investigations of the conditions under which transgender detainees live in has resulted in an overwhelming plea for reformation, suggesting that these individuals do not receive adequate protection, care, and housing The SPLC generated a series of potential improvements that can be made to better provide for the safety and comfort of these transgender individuals. Moreover, many LGBTQ activists and supporters have advocated that transgender immigrants should not be detained pending their immigration cases given that ICE has demonstrated a failure to detain those included in this at-risk group without infringing on their human rights or jeopardizing their safety. In February 2025, the Trump administration stopped reporting the number of transgender people in immigration detention.

=== Access to gender-affirming care ===
Transgender detainees have reported that many of them have requested hormonal treatment, yet were never provided with such access to hormones while in private detention centers. The Southern Poverty Law Center (SPLC) has conducted a thorough investigation on the living conditions of these private institutions, and have suggested that transgender detainees who had previously been subjected to hormonal therapies, should be allowed to continue these hormonal therapies while in detention centers.

=== Sexual assault ===
Detainees who identify as LGBTQ are found to be 15 times more likely to be sexually assaulted than their heterosexual, non-transgender counterparts.

=== Isolation ===
When not placed with the population that matches their sex assigned at birth, many detained transgender individuals are placed in isolation. Despite research that shows that solitary confinement for a period longer than 15 days can have significant psychological impacts on a person, many transgender individuals are placed in isolation for months at a time. For example, Human Rights Watch reported that a transgender woman from Mexico had been held in solitary confinement for about 18 months before being deported, and Transgender Law Center shared the story of a transgender man from Hong Kong who was held in solitary confinement for 19 months before being transferred to a women's center. These extended periods in Solitary confinement are justified under the idea of protection, but can have long-lasting effects on the mental health of immigrants in the forms of depression, PTSD, anxiety, and other mental illnesses.

=== Segregation ===
Some private detention centers, such as Prairieland near Dallas, Texas, are designed with units to specifically designated to house transgender detainees in a separate area from all other immigrants, in order to remain under watchful protection. This visible segregation has resulted in many transgender immigrants wondering if such a specific housing unit causes more harm than good. Even with the availability of a separate transgender unit, some transgender detainees request to be placed with the male population, as they fear that stigma may possibly arise as a result from being separated from the normal population.

== Migrant women in detention centers ==
As of July 2019, around 55,654 individuals were detained in a facility by ICE and/or CBP, 9,176 of which were women. However, as of FY 2024, around 38,000 immigrants were detained and in custody of ICE/CBP, with roughly 5,900 being women. According to ICE and ERO standards and policy, there are particular standards and protocols related to care that directly concern women and their processing. ICE and ERO adhere by the Performance-Based National Detention Standards (PBNDS) of 2011, which has since been updated in 2016. The PBNDS 2011 guidelines create standard policies that ICE adheres by to maintain their facilities and care of migrants/immigrants in detention, aiming to maintain "a safe and secure detention environment for staff and detainees" PBNDS 11 section 4.4 and its revisions set a health care standard for women that includes an initial health assessment upon processing and a variety of reproductive health care services such as: pregnancy services, abortion care, gynecological exams like pap smears, and testing for sexually transmitted infections. Additionally, there are provisions in section 2.11 that include procedures for survivors of sexual abuse and assault to report and receive referrals to treatment.

These guidelines set a particular standard of care for ICE facilities must follow, however, due to complicated nature of detention of immigrants in the US, the varying agencies that detain immigrants such as ICE, CBP, ORR have different standards. For example, CBP utilizes the National Standards on Transport, Escort, Detention, and Search (TEDS) policy. Additionally, facilities operate under a range of entities—from the federal government under DHS with either ICE or CBP, but also, due to outsourcing, state/local agencies and privately run detention centers also operate under their own policies. Critics argue that this nature of the detention system create gaps in care and standards that make women vulnerable and lead to insufficient levels of care.

Despite various standards that are in place, multiple studies and reports raise concern about the adherence or violations of standards and adverse experiences of migrant women in detention centers. There have been reports in recent years calling attention to experiences of sexual assault among women and girls within detention, lack of reproductive care, instances of adverse pregnancy outcomes, miscarriages due to improper care, and instances of sterilization through involuntary hysterectomies. According to a 2023 Futuro Media investigative report, a pattern of sexual abuse in ICE detention arose and they cite "308 sexual assault and sexual abuse complaints filed by immigrants detained in ICE facilities nationwide between 2015 and 2021" with more than half of which were directed against staff. Other studies and research also sound alarm to multiple and growing instances of "unnecessary hysterectomies performed without informed consent" and overall instances of medical mistreatment and lack of access to proper care.

The Intercept published a report by the DHS Office of Inspector General revealing that 1,224 sexual abuse complaints while in immigration custody were filed between January 2010 and June 2017. Contrary to ICE's claims, only 2% of these complaints were investigated. In 2020, the Kino Border Initiative received 442 reports of alleged abuse by US agents, meaning 18% of new arrivals were allegedly abused by a US official.

=== Forced sterilization allegations ===
In 2020, multiple human rights groups joined a whistleblower to accuse the privately owned Irwin County Detention Center in Ocilla, Georgia of forcibly sterilizing women. The reports claimed a doctor conducted unauthorized medical procedures on women detained by ICE. The whistleblower, Dawn Wooten, was a nurse and former employee. She alleged that a high rate of sterilizations were performed on Spanish-speaking women and women who spoke various Indigenous languages common in Latin America. Wooten said the center did not obtain proper consent for these surgeries, or lied to women about the medical procedures. More than 40 women submitted testimony in writing to document these abuses, one attorney said. Jerry Flores, a faculty member at the University of Toronto Mississauga said the alleged treatment of women constituted a violation of human rights and genocide according to the standards of the United Nations. Just Security of the New York University School of Law said the U.S. bore "international responsibility for the forced sterilization of women in ICE detention". In September 2020, Mexico demanded more information from US authorities on medical procedures performed on migrants in detention centers, after allegations that six Mexican women were sterilized without their consent. Another woman said she had undergone a gynecological operation, although there was nothing in her detention file to support she agreed to the procedure.

=== Impacts of Privatization on Migrant Women's Reproductive Health ===
Privately operated detention centers that have contracted with ICE house more than 90% of detained immigrants. With almost 400,000 migrants detained annually in the United States, women make up a notable percentange of the population being held in private for-profit immigration detention centers. In addition, medical abuses make up the highest amount of complaints reported in private immigration detention, leading researchers and advocates to focus on the gendered dimensions of these concerns. Migrant women face distinct barriers in accessing quality medical and mental health care that is tied to their gender-specific needs. Particularly, reproductive and gynecological health care in private immigration detention represents a key aspect of women's health to which they are entitled to according to ICE 2011 Performance-Based National Detention Standards (PBNDS). However, advocates have increasingly scrutinized the lack of or inadequacy of quality reproductive and gynecological services within these centers. For example, in September 2020, a nurse working at a private detention center filed a whistleblower complaint detailing conditions in the dedicated immigration wing at Irwin County Detention Center (ICDC). While the mass hysterectomy allegations that received the most media attention were not substantiated, the U.S. Senate investigation findings revealed a "disturbing pattern" of medically unnecessary, nonconsensual, and invasive gynecological procedures conducted by a privately contracted OBGYN, Dr. Mahendra Amin. The investigation also concluded that there was a lack of oversight from ICE in the off-site treatment facility, Irwin County Hospital, where the impacted women were medically mistreated. Following the 2020 ICDC case and reversal of Roe v. Wade in 2022, human rights groups and legal representatives allege that pregnant migrant women detained in privately run facilities continue to face reproductive health challenges, such as miscarriages (a metric ICE no longer tracks since late 2025), inadequate prenatal care, restrictions in obtaining abortions, and detention conditions that are unsafe for pregnancy.

== See also ==
- List of detention sites in the United States
- Illegal immigration to the United States
- History of U.S. immigration laws
- Immigration detention in Australia
- Family detention
- List of deaths in ICE detention
