= Irwin County Detention Center =

Private prison in Georgia, US

Coordinates: 31.579605°N 83.255403°W

Irwin County Georgia where the Irwin County Detention Center is located.

The Irwin County Detention Center, located in Ocilla, Georgia is privately owned by Louisiana-based LaSalle Corrections. In 2010, United States Immigration and Customs Enforcement (ICE) contracted to use the facility as an immigrant detention center and renewed its contract with LaSalle in 2019 at a rate for each immigrant of $71.29 a day. The detention center lost its contract in 2021 with the government after a series of human rights violations in 2020. At least 43 women prisoners and a whistleblower nurse came forward alleging that non-consensual surgeries and medically unnecessary procedures, including hysterectomies, were performed by a gynecologist affiliated with the jail. The women also complained of retaliation and subpar COVID-19 treatment. On December 22, 2020, forty migrant women being held at the Irwin County Detention Center filed a lawsuit alleging abuse and unnecessary forced medical procedures, including the hysterectomies.

In 2021, the court case, Oldaker v. Giles and an investigation conducted by the US Senate led to the termination of the US government's contract with the detention center. In January 2025, the case was settled to the parties’ mutual satisfaction. By October 2025 however, ICE renewed a contract with Irwin County Detention Center.

== History ==
The Irwin County Detention Center is a 1296-bed jail located in Ocilla, Georgia and owned privately owned by Louisiana-based LaSalle Corrections. In 2010, United States Immigration and Customs Enforcement (ICE) contracted to use the facility as an immigrant detention center. It renewed the contract in 2019 at a rate of $71.29 per immigrant per day.

=== Allegations in 2016 ===
Concerns about the Irwin County Detention Center (IDC) had been raised in a 2016 report to a Department of Homeland Security committee; it indicated that there was a failure to provide sufficient medical care to immigrant detainees. In 2017, Project South, an Atlanta-based grassroots organization, and Penn State published a report on the conditions at two Georgia immigration centers: Stewart Detention Center and Irwin County Detention Center. The report highlighted issues detainees faced such as overcrowded housing, unhygienic living conditions, and lack of legal access. Concerns were brought to the media's attention in 2019 when famous rapper 21 Savage, a British national, was detained in the Irwin Detention Center for a week. ICE renewed its contract with LaSalle in 2019 paying $71.29 per immigrant daily. The average number of immigrants at Irwin during 2019 was 848 making their average income $2.9 million a week. Despite the money sent to Irwin the healthcare continued to be poor leading to further allegations in 2020.

Dr. Mahendra Amin, the gynecologist at the facility also had a “history of medical malpractice suits filed against him.” This included fraudulent Medicaid claims. This dispute was settled by a payment of over half a million dollars. This was paid for by Amin and eight fellow doctors at Irwin County Hospital.

=== Allegations in 2020 ===
On September 14, 2020, Dawn Wooten, a licensed nurse who worked at the Irwin County Detention Center, filed a whistleblower complaint against the facility. She was represented by Project South, Georgia Detention Watch, the Georgia Latino Alliance for Human Rights, and the South Georgia Immigrant Support Network.

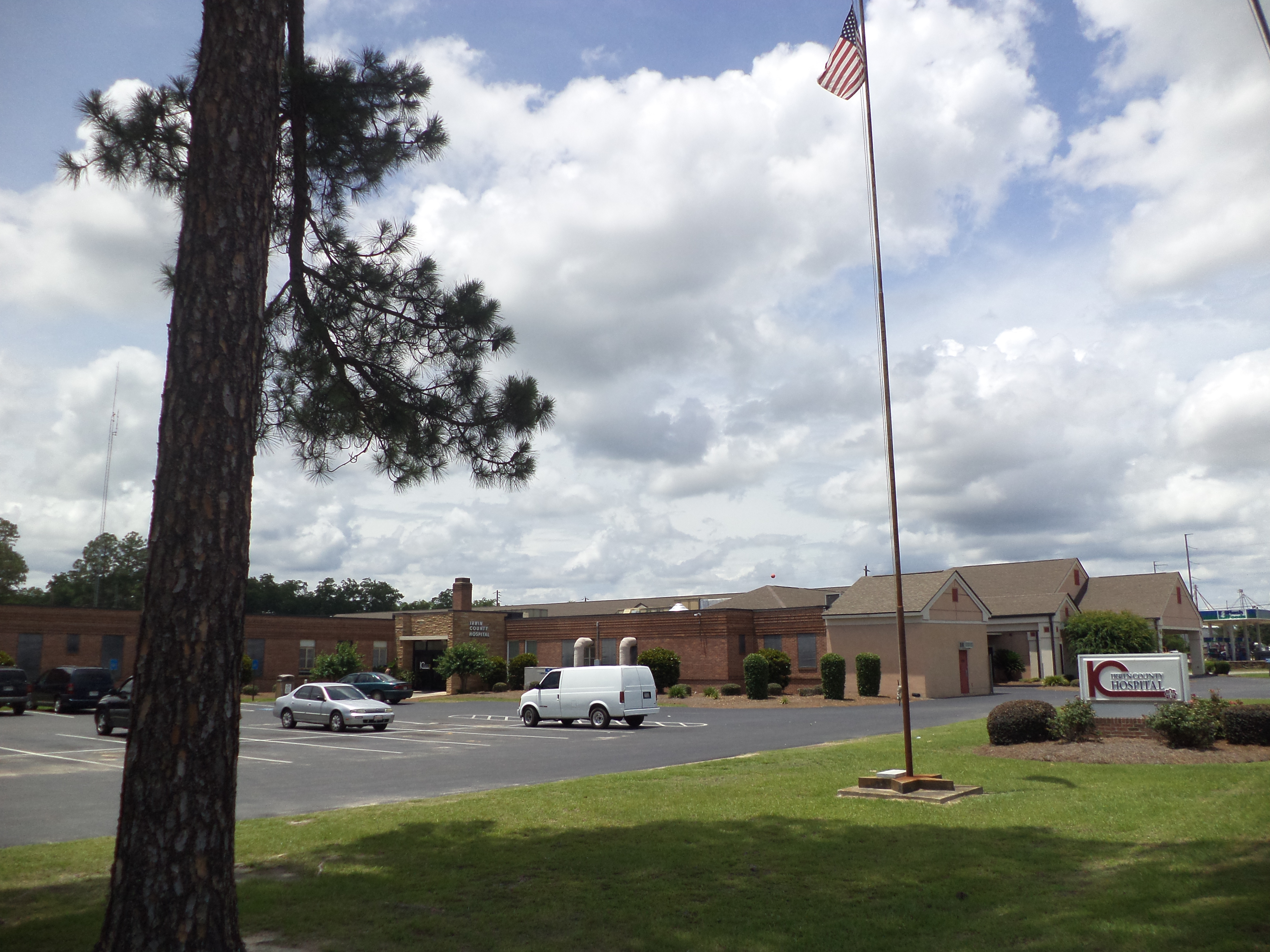
Irwin County Hospital where immigrant detainees were taken off site to be treated.

The reports focused extensively on the detention center's failure to comply with the appropriate COVID-19 protocol, including the lack of quarantine for new arrivals, little to no treatment for detainees with symptoms, and fabricated medical records.

Another complaint was the violation of informed consent as outlined in the ICE National Detention Standards. It was reported that Google Translate or other inmates were used to provide translation of information about medical procedures leading to miscommunications, including women receiving hysterectomies. The report stated that women were receiving these hysterectomies without their knowledge. Whistleblower Dawn Wooten would even label Dr. Mahendra Amin as the “Uterus Collector." The title of “uterus collector” and nonconsensual reproductive procedures led this event to be widely publicized. While there were only three pages regarding these gynecological procedures in the initial report, these allegations were the most widely publicized.

Throughout these events Dr. Amin maintained his innocence with his lawyer stating, “that Dr. Amin always acted appropriately with patients, obtained informed consent, and used translators/interpreters whenever necessary."

Female detainees had actively tried to advocate for themselves, even creating a YouTube video about their experiences. Attempts to report the abuse led to punishment, including solitary confinement, transfer of unit, and even physical assault. Hunger strikes were met with rationed food, stolen money, and restricted technology use.

=== Oldaker v. Giles ===
On December 21, 2020, the National Immigration Project of the National Lawyers Guild (NIPNLG), David Dreyer, Project South as well as law school clinics from Harvard, University of Georgia, Columbia, Texas A&M, and Boston University filed litigation for fourteen women who had been detained in ICDC. The case included more than forty testimonies from women detailing medical abuses happening at ICDC.

The court case included a filing that resulted in the release of custody for the women involved in the case. On January 22, 2021, all of the women from the case were released from the Irwin County Detention Center to their families, but they were still under the supervision of ICE.

In response to the case and ongoing advocacy work, the Joe Biden administration announced severance with the Irwin Detention Center in May 2021 and all detainees were relocated to other facilities by September 3, 2021. The severance was legally enforced on October 7th, 2021 with the official termination of ICE's contract with the Irwin County Detention Center.

Under supplemental jurisdiction, the Federal Court can handle state claims related to the case even if those claims fall outside the court's usual authority. However, in this case, the federal court chose not to exercise this power, leading to the dismissal of all defendants besides the United States. The plaintiff's counsel proceeded with the case, asserting that the 2020 medical abuse claims from the ICDC fall under the Federal Tort Claims Act. In January 2025, the case was settled to the parties’ mutual satisfaction.

=== U.S. Senate Permanent Subcommittee on Investigations, 2022 ===
In 2022, the United States Senate's Permanent Subcommittee on Investigations, released a 103-page report after it investigated the Irwin Detention Center. It was released two years after the 2020 allegations on November 15, 2022. Senator Jon Ossoff and Senator Ron Johnson led this 18-month bipartisan investigation. Throughout the inquiry, Dr. Amin fervently denied the allegations and refused to appear before the committee. However, the investigation discovered a “history of medical malpractice suits filed against him.” While Dr. Amin only treated 6.5% of ICDC detainees, he performed 94% of the laparoscopies. The committee concluded that the women at the detention center, “appear to have been subjected to excessive, invasive, and often unnecessary gynecological procedures.” However, the allegation spread across news headlines that Dr. Amin performed unrequired hysterectomies was found false stating, “The Subcommittee found this allegation to be false, and ICE determined that the two hysterectomies Dr. Amin performed on ICDC detainees appeared to be medically necessary.”

Karina Cisneros Preciado's November 2022 testimony before the subcommittee was widely published. Preciado had been separated from her newborn child when she was placed in ICDC. While there, her postpartum care was delayed despite experiencing pain. She was eventually taken off-site to Dr. Amin where she received an unexplained vaginal ultrasound despite being told she was being taken for a pap smear. The result of the visit was a Depo-Provera shot for a supposed ovarian cyst. She was informed that if the shot failed, she would need to undergo surgery. Such a surgery was prevented as allegations of abuse surfaced before her return.

=== Defamation lawsuit, 2024 ===
Dr. Amin filed a defamation lawsuit which was set to be heard in April 2025. He was suing NBCUniversal Media for claiming that he performed, “massed hysterectomies” and Wondery for labelling him as a “uterus collector.” He was suing them for a combined total of $45 million. The lawsuit was settled in February 2025 with U.S. District Judge Lisa Godbey Wood commenting that "undisputed evidence has established" that "there were no mass hysterectomies or high numbers of hysterectomies at the facility"

=== Dawn Wooten ===
Dawn Wooten, now known as the ICE whistleblower, had seen the COVID violations and became more alarmed as women began to describe experiences of uninformed sterility. In 2020, Wooten reported these issues to her supervisors, leading to her demotion to an on-call position. Following the demotion, she was not called to fulfill any further shifts at the center, and although she was never formally terminated, she was effectively side-lined. Wooten struggled to secure further employment due to her publicity, which affected her and her family.

Wooten would eventually be represented by Project South and the Government Accountability Project when she made the whistleblower complaints in 2020. She would continue to advocate for her patients calling for congressional action. For her advocacy Wooten has won many awards including the 2021 Joe Callaway Award for Civic Courage, the Feleta Wilson Award, the 2022 Physicians for Human Rights Award, and the 2022 HMH Foundation First Amendment Award. The Giraffe Heroes Project named her as a Giraffe Hero and she was also portrayed in the Americans Who Tell Truth Portrait series.

=== 2025 ===
In October 2025 ICE renewed a contract with Irwin County Detention Center.

== See also ==
- Glades County Detention Center
