= Jason Ng =

Jason Ng may refer to:

- Jason Hiu Lui Ng (c. 1975–2008), New Yorker who died while in custody of United States Immigration and Customs Enforcement
- Jason Ng (triathlete) (born 2000), triathlete from Hong Kong
- Jason Ng Thien Yeong (born 1992), politician and lawyer from Malaysia
