= Never Again Action =

American Jewish political organization

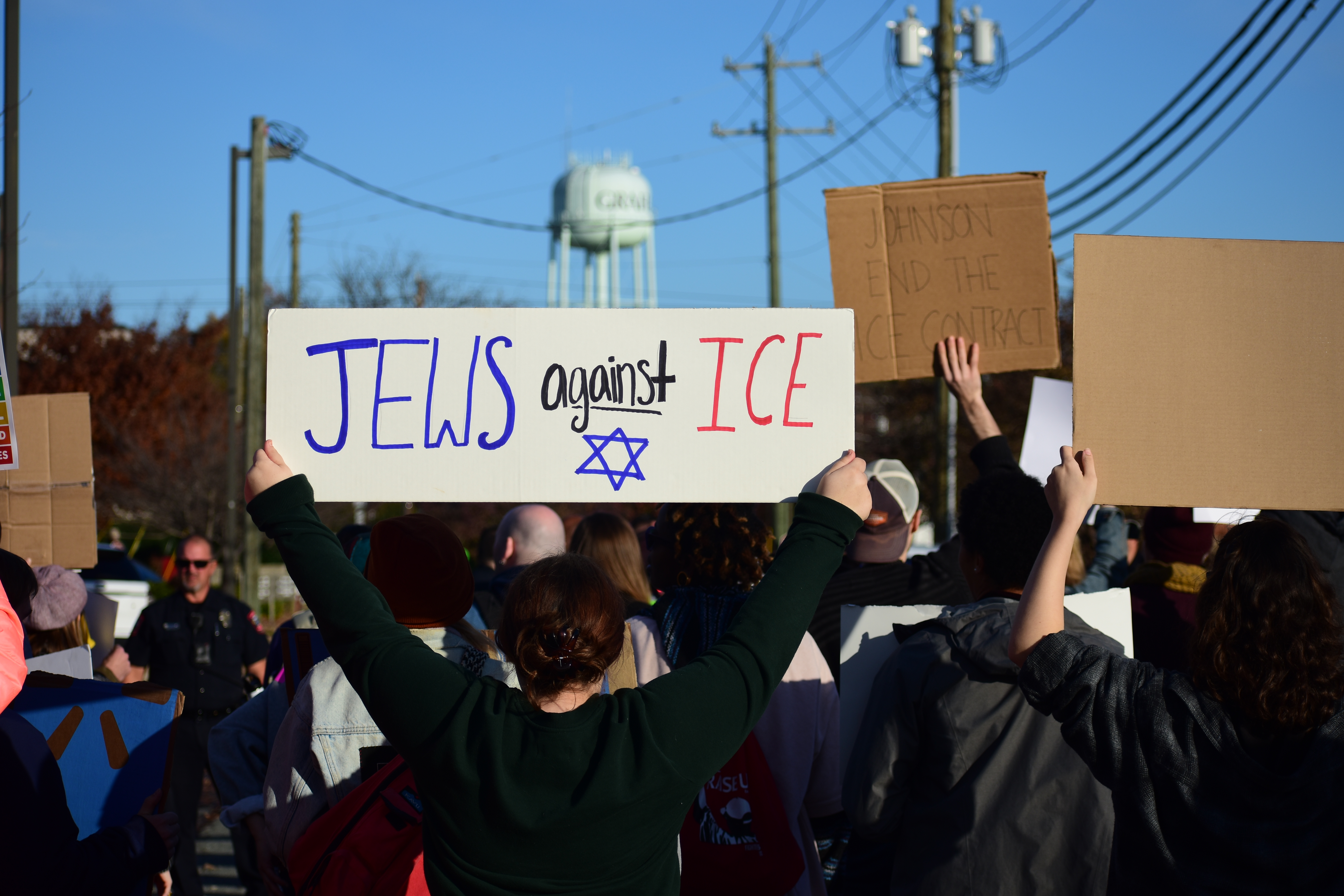
Never Again Action protest in Graham, North Carolina

Never Again Action is a Jewish political action organization in the United States that uses civil disobedience and nonviolent methods to protest Immigration and Customs Enforcement (ICE). The organization derives its name from the slogan 'never again' which is often used in reference to the Holocaust.

== History ==
Amateur video of 2019 Tisha B'Av protest in Maryland

On June 24, 2019, Serena Adlerstein made an informal statement on Facebook about organizing Jews to protest immigrant detention centers in the U.S. Her Facebook network was politically active and soon afterward protests were organized. On June 30, 2019, around 200 people protested at the Elizabeth Contract Detention Center in Elizabeth, New Jersey where police arrested 36 people for blocking exits. In Boston, On July 2, 2019, around 1000 people protested at the Suffolk County House of Corrections after marching from the New England Holocaust Memorial, 18 arrests were made and the state declined to prosecute. On the 4th of July parade in Philadelphia, 33 were arrested for protesting. In July 2019, the organization blocked the doors of the ICE headquarters in Washington, D.C. On July 15, around 100 protested outside the ICE office in Atlanta, Georgia resulting in two arrests. On the 2019 Tisha B'Av holiday, protests were held in more than 50 locations in cities including Washington, D.C., New York, Houston, Salt Lake City, Boston and Baltimore. In New York city, 40 protesters were arrested at an Amazon store for protesting the company's business ties with ICE.

=== Actions ===
Date	City	Target	Protesters	Arrests	Notes
6/30/19	Elizabeth, NJ	Elizabeth Contract Detention Center	200	36	
7/2/19	Boston, MA	Suffolk County House of Corrections	1000	18	State declined to prosecute.
7/2/19	Central Falls, RI	Wyatt Detention Center	200	18	
7/3/19	Los Angeles, CA	Theo Lacy Detention Center			
7/4/19	Philadelphia, PA	ICE Field office		33	Blocked 4 July parade
7/5/19	San Francisco, CA	Nancy Pelosi's Office			
7/5/19	Chicago, IL	Senator Dick Durbin's office			
7/8/19	New York City	Palantir Office			
7/9/19	Washington, DC	US Capitol			
7/11/19	New York City	Amazon AWS conference			
7/11/19	Buffalo, NY	ICE Field Office			
7/12/19	Grand Rapids, MI	ICE Field Office			
7/14/19	Concord, NH	NH Statehouse			
7/15/19	Atlanta, Georgia	ICE Field office	100	2	
7/16/19	Washington, DC	ICE Headquarters			
7/19/19	Denver, CO	Federal Building			
7/19/19	Portland, Maine	Longfellow Square			
7/20/19	Pompano Beach, FL	Broward Transitional Center			
7/21/19	Baltimore, MD	Johns Hopkins University Stage, Artscape			
7/21/19	Houston, TX	Southwest Key Detention Center			
7/23/19	Cleveland, OH	Geauga County Detention Center			
7/25/19	Overland Park, KS	Rep. Sharice David's office			
7/28/19	Williston, VT	ICE Data Center			
7/30/19	Twin Cities, MN	ICE Field office			
8/1/19	Milwaukee, WI	ICE Field Office			Mobilized outside of the political action organization; the group formalized its connection following the action.
8/2/19	Portland, OR	ICE Field Office			
8/5/19	Los Angeles, CA	GEO Group West Coast Headquarters			
8/6/19	St. Louis, MO	ICE Field office			
8/8/19	Cincinnati, OH	Butler County Detention Center			
8/8/19	Seattle, WA	ICE Field Office			
8/11/19	New York, NY	Amazon Bookstore			Tisha B'av demonstrations
8/11/19	Baltimore, MD	Howard County Detention Center			
8/12/19	Broward County, FL	GEO Group International Headquarters			
8/12/19	Houston, TX	Southwest Key Detention Center			
8/14/19	Central Falls, RI	Wyatt Detention Center			Prison Guard drove truck into crowd of protestors.
11/24/19	Graham, NC	Alamance County Detention Center	300	9	

=== August 2019 truck attack ===
On August 14, 2019, several hundred protesters were organized outside of a parking lot by the Donald W. Wyatt Detention Facility in Central Falls, Rhode Island, when an ICE employee drove his pickup truck into the protesters. The incident broke the leg and caused internal bleeding of a 64 year old protester. Immediately afterwards, ICE guards pepper sprayed the protesters and the guard who drove the truck was not detained. On August 15, 2019, the driver of the truck was placed on leave and he resigned the next day. The incident prompted an investigation by the Rhode Island Attorney General.
