= Stewart Detention Center =

Private prison in Georgia, United States

Coordinates: 32°02′12″N 84°46′19″W

- Interactive map of Stewart Detention Center
- Location: 146 CCA Road Lumpkin, Georgia
- Status: open
- Security class: medium
- Capacity: 1752
- Opened: 2004
- Managed by: U.S. Immigration and Customs Enforcement

Stewart Detention Center is a private prison operated by CoreCivic under contract with the U.S. Immigration and Customs Enforcement, primarily used for housing immigrant detainees. The facility stands in Lumpkin, Stewart County, Georgia and has an official capacity of 1752 inmates.

In 2011 Stewart was ranked as the largest and busiest such facility in the United States. Stewart County's share of revenue from the federal government, 85 cents per inmate per day, amounted to more than half of the county's entire annual budget.

Stewart was named one of ten ICE facilities targeted for closure by the Detention Watch Network in 2012, citing the March 2009 death of inmate Roberto Medina-Martinez reportedly caused by medical neglect, among many other serious issues. Stewart was also identified by the ACLU of Georgia in 2012 as one of four ICE detention centers that demonstrate that "ICE has consistently shown that it is incapable of protecting the basic human rights of immigrants under its care." (The other three were the North Georgia Detention Center, the Irwin County Detention Center, and the Atlanta City Detention Center.)
