= Donald W. Wyatt Detention Facility =

Detention facility in Central Falls, Rhode Island, U.S.

- Interactive map of Donald W. Wyatt Detention Facility
- Location: Central Falls, Rhode Island; 41.8925°N 71.3838°W
- Capacity: 730 males, 40 females
- Opened: 1993
- Managed by: Central Falls Detention Facility Corporation

The Donald W. Wyatt Detention Facility was established in 1993 as the United States' first publicly owned and privately operated adult secure correctional facility and is currently operated by the Central Falls Detention Facility Corporation. This special non-profit, quasi-public detention facility was developed for use by the United States Marshal Service (USMS) in the Northeast and was later extended to include United States Immigration and Customs Enforcement (ICE) from 2005 to 2008 and again starting in 2019. Beginning in October 2011, the facility began serving the United States Navy, housing Navy personnel who have been placed in the custody of the General Court-Martial Convening Authority (GCMC). The facility operates at maximum security utilizing an architectural and high-tech design and construction containment system. A $47 million expansion was completed in December 2006 and increased the maximum occupancy from 300 all-male housing to its current capacity of 770 including a 40-bed unit for female detainees. It is the corporation's only facility. In July 2026, the prison filed for Chapter 11 bankruptcy protection after claiming that it could no longer continue to pay more than $167 million in debt.

== Overview ==
The facility was the very first privately run detention center in the United States. The prison was built in the city of Central Falls, Rhode Island. The city of Central Falls contributed funds towards its construction. The prison was created to generate employment in order to replace industrial jobs from closed textile mills.

Officers are paid $27 an hour in conjunction with shift differentials and roll call incentives while completing their probationary first year of employment. Officers are given an additional wage increase upon successful completion of their one-year probationary period. Officers and Sergeants employed by the Donald W. Wyatt Detention Facility are represented by the Fraternal Order of Police lodge # 50.

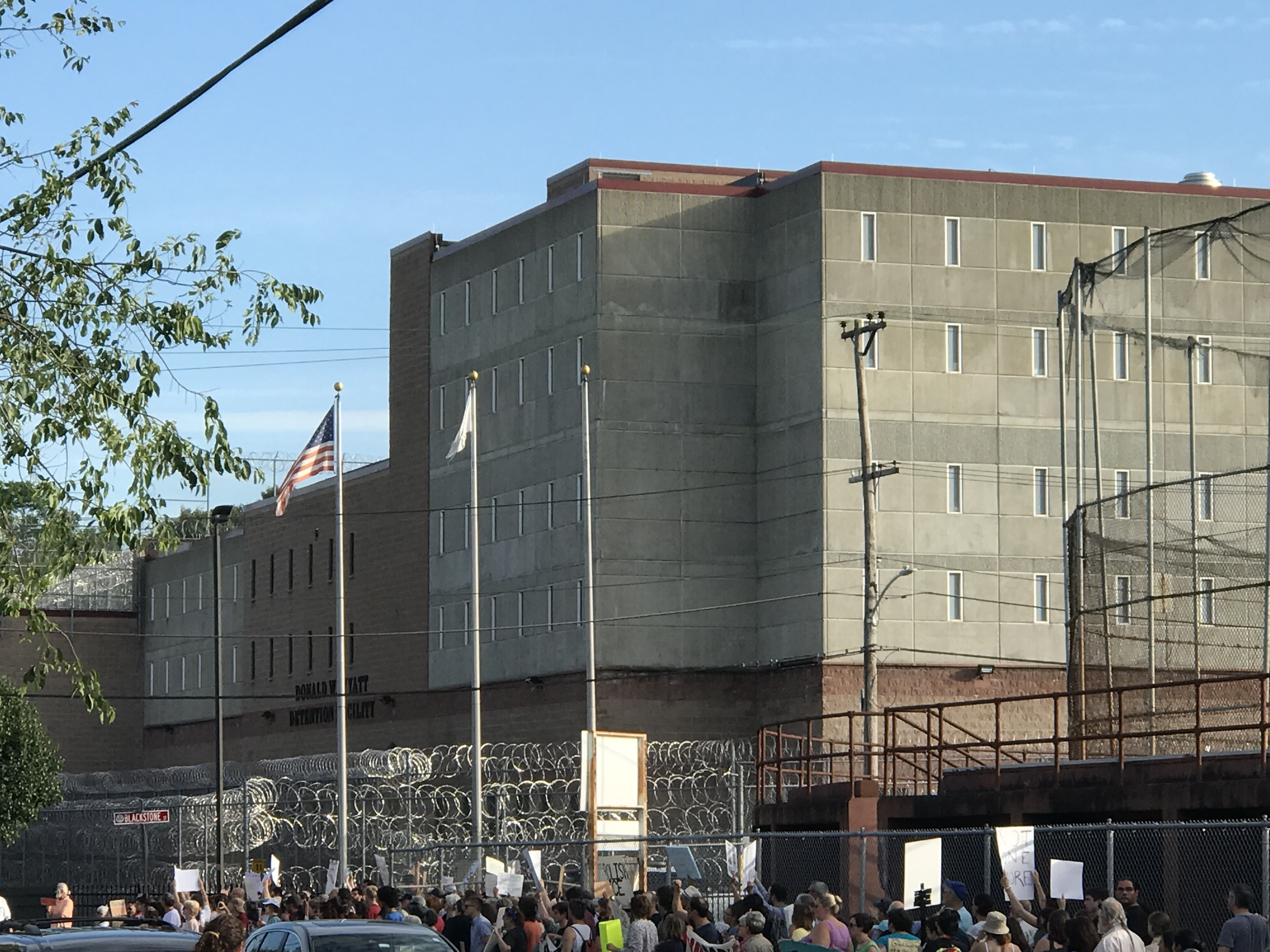

== Protest ==
Protests against the Wyatt started when the facility renewed its contract with ICE in March, 2019. On March 28, a group of local activists from Central Falls led a march from City Hall to the detention center. That summer, the Jewish organization Never Again Action organized a protest on July 3, at which 18 people were arrested, and another protest on August 14, at which a Wyatt employee drove his truck into the crowd. Since then, a variety of local groups have continued protesting the facility. The Alliance to Mobilize Our Resistance (AMOR) is a nonprofit organization in Rhode Island that is advocating for the Wyatt to end its contract with ICE and for the prison to be shut down. Beginning in 2025, AMOR has published reports based on inside testimonies, oversight inspections, and community research about ICE detention, ICE transfers, and conditions at the Wyatt. These reports include documentation of the following:

- Medical neglect
- Imprisonment for profit
- Hunger and food service violations
- Unsafe drinking water
- Racism and arbitrary punishment
- Theft of personal property
- Harassment and use of force
- Failure to provide access to legal resources
- Transfers as a tool of terror
- Transfers destroying due process
- Police influencing deportations
- Transfers separating people from families, lawyers, and resources
- Unsafe and unjust conditions

== Deaths ==
Hiu Lui "Jason" Ng, an immigrant from China, was an ICE Detainee who died while in custody of the Donald W. Wyatt Facility. The official cause of his death was cancer. In February 2009, the Rhode Island ACLU filed a lawsuit on behalf of Ng's family, alleging “cruel, inhumane, malicious and sadistic behavior” against him. In 2012, the lawsuit was settled, with a multi-million dollar payment to the family.

The United States Immigration and Customs Enforcement Agency withdrew its remaining 153 prisoners from the facility in mid-December 2008, following an inquiry into Ng's death.

The prison continues to house inmates of the United States Marshal Service and of the United States Navy's General Court-Martial Convening Authority (GCMC), and on March 10, 2019, it renewed its contract with ICE.

== Escapes ==
James Morales was discovered missing from the Wyatt Detention Facility in Central Falls on Saturday, Dec. 31 2016, at around 10 p.m. He had been detained at the facility since Dec. 3, 2015, on federal criminal charges brought in U.S. District Court in Worcester, Massachusetts.

Morales was captured five days after his escape by a Massachusetts State Trooper and two Somerville Police detectives in Somerville following a foot pursuit, after Morales attempted to rob a Bank of America in Somerville, Mass.
