= ICE Performance-Based National Detention Standards of 2011 =

In 2011, the U.S. Immigration and Customs Enforcement Agency revised its national detention standards and developed the Performance-Based National Detention Standards. According to U.S. Immigration and Customs Enforcement, "the PBNDS 2011 are crafted to improve medical and mental health services, increase access to legal services and religious opportunities, improve communication with detainees with no or limited English proficiency, improve the process for reporting and responding to complaints, and increase recreation and visitation." The PBNDS of 2011 is an important step in United States detention reform. Many revisions reflect efforts to tailor detention practices to the United States border's unique demands and circumstances. The PBNDS of 2011 revised detention standards among seven different sections. Although all sections detail essential contributions to improving the safety, security, order, care, activities, justice, and administration/management of U.S. border control, there are sections pertaining to the specific conditions of undocumented women.

The ICE Performance-Based National Detention Standards of 2011 are the first health care standards requiring ICE to specifically address women's medical care.

== Context ==
=== The Mexico-United States Border ===
In the last decade, the topic of immigration received a heightened amount of attention. Past presidents took distinct concern over undocumented immigration at the US-Mexico border and incorporated the topic into their campaign promises. As a result, the number of deportations has increased dramatically and, in turn, the number of migrant encounters at the US-Mexico border. Between 2009 and 2015, the Obama administration deported a record-high 2.4 million unauthorized immigrants. In 2016, ICE conducted 174,923 removals of individuals apprehended at or near the border or ports of entry—a 10,000 person increase from the prior year.

The growing amount of undocumented detainees raised concerns about detention centers' capacity to conduct proper treatment of each individual life. This became especially apparent when the COVID-19 pandemic began, when many immigrants crossing the US-Mexico border had limited access to healthcare due to the political, social, and economic stratification they undergo in ICE detention.

Many advocacy organizations, such as Border Angels and the American Civil Liberties Union (ACLU), pinpointed that the changes at the US-Mexico border would cause accelerated consequences for women.

=== Undocumented women in ICE detention ===
Women are known to be more vulnerable than men when migrating. Women detained in detention centers require a specific and often elevated amount of medical care. The ACLU published a brief documenting the problems and conditions that immigrant detainees face in detention facilities, the biggest problem being the issue of inadequate access to medical care.

Second, sexual assault and rape are widespread at the border. Although the true number of women raped at the Mexico–United States border remains unknown due to under-reporting, investigations have estimated that 60 percent of women are raped on their journey from Mexico into the United States.

Medical care and prevention of violence against women are two topics covered in the ICE PBNDS of 2011.

== Compliance ==
Although the PBNDS of 2011 is a contribution to improving the lives of detainees at the US-Mexico border, it do not ensure the safety of undocumented immigrants. The document sets forth expected outcomes that do not hold the same power as the National Detention Standards 2019 The National Detention Standards 2019 allow state or local authorities to set their own standards of care in which detention centers only have to adhere to a minimum while the PBNDS is the maximum. The Universal Declaration of Human Rights found that ICE was not compliant with a major portion of their Performance-Based National Detention Standards on medical care, pointing at huge violations of fundamental human rights.

In 2016, ICE revised several of the detention standards noted in the PBNDS 2011 to ensure consistency with federal legal and regulatory requirements and prior ICE policies and policy statements. However, in 2019 DHS's Office of Inspector General found that these processes were insufficient to sustain compliance with ICE's own standards.

Many facilities continue to not comply with the PBNDS of 2011 and neglect important sections that pertain to women's maternal and prenatal health care, sexual assault prevention and intervention, and treatment of transgender detainees.
