= Hiu Lui Ng =

- Traditional Chinese: 吳曉雷
Transcriptions
Standard Mandarin
- Hanyu Pinyin: Wú Xiǎoléi
Yue: Cantonese
- Yale Romanization: Ng̀h Hiúleuìh

Hiu Lui "Jason" Ng (吳曉雷; b. ca. 1975, d. August 5/6, 2008) was a New Yorker seized at his final green card interview, who died at age 34 while in custody of United States Immigration and Customs Enforcement (ICE) after symptoms of liver cancer were ignored. Being held at the Donald W. Wyatt Detention Facility in Rhode Island, Ng was awaiting deportation for having overstayed an earlier visa. The events leading up to his death were condemned by the editorial page of The New York Times and other persons and organizations. An exposé by The Washington Post highlighted Ng's case and identified tens of questionable deaths of ICE detainees between 2003 and 2008. These circumstances prompted the attempted introduction of federal legislation to ensure timely and effective medical care for immigration detainees.

== History ==
Ng came to New York City from Hong Kong in 1992 at age 17. He went to college, became a computer engineer, married a United States citizen, and fathered two American born sons. He entered the United States legally but had long overstayed his visa. The government rejected his pleas for political asylum. He missed a court date in 2001 when the order was sent to a non-existent address, and the judge ordered him deported when he did not show up at the hearing. His wife, a naturalized citizen, had petitioned to get him legal residency, but he was seized at his final green card interview on July 19, 2007 on the old deportation order.

While in immigration detention, Ng grew frail and complained for months of excruciating back pain. Officials at the Donald W. Wyatt Detention Facility in Rhode Island denied him an independent medical evaluation. A legal claim filed on Ng's behalf alleged that guards would drag him by his arms and legs because they claimed "he was only pretending to be sick" — the truth of which was later established in an inquiry. Ng's lawyers filed a petition of habeas corpus to see that he received suitable medical treatment which was declined by a judge, but nevertheless directed that Ng receive the medical treatment. When he finally saw a doctor, the diagnosis was terminal cancer and a broken spine. He died five days later. The State Medical Examiners office later declared that he died due to complications of metastatic hepatocellular carcinoma (liver cancer).

== Aftermath ==
Ng's lawyers demanded a criminal investigation in a letter to federal and state prosecutors in Rhode Island, Connecticut, Massachusetts and Vermont, and the Department of Homeland Security.

The editors of The New York Times condemned the death, writing that Mr. Ng "paid the ultimate price for overstaying a visa, and getting lost in a sprawling system that some have likened to the gulag."

Prompted by the death, Congressman José Enrique Serrano wrote to the ICE, in a letter dated August 13, 2008: "there is a certain standard we should live up to for everyone we have detained and it is outrageous that anyone would be treated in such a fashion while in your custody." Members of Rhode Island's congressional delegation requested a Homeland Security investigation into the death.

In response to a Washington Post article that highlighted the case of Ng and identified 30 questionable deaths among 83 detainee deaths in ICE agency custody through March 2008 (beginning in March 2003 when the agency was created), Representative Zoe Lofgren (D-CA) introduced the Detainee Basic Medical Bill (HR. 5950) in the House and Senator Robert Menendez (D-NJ) introduced the bill (S. 3005) in the Senate. Both bills requires "the Secretary of Homeland Security to establish procedures for the timely and effective delivery of medical and mental health care to all immigration detainees in custody"; the bills did not survive past committee.

== See also ==
- List of deaths in ICE detention
