= Charles Starr (bookbinder) =

American bookbinder and real estate developer

Charles Starr was an American early-nineteenth-century bookbinder and real estate developer in New York City. His bookbinding business was on Nassau Street. He was prosperous as indicated by the fact that he erected seven houses in the early 1830s on Sullivan Street in SoHo, Manhattan, New York City, including his own at 110 Sullivan Street, which was 32 feet wide, unusually large for the time. The houses are on land previously belonging to the farm of Nicholas Bayard, Peter Stuyvesant's brother-in-law. His extant erection of 116 Sullivan Street with its highly elaborate doorcase was declared a New York City landmark in 1973.
