= Invasion of Quebec (1775) =

Invasion of the American Revolutionary War

- Part of the American Revolutionary War
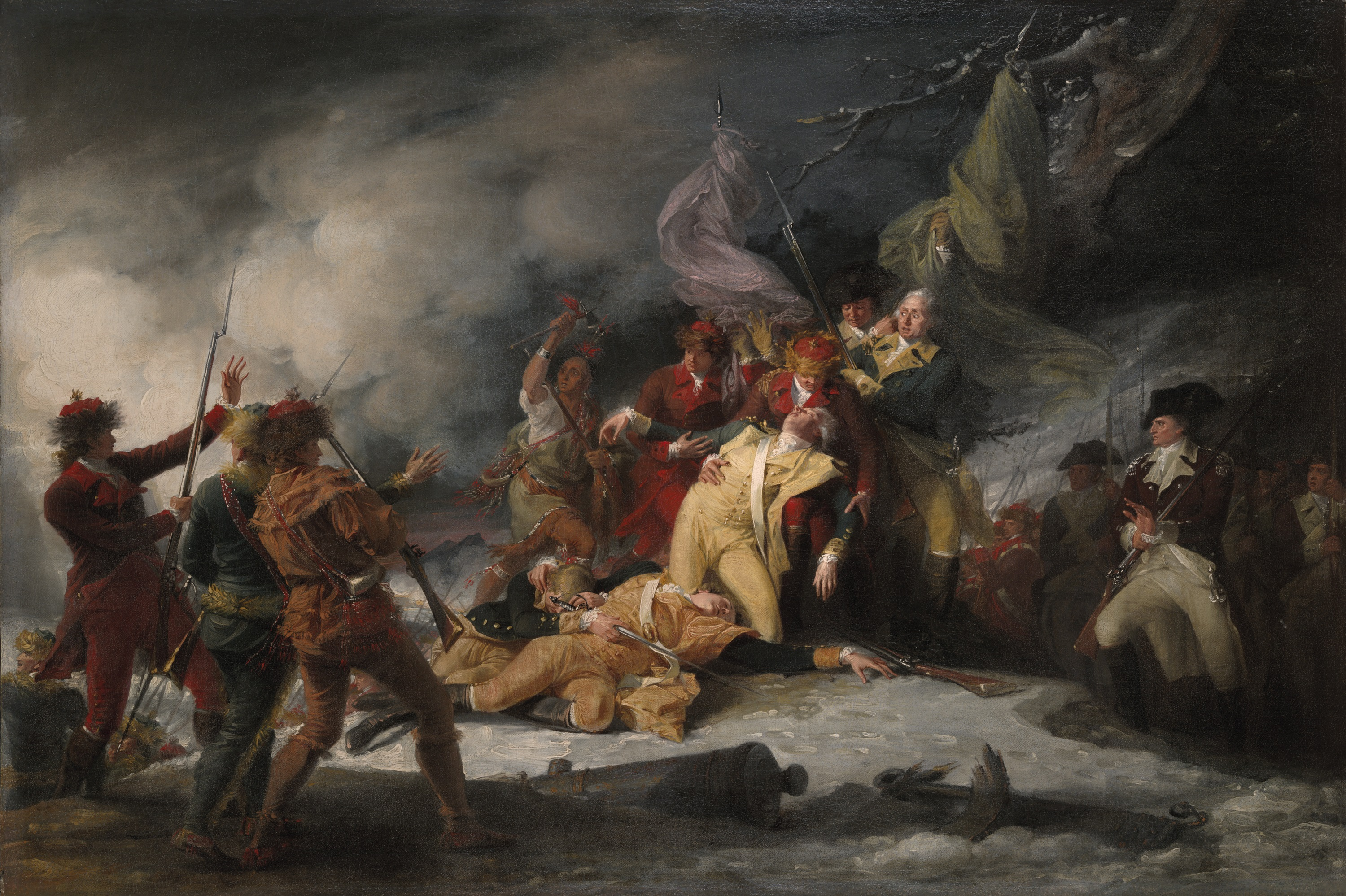
- The Death of General Montgomery in the Attack on Quebec, December 31, 1775 (1786)
Date	June 1775 – October 1776
Location	Primarily Lake Champlain and St. Lawrence River valleys
Result	British victory

Belligerents
United Colonies; Green Mountain Boys	Great Britain; Hesse-Kassel

Commanders and leaders
Philip Schuyler; Richard Montgomery †; John Thomas †; William Thompson (surrendered); John Sullivan; Benedict Arnold; David Wooster; James Livingston; Ethan Allen (surrendered)	Sir Guy Carleton; John Burgoyne

Strength
10,000	700–10,000+

Casualties and losses
400 killed; 650 wounded; 1,500 captured	100 killed; about 230 wounded; 600 captured

The Invasion of Quebec (June 1775 – October 1776, French: Invasion du Québec) was the first major military initiative by the newly formed Continental Army during the American Revolutionary War. The objective of the campaign was to seize the Province of Quebec (part of modern-day Canada and the modern US Great Lakes states) from Great Britain, and persuade French-speaking Canadiens to join the revolution on the side of the Thirteen Colonies. One expedition left Fort Ticonderoga under Richard Montgomery, besieged and captured Fort Saint-Jean, and very nearly captured British General Guy Carleton when taking Montreal. The other expedition, under Benedict Arnold, left Cambridge, Massachusetts, and traveled with great difficulty through the wilderness of Maine to Quebec City. The two forces joined there, but were defeated at the Battle of Quebec in December 1775.

Montgomery's expedition set out from Fort Ticonderoga in late August, and in mid-September began besieging Fort St. Johns, the main defensive point south of Montreal. After the fort was captured in November, Carleton abandoned Montreal, fleeing to Quebec City. Montgomery took control of Montreal before heading for Quebec, his army much-reduced by expiring enlistments. There he joined Arnold, who had left Cambridge in early September on an arduous trek through the wilderness that left his surviving troops starving and lacking supplies and equipment.

These forces joined before Quebec City in December, assaulting the city in a snowstorm on the last day of the year. The battle was a disaster for the Continental Army; Montgomery was killed and Arnold wounded, while the city's defenders suffered few casualties. Arnold then conducted an ineffectual siege on the city, during which successful propaganda campaigns boosted Loyalist sentiments, and General David Wooster's blunt administration of Montreal served to annoy both supporters and detractors of the Americans.

The British sent several thousand troops under General John Burgoyne, including Hessian auxiliaries, to reinforce the province in May 1776. General Carleton then launched a counter-offensive, driving the smallpox-weakened and disorganized Continental forces back to Fort Ticonderoga. The Continental Army, under Arnold's command, hindered the British advance sufficiently that an attack could not be mounted on Fort Ticonderoga in 1776. The end of the campaign set the stage for Burgoyne's 1777 campaign in the Hudson River valley.

== Naming ==
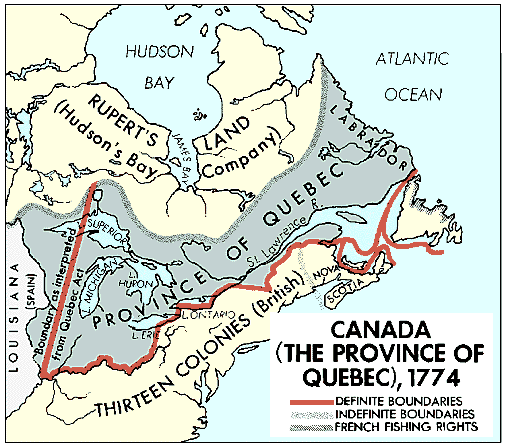
Province of Quebec in 1775

The objective of the American military campaign, control of the British province of Quebec, was frequently referred to as "Canada" in 1775. For example, the authorization by the Second Continental Congress to General Philip Schuyler for the campaign included language that, if it was "not disagreeable to the Canadians", to "immediately take possession of St. John's, Montreal, and any other parts of the Country", and to "pursue any other measures in Canada" that might "promote peace and security" of the colonies. The territory that Britain called Quebec was in large part French Canada until 1763, when France ceded it to Britain in the Treaty of Paris (1763), which formally ended the French and Indian War. (French leaders had surrendered the province to the British military in 1760.) The name "Quebec" is used in this article, except in quotations that specifically mention "Canada", to avoid confusion between this historic usage, and usage with respect to the modern nation of Canada.

== Background ==
In the spring of 1775, the American Revolutionary War began with the Battles of Lexington and Concord. The conflict was then at a standstill, with the British Army surrounded by colonial militia in the Siege of Boston. In May 1775, aware of the light defenses and presence of heavy weapons at the British Fort Ticonderoga, Benedict Arnold and Ethan Allen led a force of colonial militia that captured Fort Ticonderoga and Fort Crown Point, and raided Fort St. Johns, all of which were only lightly defended at the time. Ticonderoga and Crown Point were garrisoned by 1,000 Connecticut militia under the command of Benjamin Hinman in June.

=== Congressional authorization ===
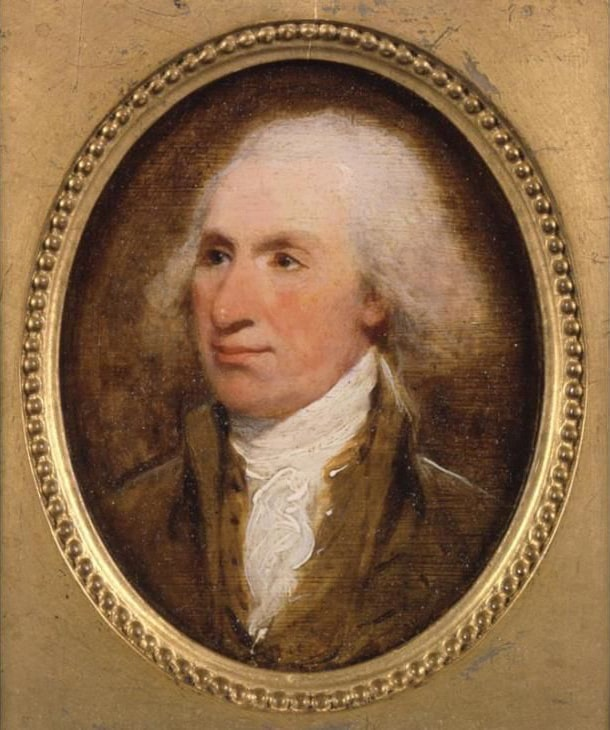
General Philip Schuyler

The First Continental Congress, meeting in 1774, had previously invited the French-Canadians to join in a second meeting of the Congress to be held in May 1775, in a public letter dated October 26, 1774. The Second Continental Congress sent a second such letter in May 1775, but there was no substantive response to either one.

Following the capture of Ticonderoga, Arnold and Allen noted that it was necessary to hold Ticonderoga as a defense against attempts by the British to militarily divide the colonies, and also noted that Quebec was poorly defended. They each separately proposed expeditions against Quebec, suggesting a force as small as 1200–1500 men would be sufficient to drive the British military from the province. Congress at first ordered the forts to be abandoned, prompting New York and Connecticut to provide troops and material for purposes that were essentially defensive in nature. Public outcries from across New England and New York challenged Congress to change its position. When it became clear that Guy Carleton, the governor of Quebec, was fortifying Fort St. Johns and seeking to draw the Iroquois of upstate New York into the conflict, Congress determined a more active position was needed. On June 27, 1775, Congress authorized General Philip Schuyler to investigate, and, if appropriate, begin an invasion. Benedict Arnold, passed over for its command, went to Boston and convinced General George Washington to send a supporting force to Quebec City under his command.

=== Defensive preparations ===
Following the raid on Fort St. Johns, General Carleton was keenly aware of the danger of invasion from the south, and requested, without immediate relief, reinforcements from General Thomas Gage in Boston. He set about raising local militias to aid in the defense of Montreal and Quebec City, which met with only limited success. In response to the capture of Ticonderoga and the raid on Fort St. Johns, he sent 700 troops to hold that fort on the Richelieu River south of Montreal, ordered construction of vessels for use on Lake Champlain, and recruited about one hundred Mohawk to assist in its defense. He himself oversaw the defense of Montreal, leading only 150 regulars, since he relied on Fort St. Johns for the main defense. The defense of Quebec City he left under the command of Lieutenant-Governor Cramahé.

=== Negotiations for Indian support ===
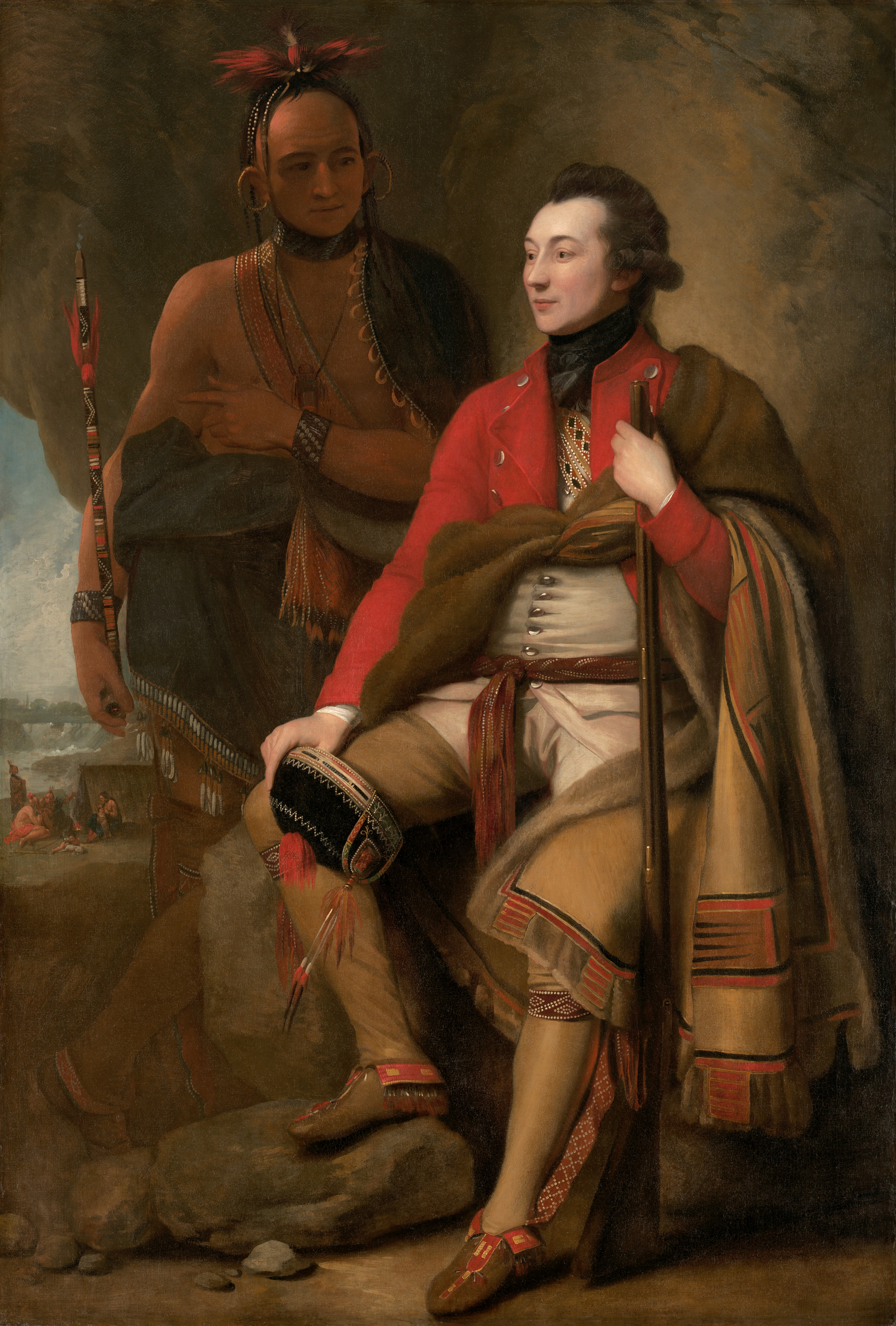
This painting by Benjamin West is usually identified as a portrait of Guy Johnson, although a biography of Sir William Johnson claims that it actually depicts Sir William, Guy's uncle.

Guy Johnson, a Loyalist and British Indian agent living in the Mohawk Valley in New York, was on quite friendly terms with the Iroquois of New York, and was concerned for the safety of himself and his family after it became clear that Patriot sentiment had taken hold in New York. Apparently convinced that he could no longer safely conduct Crown business, he left his estate in New York with about 200 Loyalist and Mohawk supporters. He first went to Fort Ontario, where, on June 17, he extracted from indigenous tribal leaders (mostly Iroquois and Huron) promises to assist in keeping supply and communication lines open in the area, and to support the British in "the annoyance of the enemy". From there he went to Montreal, where, in a meeting with General Carleton and more than 1,500 indigenous peoples, negotiated similar agreements, and delivered war belts "to be held ready for service". However, most of those involved in these agreements were Mohawks; the other tribes in the Iroquois Confederacy largely avoided these conferences, seeking to stay neutral. Many of the Mohawks remained in the Montreal area after the conference; however, when it seemed uncertain whether the Americans would actually launch an invasion in 1775, most of them had returned home by the middle of August.

The Continental Congress sought to keep the Six Nations out of the war. In July 1775, Samuel Kirkland, a missionary who was influential with the Oneidas, brought to them a statement from Congress: "we desire you to remain at home, and not join either side, but to keep the hatchet buried deep." While the Oneidas and Tuscaroras remained formally neutral, many individual Oneidas expressed sympathy with the rebels. News of Johnson's Montreal meeting prompted General Schuyler, who also had influence with the Oneidas, to call for a conference in Albany, to be held in mid-August. Attended by about 400 indigenous (primarily Oneidas and Tuscaroras, and only a few Mohawk), Schuyler and other Indian commissioners explained the issues dividing the colonies from Britain, emphasizing that the colonists were at war to preserve their rights, and were not attempting conquest. The assembled chiefs agreed to remain neutral, with one Mohawk chief saying, "It is a family affair" and that they would "sit still and see you fight ... out". They did, however, extract concessions from the Americans, including promises to address ongoing grievances like the encroachment of white settlers on their lands.

== Montgomery's expedition ==
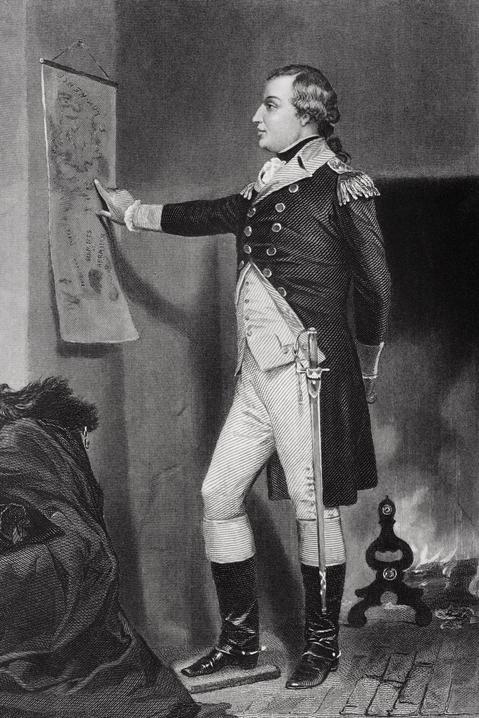
Brigadier General Richard Montgomery

The primary thrust of the invasion was to be led by General Schuyler, going up Lake Champlain to assault Montreal and then Quebec City. The expedition was to be composed of forces from New York, Connecticut, and New Hampshire, as well as the Green Mountain Boys under Seth Warner, with provisions supplied by New York. However, Schuyler was overcautious, and by mid-August the colonists were receiving reports that General Carleton was fortifying defensive positions outside Montreal, and that some Native tribes had joined with the British.

=== Approach to St. Johns ===
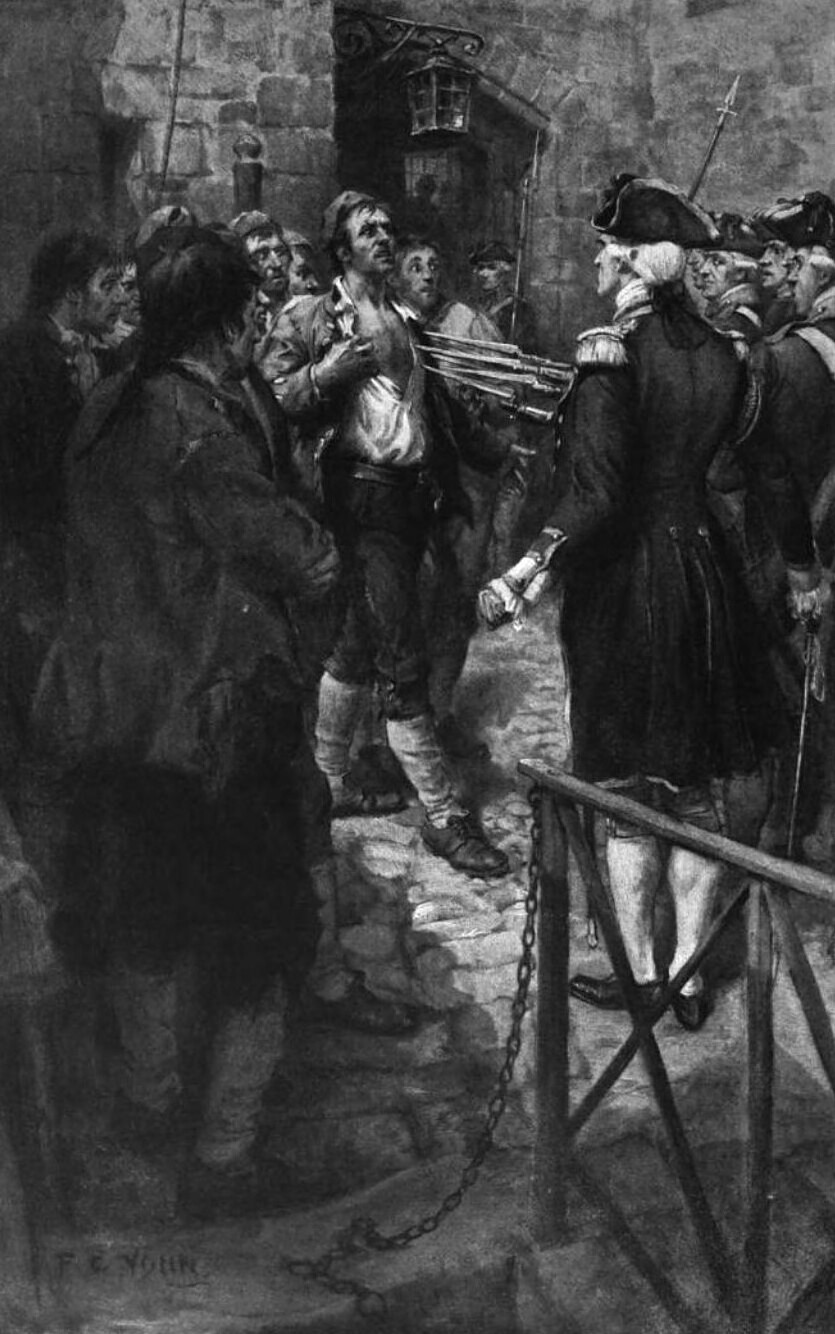
Artist's depiction of Ethan Allen after his capture

On August 25, while Schuyler was at the indigenous peoples conference, Montgomery received word that ships under construction at Fort St. Johns were nearing completion. Montgomery, taking advantage of Schuyler's absence (and in the absence of orders authorizing movement), led 1,200 troops that had mustered at Ticonderoga up to a forward position at Île aux Noix in the Richelieu River, arriving September 4. Schuyler, who was falling ill, caught up with the troops en route. He dispatched a letter to James Livingston, a Canadian prepared to raise local militia forces in support of the American effort, to circulate in the area south of Montreal. The next day, the forces went down the river to Fort St. Johns, where, after seeing the defenses and a brief skirmish in which both sides suffered casualties, they withdrew to Île aux Noix. The skirmish, which involved mostly indigenous people on the British side, was not supported from the fort, prompting the Indians to withdraw from the conflict. Any additional indigenous support for the British was further halted by the timely arrival of Oneidas in the area, who intercepted a Mohawk war party on the move from Caughnawaga toward St. John's. The Oneidas convinced the party to return to their village, where Guy Johnson, Daniel Claus, and Joseph Brant had arrived in an attempt to gain the Mohawks' assistance. Refusing to meet directly with Johnson and Claus, the Oneidas explained to Brant and the Mohawks the terms of the Albany agreement. Brant and the British agents left without any promises of support. (In a more formal snub of the British, the war belt that Guy Johnson gave to the Iroquois in July was turned over to the American Indian commissioners in December 1775.)

Following this first skirmish, General Schuyler became too ill to continue, so he turned command over to Montgomery. Schuyler left for Fort Ticonderoga several days later. After another false start, and the arrival of another 800–1000 men from Connecticut, New Hampshire, and New York, as well as some of the Green Mountain Boys, Montgomery finally began besieging Fort St. Jean on September 17, cutting off its communications with Montreal and capturing supplies intended for the fort. Ethan Allen was captured the following week in the Battle of Longue-Pointe, when, overstepping instructions to merely raise local militia, he attempted to take Montreal with a small force of men. This event resulted in a brief upturn in militia support for the British; but the effects were relatively short-lived, with many deserting again in the following days. After an attempt by General Carleton to relieve the siege failed on October 30, the fort finally surrendered on November 3.

== Occupation of Montreal begins ==
American attack on Quebec: routes of the Arnold and Montgomery expeditions

Montgomery then led his troops north and occupied Saint Paul's Island in the Saint Lawrence River on November 8, crossing to Pointe-Saint-Charles on the following day, where he was greeted as a liberator. Montreal fell without any significant fighting on November 13, as Carleton, deciding that the city was indefensible (and having suffered significant militia desertion upon the news of the fall of St. Johns), withdrew. He barely escaped capture, as some Americans had crossed the river downstream of the city, and winds prevented his fleet from departing right away. When his fleet neared Sorel, it was approached by a boat carrying a truce flag. The boat carried a demand for surrender, claiming that gun batteries downstream would otherwise destroy the convoy. Based on uncertain knowledge of how real these batteries were, Carleton elected to sneak off the ship, after ordering the dumping of powder and ammunition if surrender was deemed necessary. (There were batteries in place, but not nearly as powerful as those claimed.) On November 19, the British fleet surrendered; Carleton, disguised as a common man, made his way to Quebec City. The captured ships included prisoners that the British had taken; among these was Moses Hazen, a Massachusetts-born expatriate with property near Fort St. Jean whose poor treatment by the British turned him against them. Hazen, who had combat experience in the French and Indian War and went on to lead the 2nd Canadian Regiment throughout the war, joined Montgomery's army.

Before departing Montreal for Quebec City, Montgomery published messages to the inhabitants that the Congress wanted Quebec to join them, and entered into discussions with American sympathizers with the aim of holding a provincial convention for the purpose of electing delegates to Congress. He also wrote to General Schuyler, requesting that a Congressional delegation be sent to take up diplomatic activities.

Much of Montgomery's army departed due to expiring enlistments after the fall of Montreal. He then used some of the captured boats to move towards Quebec City with about 300 troops on November 28, leaving about 200 in Montreal under the command of General David Wooster. Along the way, he picked up James Livingston's newly created 1st Canadian Regiment of about 200 men.

== Arnold's expedition ==
Benedict Arnold, who had been rejected for leadership of the Champlain Valley expedition, returned to Cambridge, Massachusetts, and approached George Washington with the idea of a supporting eastern invasion force aimed at Quebec City. Washington approved the idea, and gave Arnold 1,100 men, including Daniel Morgan's riflemen, for the effort. Arnold's force sailed from Newburyport, Massachusetts to the mouth of the Kennebec River and then upriver to Fort Western (present day Augusta, Maine).

Arnold's expedition was a success in that he was able to bring a body of troops to the gates of Quebec City. However, the expedition was beset by troubles as soon as it left the last significant outposts of civilization in present-day Maine. There were numerous difficult portages as the troops moved up the Kennebec River, and the boats they were using frequently leaked, spoiling gunpowder and food supplies. The height of land between the Kennebec and the Chaudière River was a swampy tangle of lakes and streams, where the traversal was complicated by bad weather, resulting in one quarter of the troops turning back. The descent down the Chaudière resulted in the destruction of more boats and supplies as the inexperienced troops were unable to control the boats in the fast-moving waters.

By the time Arnold reached the outskirts of civilization along the Saint Lawrence River in November, his force was reduced to 600 starving men. They had traveled almost 400 miles through untracked wilderness. When Arnold and his troops finally reached the Plains of Abraham on November 14, Arnold sent a negotiator with a white flag to demand their surrender, but to no avail. The Americans, with no cannons, and barely fit for action, faced a fortified city. Arnold, after hearing of a planned sortie from the city, decided on November 19 to withdraw to Pointe-aux-Trembles to wait for Montgomery, who had recently captured Montreal. As he headed upriver, Carleton returned to Quebec by river following his defeat at Montreal.

On December 2, Montgomery finally came down the river from Montreal with 500 troops, bringing captured British supplies and winter clothing. The two forces united, and plans were made for an attack on the city. Three days later the Continental Army again stood on the Plains of Abraham and began to besiege the city of Quebec.

== Battle and siege of Quebec ==
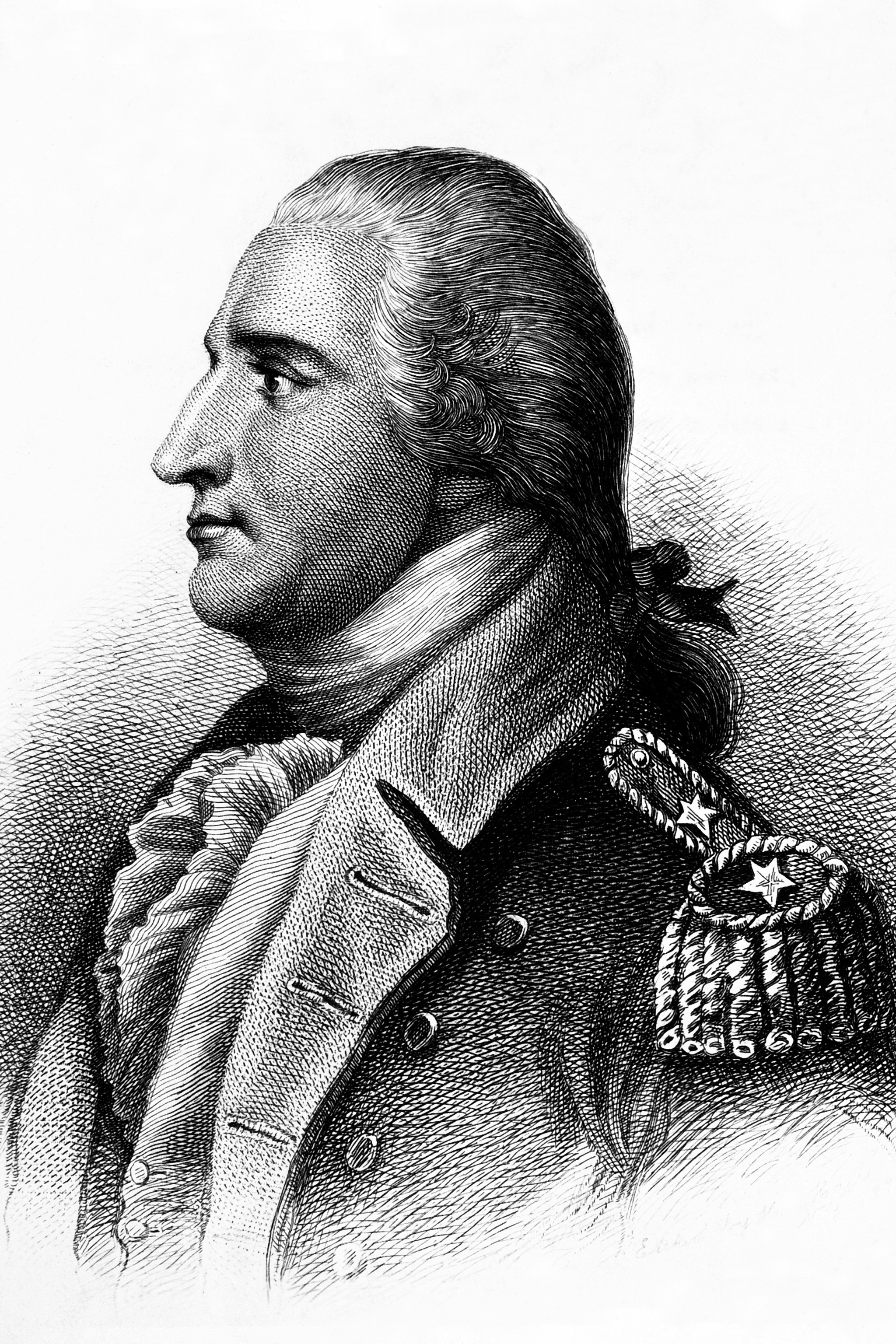
Benedict Arnold was injured in the battle of Quebec.

While planning the attack on the city, Christophe Pélissier, a Frenchman living near Trois-Rivières, came to meet with Montgomery. Pélissier, who was politically supportive of the American cause, operated an ironworks at Saint-Maurice. Montgomery discussed the idea of holding the provincial convention with him. Pélissier recommended against holding a convention until after Quebec City had been taken, as the habitants would not feel free to act in that way until their security was better assured. The two did agree to have Pélissier's ironworks provide munitions for the siege, which he did until the Americans retreated in May 1776 (at which time Pélissier also fled, eventually returning to France).

Montgomery joined Arnold and James Livingston in an assault on Quebec City during a snowstorm on December 31, 1775. Outnumbered and lacking any sort of tactical advantage, the Americans were soundly defeated by Carleton. Montgomery was killed, Arnold was wounded, and many men were taken prisoner, including Daniel Morgan. Following the battle, Arnold sent Moses Hazen and Edward Antill, another expatriate American, to report the defeat and request support to Wooster in Montreal, and also to the Congress in Philadelphia.

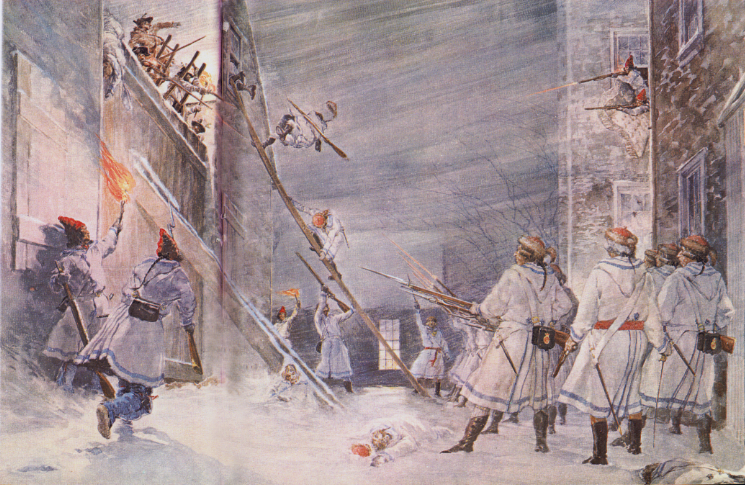
Defending Quebec from an American attack, December 1775

Carleton chose not to pursue the Americans, opting instead to stay within the fortifications of the city, and await reinforcements that might be expected to arrive when the river thawed in the spring. Arnold maintained a somewhat ineffectual siege over the city, until March 1776, when he was ordered to Montreal and replaced by General Wooster. During these months, the besieging army suffered from difficult winter conditions, and smallpox began to travel more significantly through the camp. These losses were offset by the arrival each month of small companies of reinforcements. On March 14, Jean-Baptiste Chasseur, a miller living downstream from the city, entered Quebec and informed Carleton that there were 200 men on the south side of the river ready to act against the Americans. These men and more were mobilized, but an advance force was defeated in the Battle of Saint-Pierre by a detachment of pro-American local militia that were stationed on the south side of the river.

Congress, even before it learned of the defeat at Quebec, had authorized as many as 6,500 additional troops for service there. Throughout the winter, troops trickled into Montreal and the camp outside Quebec City. By the end of March, the besieging army had grown to almost 3,000, although almost one quarter of these were unfit for service, mainly due to smallpox. An American veteran of the invasion, John Joseph Henry, later recalled that American troops inoculated themselves against smallpox during the campaign "by laceration under the finger nails by means of pins or needles." This practice continued even after military officials attempted to prohibit it, as it was reducing the invasion force's combat efficiency. Furthermore, James Livingston and Moses Hazen, commanding the 500 Canadians in the army, were pessimistic about the loyalty of their men and the cooperation of the population due to persistent Loyalist propaganda.

Congress was conflicted about requests that Arnold made for a more experienced general officer to lead the siege effort. They first chose Charles Lee, a major general with experience in the British Army, to lead the troops in Quebec in January. One week later, they retracted the step, and instead sent Lee into the southern states to direct efforts against an anticipated British attack there. (The British attempt was thwarted in the June 1776 Battle of Sullivan's Island.) They finally settled in March 1776 on Major General John Thomas, who had served in the army besieging Boston.

== Discontent in Montreal ==
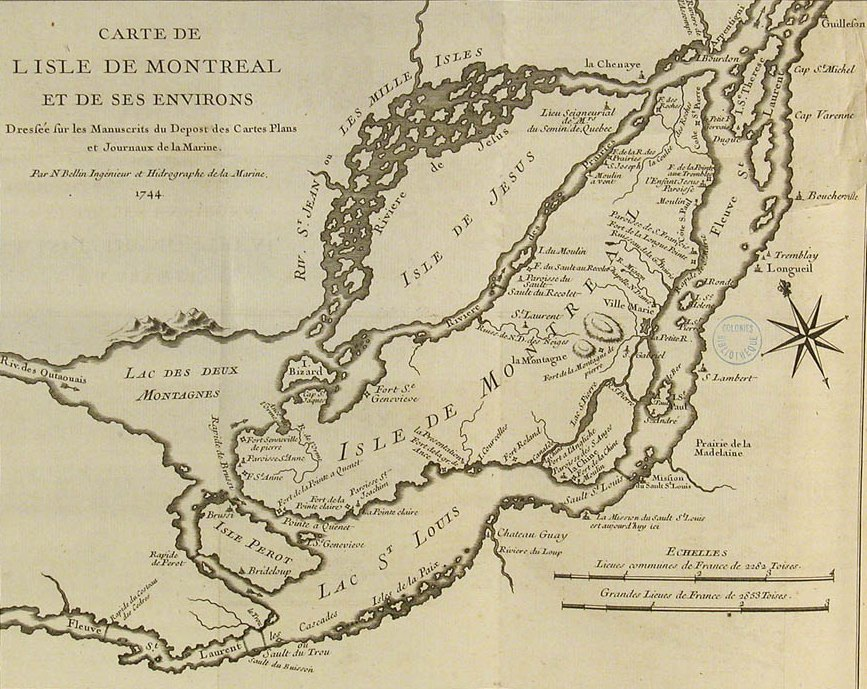
A map of Montreal in 1744

When General Montgomery left Montreal for Quebec City, he left the administration of the city in the hands of Connecticut's Brigadier General David Wooster. While Wooster at first had decent relations with the community, he took a number of steps that caused the local population to come to dislike the American military presence. After promising American ideals to the population, he began arresting Loyalists and threatening arrest and punishment of anyone opposed to the American cause. He also disarmed several communities, and attempted to force local militia members to surrender their Crown commissions. Those who refused were arrested and imprisoned at Fort Chambly. These and similar acts, combined with the fact that the Americans were paying for supplies and services with paper money rather than coin, served to disillusion the local population about the entire American enterprise. On March 20, Wooster left to take command of the forces at Quebec City, leaving Moses Hazen, who had raised the 2nd Canadian Regiment, in command of Montreal until Arnold arrived on April 19.

On April 29, a delegation consisting of three members of the Continental Congress, along with an American Jesuit priest, John Carroll (later the first Catholic bishop in the United States) and a French printer from Philadelphia, arrived in Montreal. The Continental Congress had assigned this delegation the tasks of assessing the situation in Quebec and attempting to sway public opinion to their cause. This delegation, which included Benjamin Franklin, was largely unsuccessful in its efforts, as relations were already significantly damaged. The delegation had not brought any hard currency to alleviate debts to the population that were accumulating. Efforts to turn the Catholic clergy to their cause failed, as the local priests pointed out that the Quebec Act passed by the British Parliament had given them what they wanted. Fleury Mesplet, the printer, while he had set up his press, did not have time to produce anything before events began to overtake the delegation. Franklin and Carroll left Montreal on May 11, following news that the American forces at Quebec City were in panicked retreat, to return to Philadelphia. Samuel Chase and Charles Carroll, the other two delegates, analyzed the military situation in the area south and east of Montreal, finding it a good place to set up a defense. On May 27, they wrote a report to Congress on the situation, and left for the south.

=== The Cedars ===
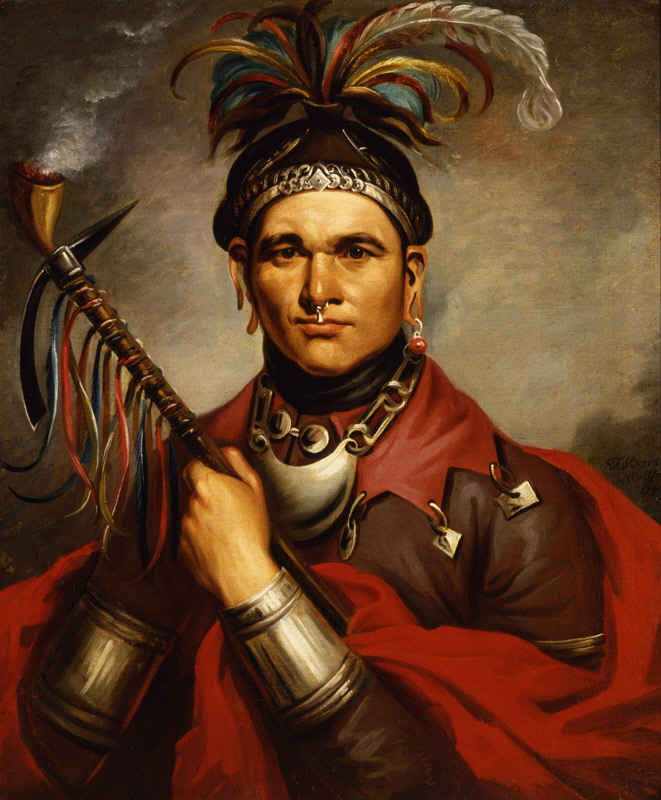
Cornplanter, a Seneca chief, supported the British side, and may have fought in this campaign.

Upriver from Montreal were a series of small British garrisons that the Americans had not concerned themselves with during the occupation. As spring approached, bands of Cayuga, Seneca, and Mississauga warriors began to gather at Oswegatchie, one of these garrisons, giving the commander there, Captain George Forster, a force with which to cause trouble for the Americans. Forster had recruited them on the recommendation of a Loyalist who had escaped from Montreal. Furthermore, while General Wooster, much to the annoyance of both Patriot and Loyalist merchants, had refused to permit trade with the Indians upriver out of fear that supplies sent in that direction would be used by the British forces there, the congressional delegation reversed his decision and supplies began flowing out of the city up the river.

To prevent the flow of supplies to the British forces upriver, and in response to rumours of indigenous peoples gathering, Moses Hazen detached Colonel Timothy Bedel and 390 men to a position 40 miles (64 km) upriver at Les Cèdres (English: The Cedars), where they built a stockaded defense works. Colonel Forster was made aware of these movements by Indian spies and Loyalists, and on May 15 began to move downriver with a mixed force of about 250 Natives, militia, and regulars. In an odd series of encounters known as the Battle of the Cedars, Bedel's lieutenant Isaac Butterfield surrendered this entire force without a fight on the 18th, and another 100 men brought as reinforcements also surrendered after a brief skirmish on the 19th.

=== Quinze-Chênes ===
On receiving news of Butterfield's capture, Arnold immediately began assembling a force to recover them, which he entrenched in a position at Lachine, just upriver from Montreal. Forster, who had left the captives in the stockade at Les Cèdres, moved closer to Montreal with a force now numbering around 500, until May 24 when he received intelligence of Arnold's location, and that Arnold was expecting additional forces which would significantly outnumber his. Since his force was dwindling in size, he negotiated an agreement with his captives to exchange them for British prisoners taken during the Siege of Fort St. Jean. After a brief exchange of cannon fire at Quinze-Chênes, Arnold also agreed to the exchange, which took place between May 27 and 30.

== Reinforcements arrive at Quebec City ==
=== American troops ===
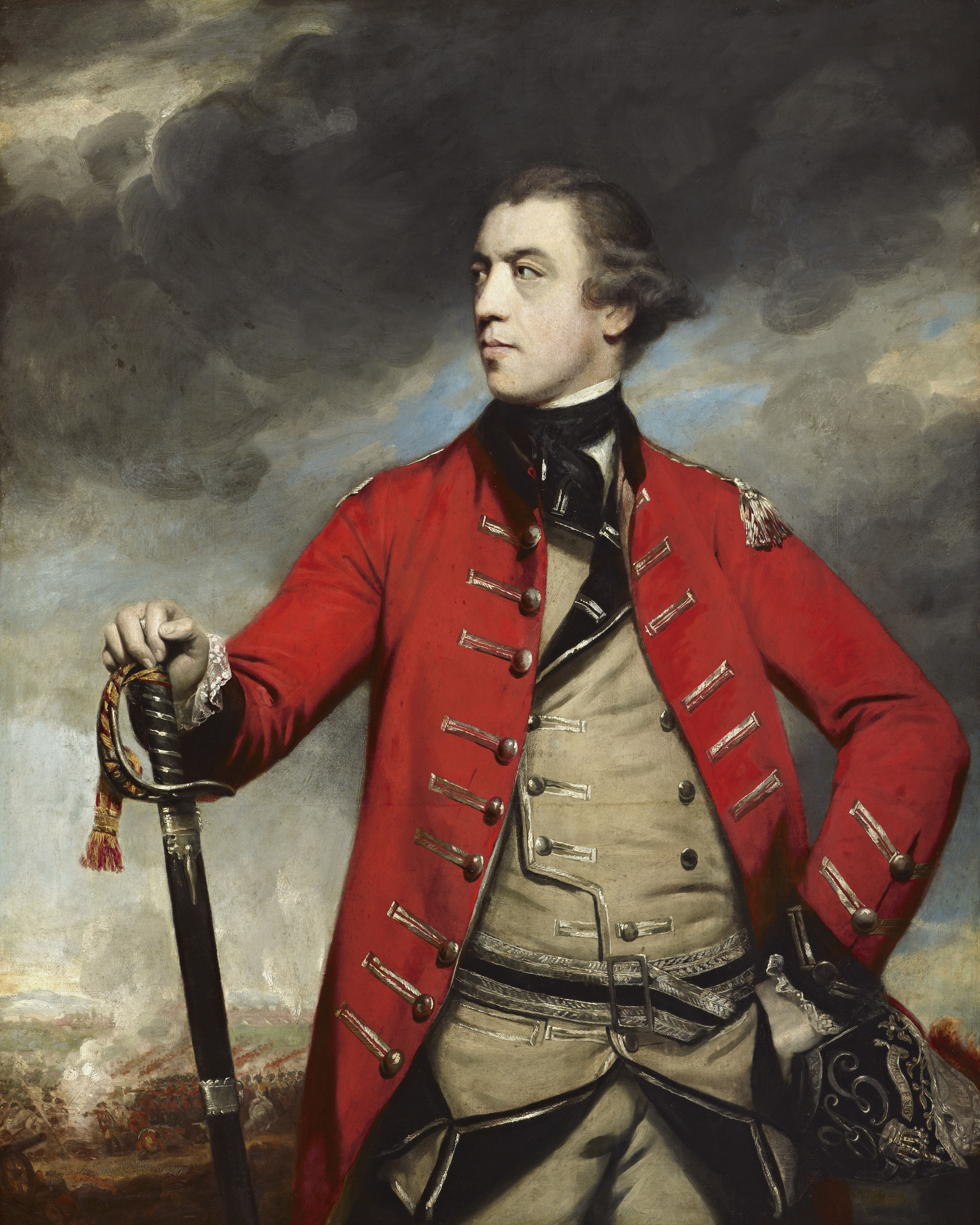
Portrait of John Burgoyne by Joshua Reynolds, 1766. Burgoyne arrived with the reinforcements

General John Thomas was unable to move north until late April, due to the icy conditions on Lake Champlain. Concerned about reports of troop readiness and sickness, he made requests to Washington for additional men to follow him while he waited for conditions to improve. Upon his arrival in Montreal, he learned that many men had promised to stay only until April 15, and most of these were insistent on returning home. This was compounded by relatively low enrollments in regiments actually raised for service in Quebec. One regiment with an authorized strength of 750, sailed north with but 75 men. These deficiencies prompted Congress to order Washington to send more troops north. In late April, Washington ordered ten regiments, led by Generals William Thompson and John Sullivan, to go north from New York. This significantly reduced Washington's forces that were preparing for a British attack there. This also exposed transport problems: there were insufficient sailing hands on Lakes George and Champlain to easily move all of these men. Furthermore, there was also a shortage of supplies in Quebec, and much of the shipping was needed to move provisions instead of men. As a result, Sullivan's men were held up at Ticonderoga, and Sullivan did not reach Sorel until the beginning of June.

General Wooster arrived in the American camp outside Quebec City in early April with reinforcements. Reinforcements continued to arrive from the south in modest numbers, until General Thomas arrived at the end of April and assumed command of a force that was nominally over 2,000 strong, but in reality was significantly diminished by the effects of smallpox and the hardships of the Canadian winter. Rumors began circulating on May 2 that British ships were coming up the river. Thomas decided on May 5 to evacuate the sick to Trois-Rivières, with the rest of the forces to withdraw as soon as practical. Late on that day he received intelligence that 15 ships were 40 leagues below the city, awaiting favorable conditions to come up the river. The pace of camp evacuation took on a sense of urgency early the next day when ship's masts were spotted; the wind had changed, and 3 ships of the fleet had reached the city.

=== British troops ===
After news of Lexington and Concord reached London, the government of Lord North, realizing it would require the support of foreign troops to combat the rebellion, began negotiating with European allies for the use of their troops in North America. Requests to Catherine the Great for Russian troops were refused, but a number of German principalities were prepared to offer theirs. Of the 50,000 troops that Britain raised in 1776, nearly one third came from a handful of these principalities; the number of troops from Hesse-Cassel and Hesse-Hanau caused them to be widely referred to as Hessians. Of these 50,000, about 11,000 were destined for service in Quebec. Troops from Hesse-Hanau and Brunswick-Lüneburg sailed in February 1776 for Cork, where they joined a convoy carrying British troops that sailed in early April.

Carleton, having been informed of pace of activity in the American camp, rapidly unloaded reinforcements from the arrived ships, and around noon marched with a force of about 900 troops to test the Americans. The American response was essentially panic; a disorganized retreat began that might have ended even more disastrously for the Americans had Carleton pressed his advantage. Hoping to win over the rebels with a lenient attitude, he was content to send ships up the river to harass the Americans, and to possibly cut them off. He also captured a number of Americans, mostly sick and wounded, but also a detachment of troops that had been abandoned on the south side of the St. Lawrence. The Americans, in their hurry to get away, left numerous valuable military effects, including cannon and gunpowder, in their wake. They regrouped on the 7th at Deschambault, about 40 miles upriver from Quebec City. Thomas held a war council there, in which most of the leadership favored retreat. Thomas opted to retain 500 men at Deschambault while sending the rest to Sorel, and also sent word to Montreal for assistance, since many of the troops had little more than the clothes on their backs and a few days rations.

The Congressional delegation in Montreal, upon hearing this news, determined that holding the Saint Lawrence would no longer be possible, and dispatched only a small number of troops toward Deschambault. Thomas, after waiting for six days for word from Montreal and hearing none, began to withdraw toward Trois-Rivières, but not before having to fight off skirmishers from forces landed from British ships on the river. They reached Trois-Rivières on May 15, where they left the sick, and a detachment of New Jersey troops to defend them. By the 18th, the remaining troops joined reinforcements under General Thompson at Sorel, where on the 21st, a council was held with the Congressional delegates. Thomas contracted smallpox that same day, and died on June 2. He was replaced by Thompson.

== Carleton's counteroffensive ==
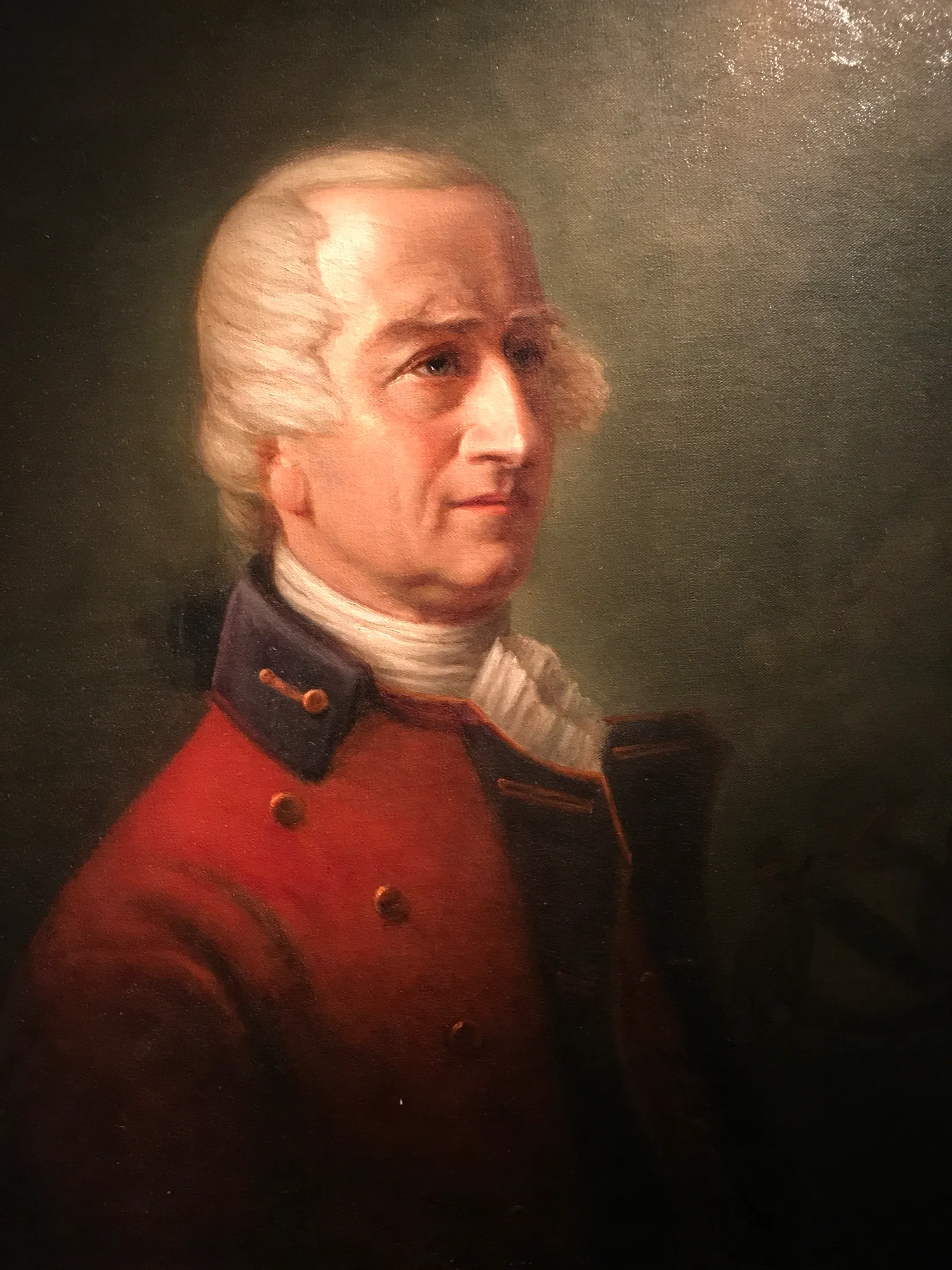
Guy Carleton

=== Trois-Rivières ===
On May 6, 1776, a small squadron of British ships under Captain Charles Douglas had arrived to relieve Quebec with supplies and 3,000 troops, precipitating the Americans' retreat to Sorel. However, General Carleton did not take significant offensive measures until May 22, when he sailed to Trois-Rivières with the 47th and 29th regiments. While hearing news of Forster's success at Les Cèdres, instead of pushing ahead he returned to Quebec City, leaving Allen Maclean in command at Trois-Rivières. There he met Lieutenant General John Burgoyne, who had arrived on June 1 with a large force of mostly Irish recruits, Hessian allies, and a war chest of money.

The Americans at Sorel, on receiving word that a force of "only 300 men" was at Trois-Rivières, thought that they should be able to send a force from Sorel to take Trois-Rivières back. Unaware that major British reinforcements had arrived, and ignorant of the geography around the town, General Thompson led 2,000 men first into a swamp, and then into the teeth of a reinforced, entrenched British army. This disaster included the capture of Thompson and many of his senior officers, as well as 200 men and most of the ships used for the expedition, and forecast the end of the American occupation of Quebec. The American forces at Sorel, now under the command of General Sullivan, retreated. Carleton once again did not press his advantage, even going so far as to eventually return the captives to New York, in great comfort, in August.

=== Retreat to Crown Point ===
Early on June 14, Carleton finally sailed his army up the river to Sorel. Arriving late in the day, they discovered that the Americans had abandoned Sorel just that morning, and were retreating up the Richelieu River valley toward Chambly and St. Johns. Unlike the departure from Quebec City, the Americans left in a somewhat orderly manner, although some units were separated from the main force by the arrival of Carleton's fleet, and were forced to march to Montreal to join Arnold's forces. Carleton directed General Burgoyne and 4,000 troops to move up the Richelieu after the retreating Americans, while Carleton continued sailing toward Montreal.

In Montreal, Arnold was ignorant of the events taking place downriver, having recently finished dealing with Forster. A messenger he sent downriver toward Sorel on June 15 for news from General Sullivan spotted Carleton's fleet, escaped to shore, and returned with the news to Montreal on a stolen horse. Within four hours, Arnold and the American forces garrisoned around Montreal had abandoned the city (but not before trying to burn it down), leaving it in the hands of the local militia. Carleton's fleet arrived in Montreal on June 17.

Arnold's troops caught up with the main army near St. Jean on the 17th. Sullivan's army was in no condition to fight, and after a brief council, the decision was made to retreat to Crown Point. The army reportedly got away from St. Jean almost literally moments before the vanguard of Burgoyne's army arrived on the scene.

The remnants of the American army arrived at Crown Point in early July, ending a campaign described as "a heterogeneal concatenation of the most peculiar and unparalleled rebuffs and sufferings that are perhaps to be found in the annals of any nation", by Isaac Senter, a doctor who experienced much of the campaign. Unfortunately for the Americans, the campaign had not quite ended, since the British were still on the move.

=== Shipbuilding and politics ===
The Americans had been careful at every step of the retreat up the Richelieu and across Lake Champlain to deny the British any significant shipping, burning or sinking boats they did not take with them. This forced the British to spend several months building ships. Carleton reported to London on September 28 that "I expect our Fleet will soon sail with hopes of success should they come to action". General Arnold, when he and Ethan Allen captured Fort Ticonderoga, had established a small navy that was still patrolling Lake Champlain.

While the British assembled a navy to counteract Arnold's, Carleton dealt with matters in Montreal. Even before the Americans retreated from Quebec City, he formed committees to look into the roles played by local Patriot sympathizers, sending them out into the countryside to arrest active participants in the American action, including those who had detained Loyalists. When he arrived in Montreal, similar commissions were set up.

=== Valcour Island ===
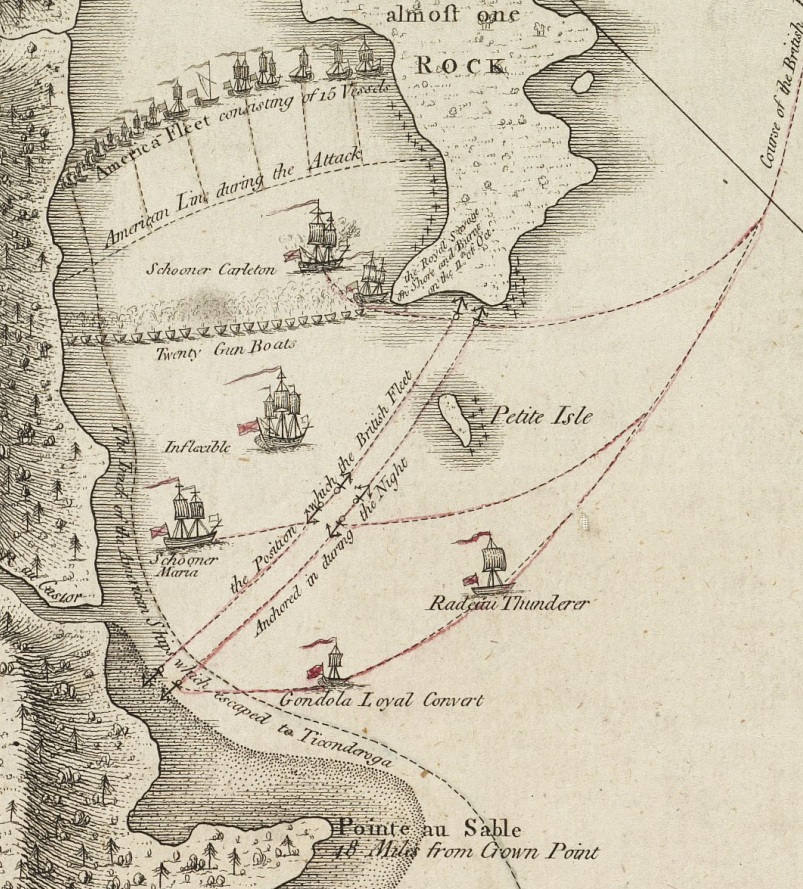
A map detail showing the formations at the Battle of Valcour Island

General Horatio Gates was given command of the Continental Army's northern forces in early July. He promptly moved the bulk of the army to Ticonderoga, leaving a force of about 300 at Crown Point. The army was busied improving the defenses at Ticonderoga, while Arnold was tasked with building up the American fleet at Crown Point. Throughout the summer, reinforcements poured into Ticonderoga, until the army was estimated to be 10,000 strong. A smaller army of shipwrights labored at Skenesborough (present-day Whitehall) to build the ships needed to defend the lake.

Carleton began to move on October 7. By October 9, the British fleet was on Lake Champlain. In a naval action between Valcour Island and the western shore, beginning on October 11, the British inflicted heavy damage to Arnold's fleet, forcing him to withdraw to Crown Point. Feeling that Crown Point would be inadequate protection against a sustained British attack, he then withdrew to Ticonderoga. British forces occupied Crown Point on October 17.

Carleton's troops remained at Crown Point for two weeks, with some troops advancing to within three miles of Ticonderoga, apparently in an attempt to draw Gates' army out. On November 2, they pulled out of Crown Point and withdrew to winter quarters in Quebec.

== Aftermath ==
The invasion of Quebec ended as a disaster for the Americans, but Arnold's actions on the retreat from Quebec and his improvised navy on Lake Champlain were widely credited with delaying a full-scale British counter-thrust until 1777. Numerous factors were put forward as reasons for the invasion's failure, including the high rate of smallpox among American troops. Carleton was heavily criticized by Burgoyne for not pursuing the American retreat from Quebec more aggressively. Due to these criticisms and the fact that Carleton was disliked by Lord George Germain, the British Secretary of State for the Colonies and the official in King George's government responsible for directing the war, command of the 1777 offensive was given to General Burgoyne instead (an action that prompted Carleton to tender his resignation as Governor of Quebec).

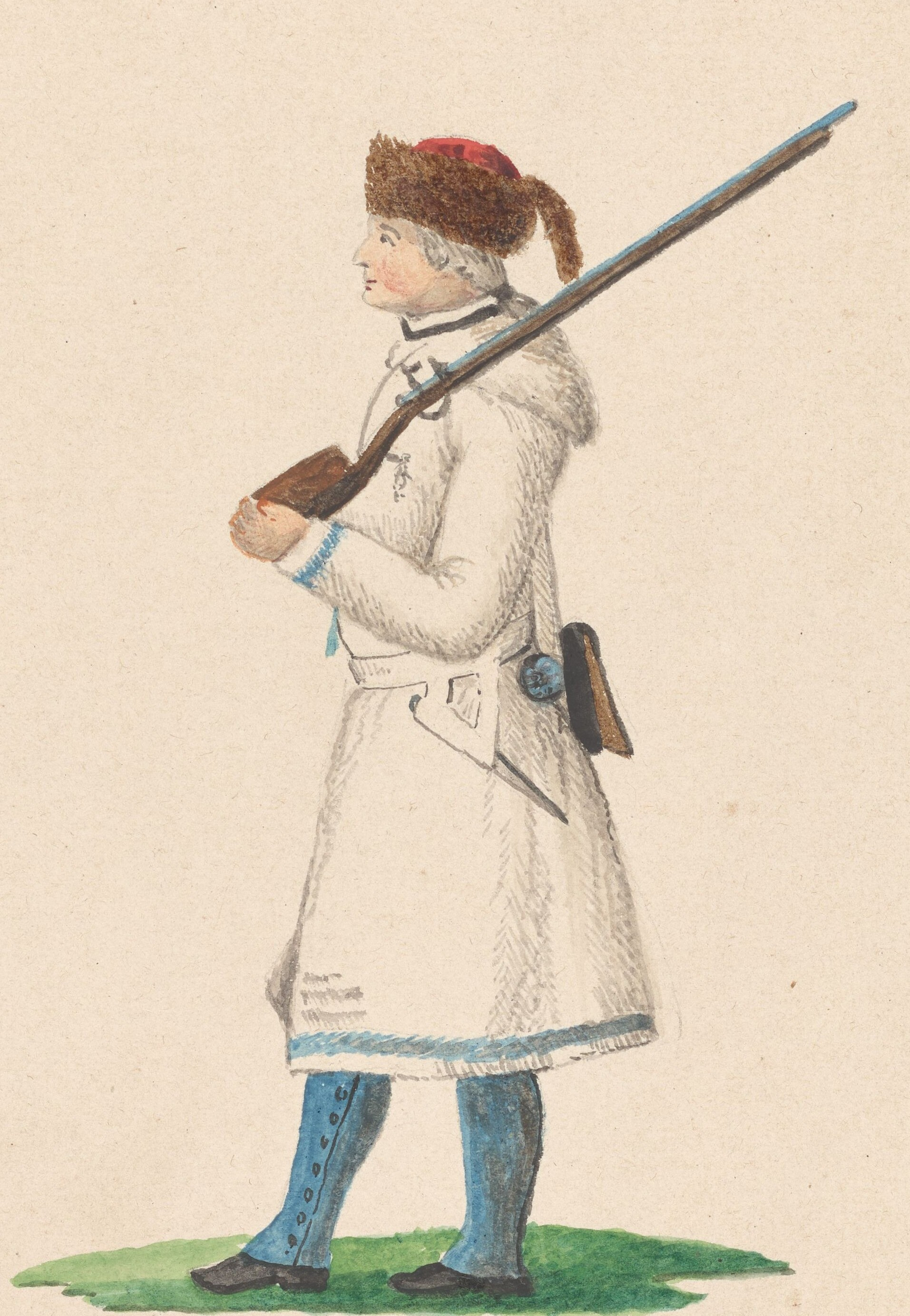
1778 watercolour of a British soldier wearing winter uniform in Canada

A significant portion of the Continental forces at Fort Ticonderoga were sent south with Generals Gates and Arnold in November to bolster Washington's faltering defense of New Jersey. (He had already lost New York City, and by early December had crossed the Delaware River into Pennsylvania, leaving the British free to operate in New Jersey.) Conquering Quebec and other British colonies remained an objective of Congress throughout the war. However, George Washington, who had supported this invasion, considered any further expeditions a low priority that would divert too many men and resources away from the main war in the Thirteen Colonies, so further attempts at expeditions to Quebec were never fully realized.

Several hundred men of British and French descent continued to serve in the ranks of the Continental Army following the retreat of 1776. Under Livingston and Hazen, they served in various theaters of the war, including the siege of Yorktown. Unable to recover the property they lost in the Province of Quebec, many remained in the army out of necessity and continually pushed American political and military authorities to live up to their financial pledges. At war's end, Canadiens reunited with women and children who had survived on rations in Albany and Fishkill, New York; some accepted the opportunity to settle a northern New York tract designated for "refugees" from Canada and Nova Scotia.

During the Paris peace talks, American negotiators, including Benjamin Franklin, unsuccessfully demanded all of Quebec as part of the war spoils. In the end, only portions of southwestern Quebec were ceded by Britain to the new United States. In the War of 1812 the Americans launched another invasion of British North America, again expecting the local populace to support them. That failed invasion is regarded as a significant event in Canadian history; it has even been claimed as the birth of modern Canadian identity.

== See also ==
- American Revolutionary War#Early engagements
- Fenian raids
- Heritage Minutes
- History of Canada
- History of the United States
- List of American Revolutionary War battles
- Military history of Canada
- Military history of the United States
