= Sullivan Street =

Street in Manhattan, New York

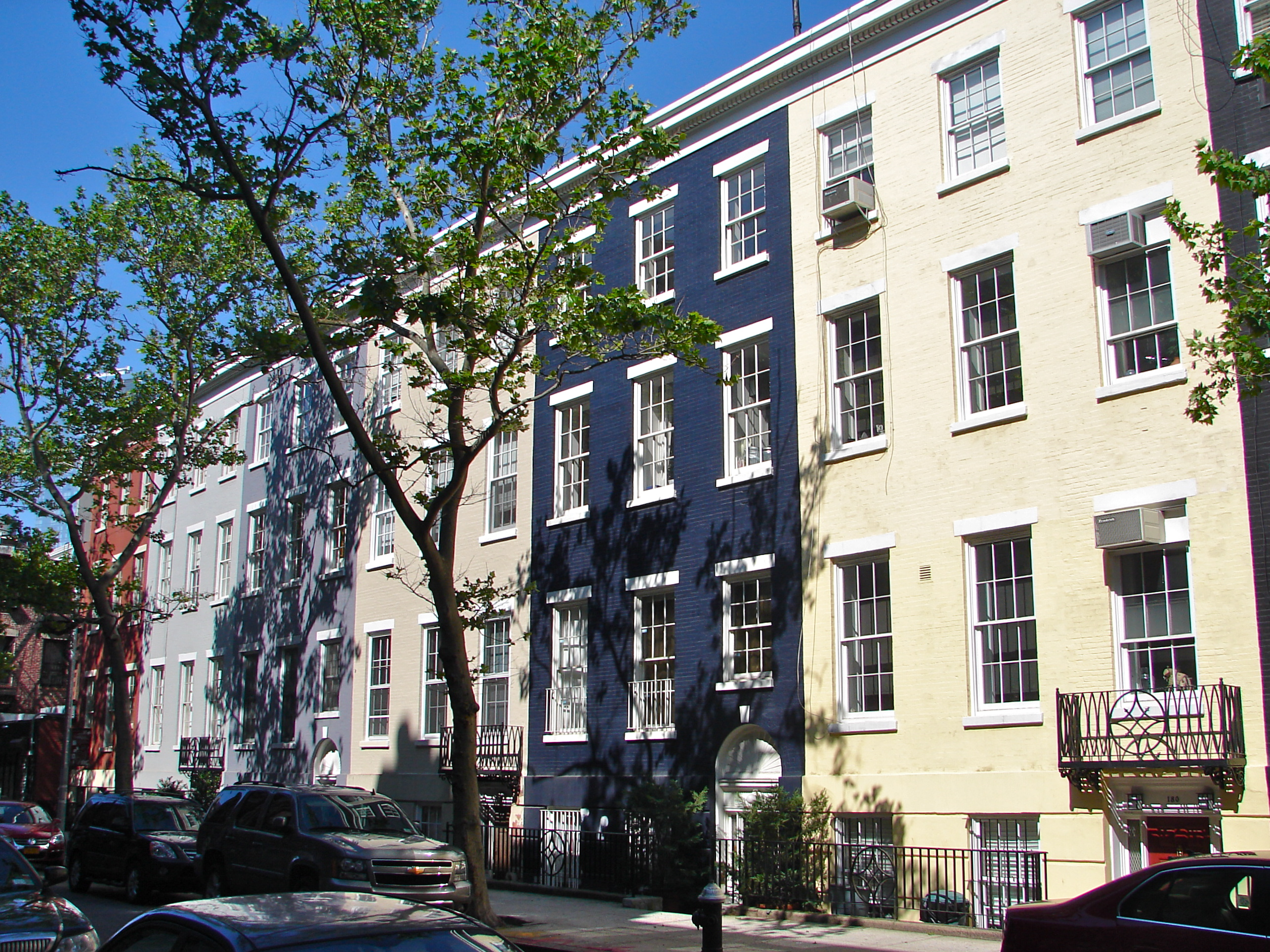
- Row Houses on Sullivan Street are part of the MacDougal–Sullivan Gardens Historic District
- Former name: Varick Place
- Location: Greenwich Village, South Village and SoHo, Manhattan, New York City
- Postal code: 10012, 10013
- Coordinates: 40.727°N 74.002°W
- North end: Washington Square South
- South end: Canal Street/Sixth Avenue/Watts Street at Duarte Square
- East: Thompson Street
- West: Macdougal Street

Sullivan Street is a street in Lower Manhattan, which previously ran north from Duarte Square at Canal Street, but since around 2012 begins at Broome Street, to Washington Square South, through the neighborhoods of Hudson Square, SoHo, the South Village and Greenwich Village. It runs parallel to and between Macdougal Street (to the west) and Thompson Street (to the east). Part of the street is in the MacDougal–Sullivan Gardens Historic District. The street was named for Revolutionary War Major General John Sullivan in 1799; before then, it was known as Locust Street.

Notable places include 83 and 85 Sullivan Street; 116 Sullivan Street; Vesuvio Playground at Spring Street, a neighborhood park, formerly named Thompson Street Playground; and St. Anthony of Padua Church at 155 Sullivan Street, near the corner of Houston Street.

Notable residents include Genovese crime family boss Vincent Gigante; artist and satirist Joey Skaggs at 135 Sullivan Street, politician Fiorello La Guardia, three-term Mayor of New York City, who was born at 177 Sullivan Street; Vogue editrix Anna Wintour lived on Sullivan Street; composer Edgard Varèse and his wife Louise lived at 188 Sullivan.
