= Thompson Street (Manhattan) =

Street in Manhattan, New York

- Location: Greenwich Village and SoHo, Manhattan, New York City
- Postal code: 10012, 10013
- North end: Washington Square South
- South end: Avenue of the Americas
- East: LaGuardia Place
- West: Sullivan Street

Thompson Street is a street in the Lower Manhattan neighborhoods of Greenwich Village and SoHo in New York City, which runs north–south, from Washington Square Park at Washington Square South (West Fourth Street) to the Avenue of the Americas (Sixth Avenue) below Grand Street, where the street turns right to Sixth Avenue; it thus does not connect with Canal Street just a half block south of the turning point. It runs parallel to and between Sullivan Street (to the west), and LaGuardia Place (formerly Laurens Street) which becomes West Broadway (to the east). Vehicular traffic goes southbound.

The street was named for Revolutionary War Brigadier General William Thompson, who served in New York and Canada.

== Notable places ==
- Carbone, at 181 Thompson Street; an Italian restaurant.
- Vesuvio Playground, on the corner of Thompson Street and Spring Street; a neighborhood park, formerly named Thompson Street Playground.
- The Uncommons, at 230 Thompson Street, formerly the Village Chess Shop, now Manhattan's first and only board game cafe.

== Notable residents ==
- Abraham David Christian, at 59 #27 Thompson Street, sculptor.
- Thomas Eboli, at 177 Thompson Street, mobster who was acting boss of the Genovese crime family.
- Carmine Galante, at 206 Thompson Street, mobster and acting boss of the Bonanno crime family.
- Vincent Gigante, at 181 and 238 Thompson Street, Italian-American mobster who was boss of the Genovese crime family.
- Bernhard Goetz, at 211 Thompson Street, the Subway Shooter.
- Anthony Strollo, 177 Thompson Street, mobster who served as a high-ranking capo of the Genovese crime family.
- Frank Zappa, at 180 Thompson Street, composer, singer-songwriter, guitarist, recording engineer, music producer and film director.
- Tom Shaner, at 222-224 Thompson Street, singer-songwriter, guitarist, recording engineer, music producer and video director.

== Gallery ==
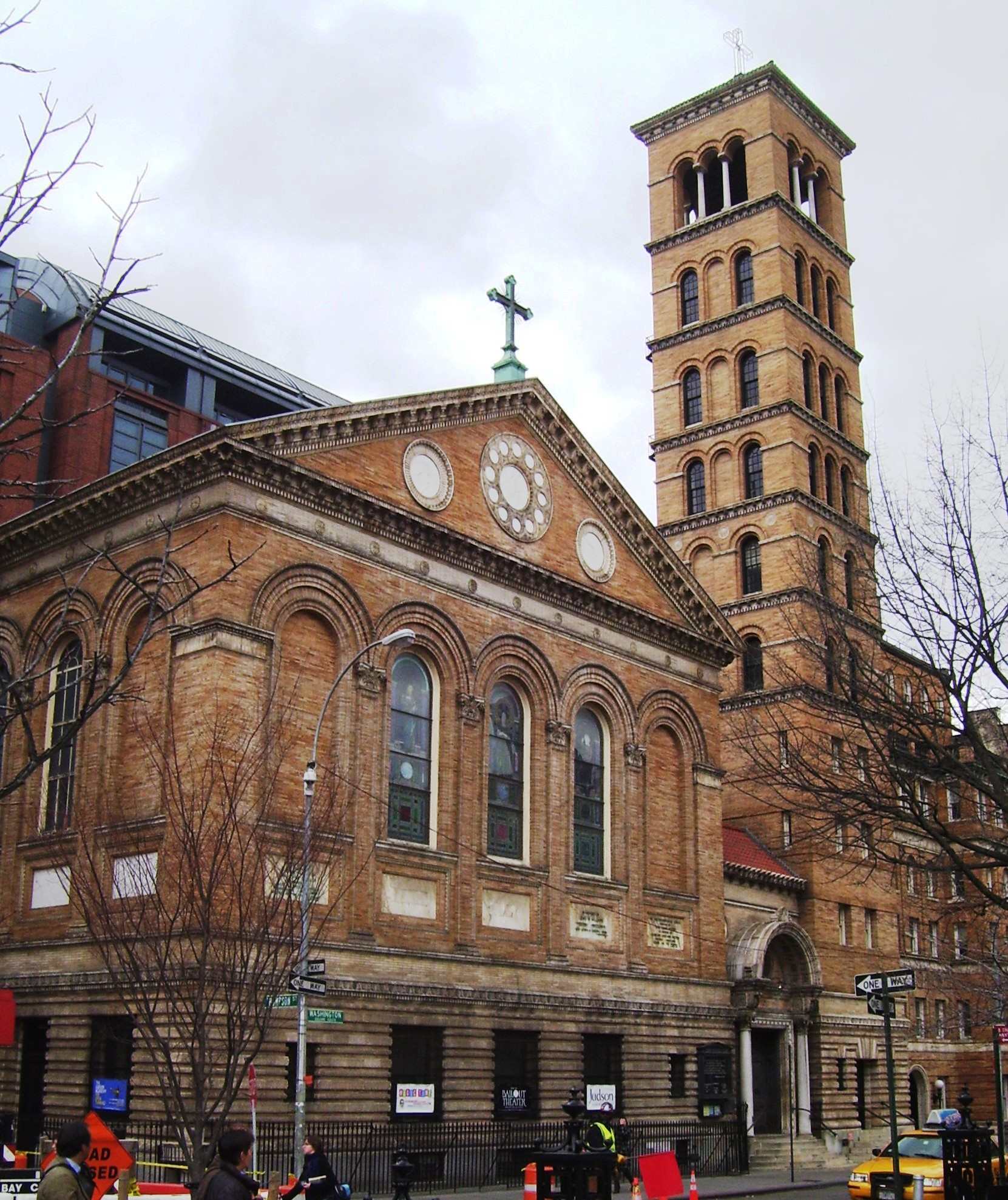
The Judson Memorial Church on the corner of Thompson Street and Washington Square South

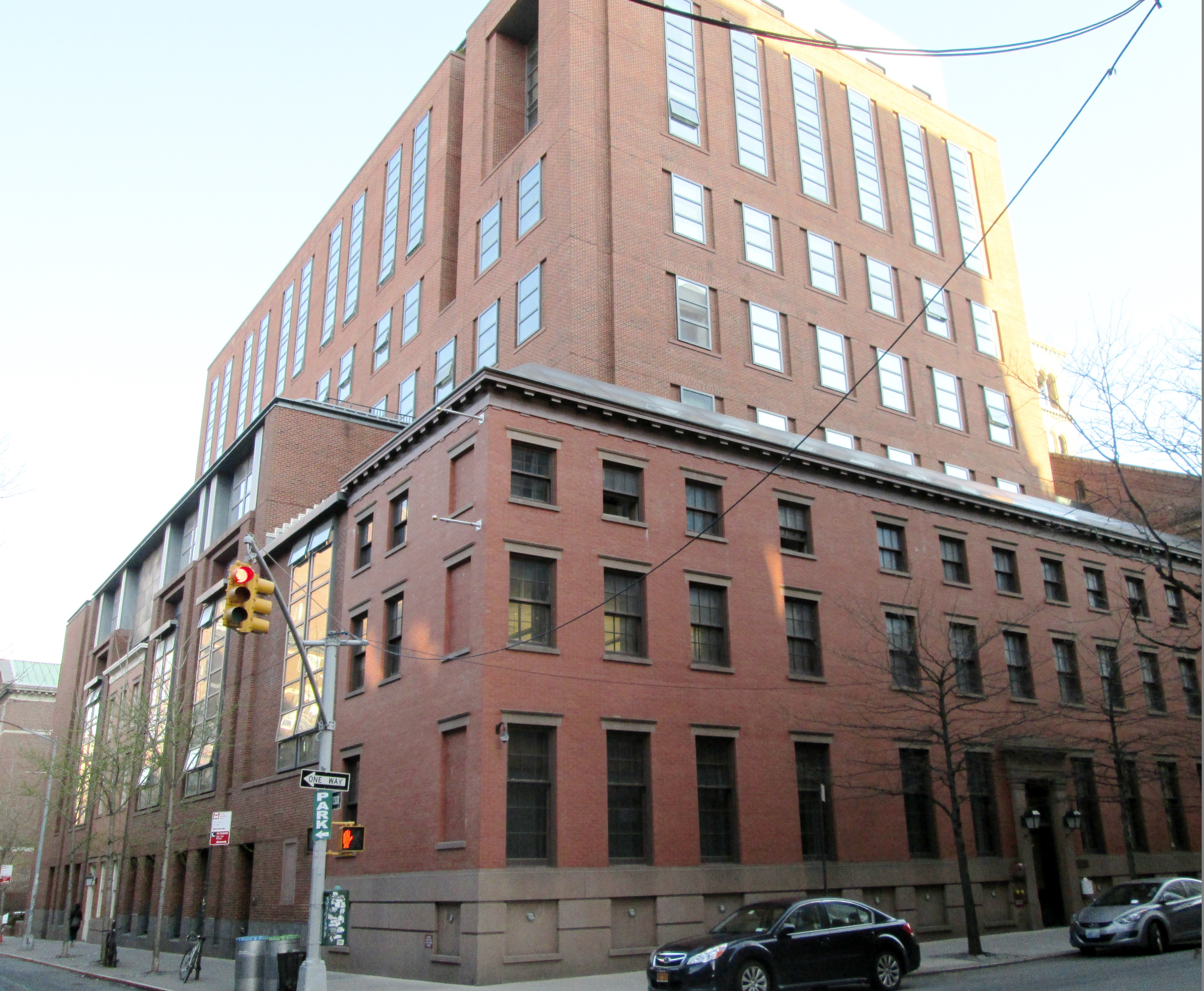
Furman Hall of New York University Law School, at Thompson and West 3rd Streets

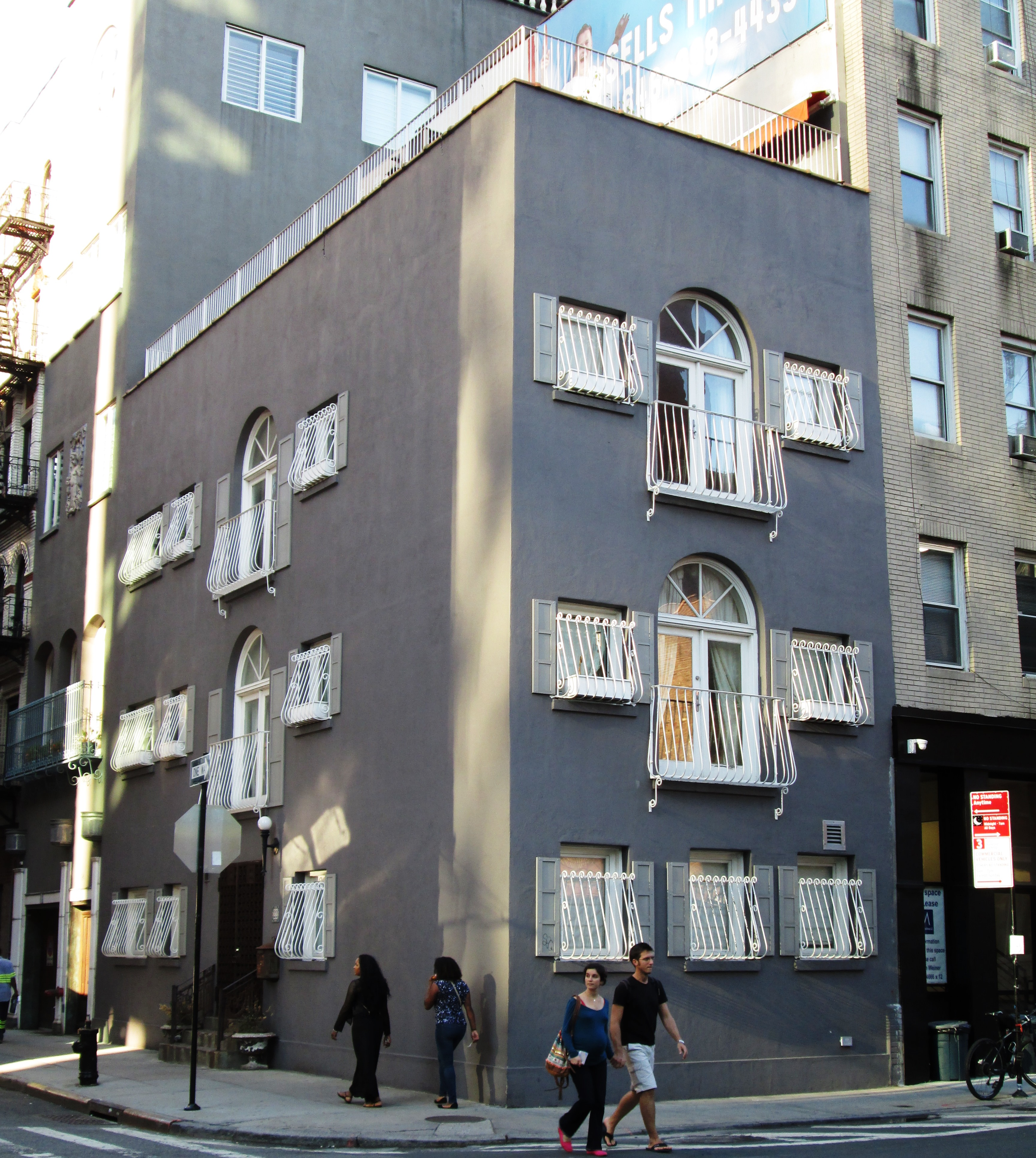
22 Thomson Street at the corner of Grand Street was built c.1900
