= 116 Sullivan Street =

Building in Manhattan, New York

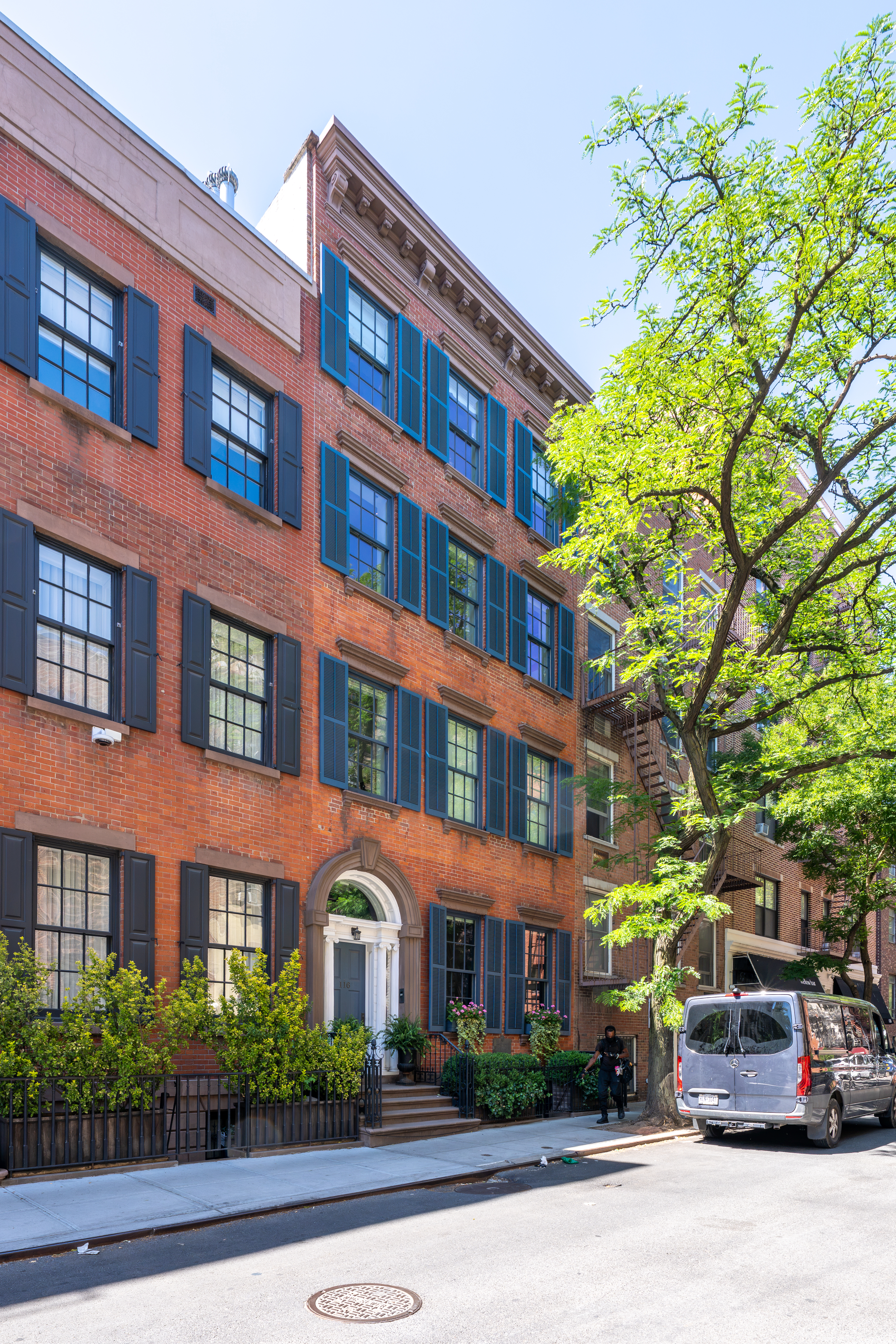

- Location within New York City
- 40°43′33.9″N 74°0′10.3″W
- Location: Manhattan, New York

History
- Built: 1832, heightened two stories in 1872

Site notes
- Architectural style: Federal

New York City Landmark
- Designated: May 15, 1973
- Reference no.: LP-0645

116 Sullivan Street is on Sullivan Street in SoHo, Manhattan, New York. The red four-story brick Federal townhouse was built in 1832 as an investment by Charles Starr (bookbinder) and includes some Greek Revival details. It was heightened two stories in 1872. The structure is noteworthy for its elaborated round-arched brownstone doorcase, or "enframement of the front door," which has an exceptional treatment of painted timber Ionic half-column sidelights, unique and highly significant in New York City architecture. Due to the sidelights, "instead of leaded glass, typical of the time, each sidelight is divided into three superimposed oval sections. The ovals are formed by a richly carved wood enframement that simulates a cloth sash curtain drawn through a series of rings."

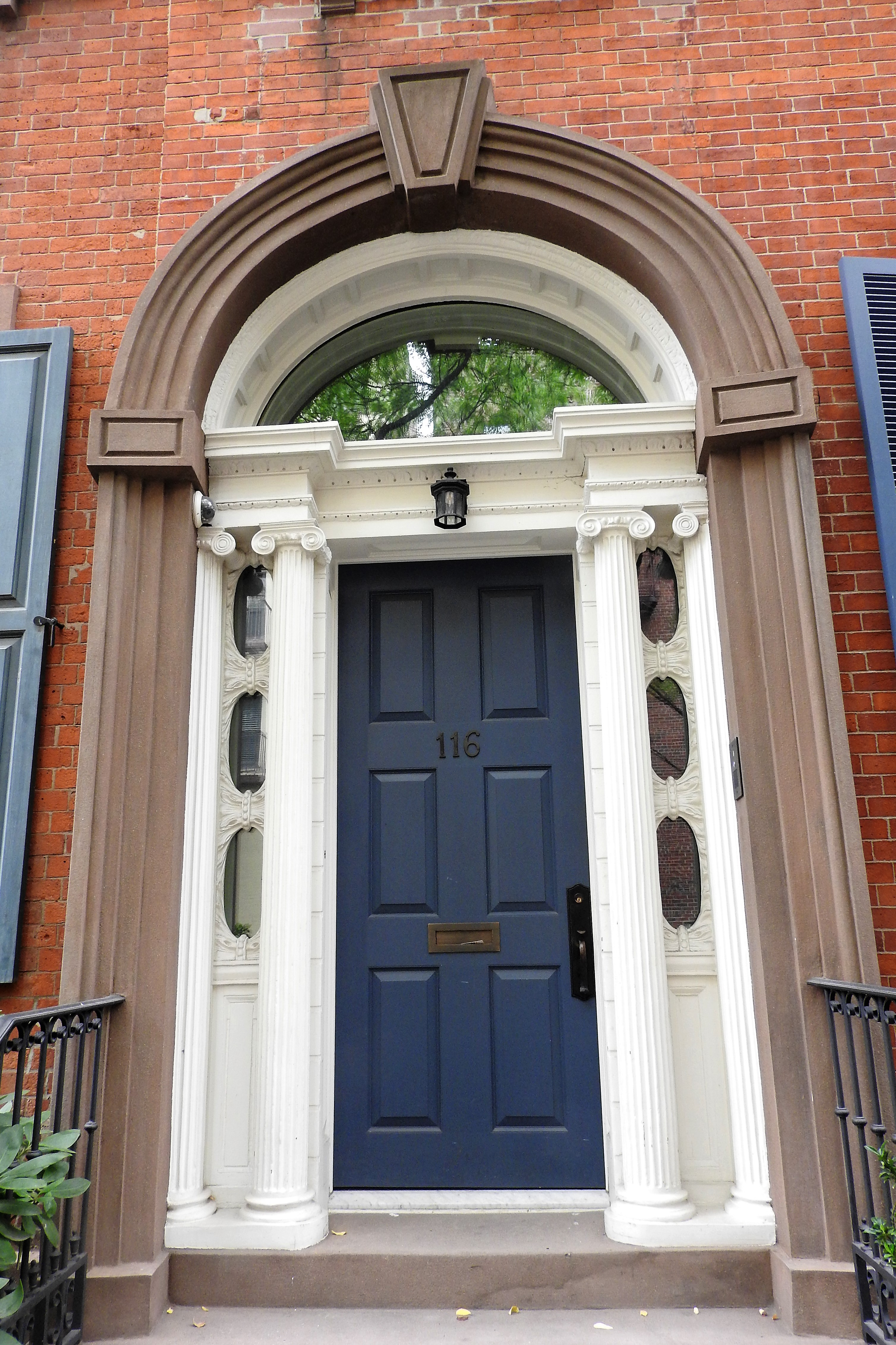
The door

The house stands on land previously belonging to the farm of Nicholas Bayard, Peter Stuyvesant's brother-in-law, and is one of seven houses that was built as an investment by Charles Starr, a bookbinder, whose business was on Nassau Street. Starr's own house at 110 Sullivan Street was 32 feet wide, unusually large for the time. It has been restored.

== See also ==
- National Register of Historic Places listings in Manhattan below 14th Street
- List of New York City Designated Landmarks in Manhattan below 14th Street
