= John Sullivan (general) =

Continental Army officer, politician and judge (1740–1795)

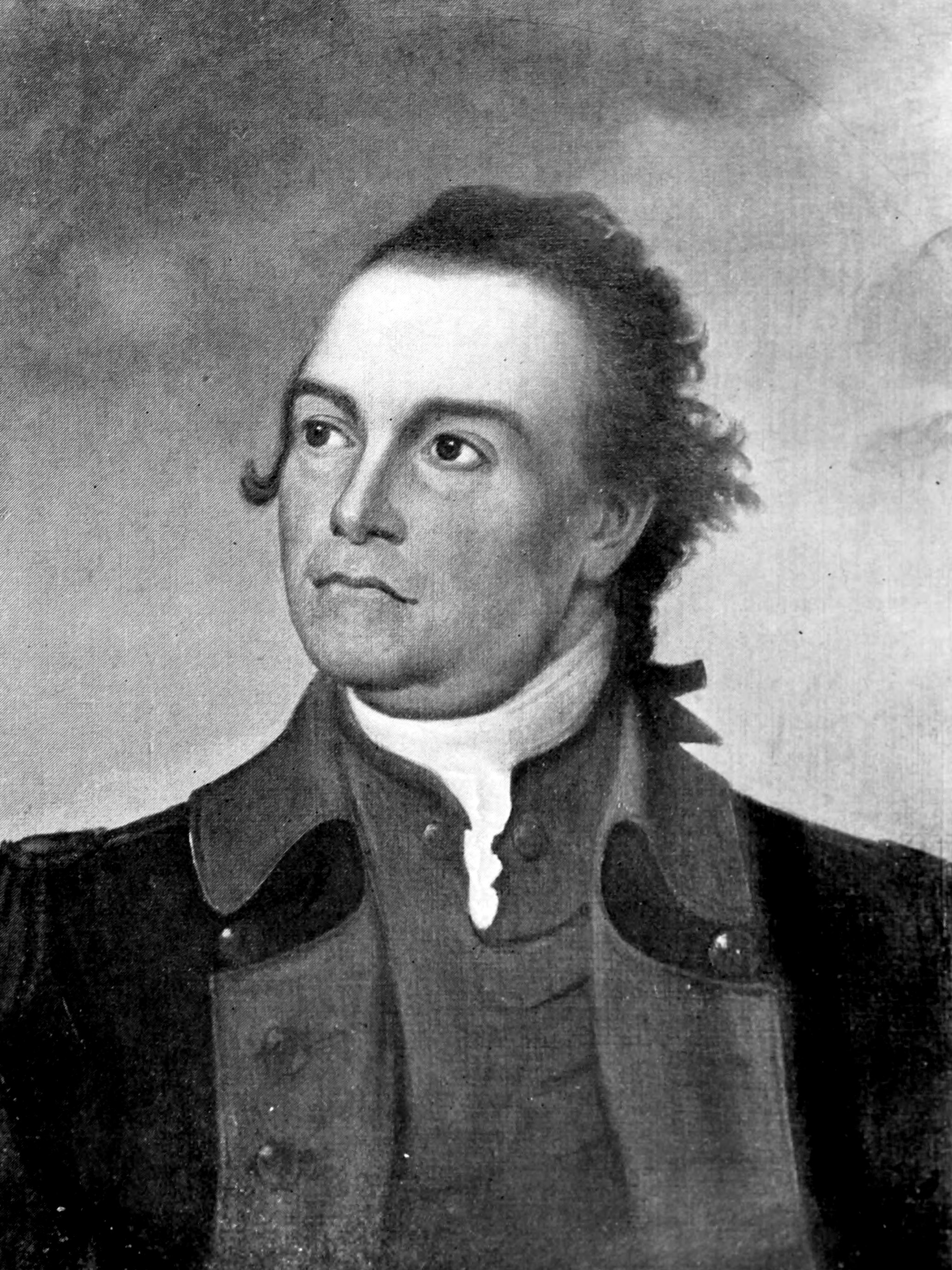
- 1873 portrait

Judge of the United States District Court for the District of New Hampshire
- In office September 26, 1789 – January 23, 1795
- Appointed by: George Washington
- Preceded by: Seat established by 1 Stat. 73
- Succeeded by: John Pickering

3rd Governor of New Hampshire
- In office January 22, 1789 – June 5, 1790
- Preceded by: John Langdon
- Succeeded by: Josiah Bartlett
- In office June 7, 1786 – June 4, 1788
- Preceded by: John Langdon
- Succeeded by: John Langdon

Personal details
- Born: John Sullivan; February 17, 1740 Somersworth, Province of New Hampshire, British America
- Died: January 23, 1795 (aged 54) Durham, New Hampshire, U.S.
- Resting place: Durham, New Hampshire, U.S.
- Party: Federalist
- Children: George Sullivan
- Relatives: James Sullivan
- Education: read law

Military service
- Allegiance: United States
- Branch/service: Continental Army
- Years of service: 1775-1779
- Rank: Major general
- Battles/wars: American Revolutionary War; Siege of Boston; Invasion of Quebec; Battle of Long Island (POW); Battle of Trenton; Battle of Princeton; Battle of Staten Island; Battle of Germantown; Battle of Brandywine; Battle of Rhode Island; Sullivan Expedition

Major General John Sullivan (February 17, 1740 – January 23, 1795) was a Continental Army officer, politician and judge who served in the American Revolutionary War and participated in several key events of the conflict, most notably George Washington's crossing of the Delaware River. He was also a delegate to the Continental Congress, where Sullivan signed the Continental Association. After the war, he served as the third governor of New Hampshire and was appointed as a United States district judge of the District Court for the District of New Hampshire.

Sullivan, the third son of Irish settlers, led the Sullivan Expedition in 1779, a scorched earth campaign by the Continental Army which destroyed 40 Haudenosaunee (Iroquois) villages, killed 200 Haudenosaunee and forcibly displaced 5,000 Haudenosaunee as refugees to British-controlled Fort Niagara. There is a historiographical debate over whether or not the actions of Sullivan and his troops during the expedition constitute genocide. As a member of Congress, Sullivan worked closely with the French ambassador to the United States, the Chevalier de la Luzerne.

== Early life and family ==
Born in Somersworth in the Province of New Hampshire, British America, Sullivan was the third son of Irish settlers from the Beara Peninsula in County Cork, Ireland. His father was a schoolmaster. One of his brothers, James Sullivan, became governor of Massachusetts. Another brother, Benjamin, served in the Royal Navy and died before the American Revolution. A landing party from HMS Allegiance captured another brother, Captain Daniel Sullivan, on February 14, 1781, at his home at Waukeag Point in Maine (later Sullivan and Sorrento) with Daniel later dying of disease aboard the Jersey Prison Ship in 1783.

The father, John Owen ("Eoghan") O'Sullivan was the son of Philip O'Sullivan of Beare of Ardea, Tuosist, minor gentry in penal Ireland and a scion of the O'Sullivan Beare Clan, Ardea Castle line. The Penal Laws reduced them (as Catholics) to the legal status of peasants, although they retained their wealth and social standing. After emigrating to York in the area the Province of Massachusetts Bay that would eventually become the State of Maine, in 1723, the elder John became a Protestant.

In 1760, Sullivan married Lydia Remick Worster of Kittery, now in Maine. John and Lydia Sullivan had six children, Margery, who died in infancy, Lydia, John, James, George (who served as a United States representative from New Hampshire) and another Margery, who lived only two years.

== Career ==
Sullivan read law with Samuel Livermore of Portsmouth, New Hampshire, between 1758 and 1760. He began the practice of law in 1763 at Berwick, now in Maine, and continued in the practice when he moved to Durham, New Hampshire, in 1764. He annoyed many neighbors in his early career, when he was the only lawyer in town, with numerous suits over foreclosures and was threatened with violence at least twice in 1766. But by 1772, he was firmly established and began work to improve his relations with the community. He also expanded his interests into milling from which he made a substantial income. In 1773, Alexander Scammell joined Sullivan's law practice.

Sullivan built a friendship with the royal governor of New Hampshire, John Wentworth, who had assumed the office in 1767. In November 1772, Wentworth appointed Sullivan a major in the militia. As the American Revolution grew nearer, Sullivan turned away from Wentworth and began to side more with the Patriots. On May 28, 1773, at the urging of the Virginia House of Burgesses, the New Hampshire Assembly established a committee of correspondence. Hoping to thwart the committee, Wentworth adjourned the Assembly the next day.

On December 16, 1773, colonists in Massachusetts destroyed tea worth 15,000 pounds at the Boston Tea Party to protest taxes under the Tea Act. The British Parliament responded with the Boston Port Act, effective March 21, 1774, which closed the Port of Boston until restitution for the destroyed tea was made to the East India Company. Parliament went on to pass the Massachusetts Government Act, which removed many functions of government from local control, the Quartering Act, which permitted quartering of troops in towns where there was disorder, and the Quebec Act, which established the Catholic religion and French civil law in that province.

Wentworth called a new Assembly, which began meeting on April 7, 1774. On May 13, news of the Boston Port Act reached the Assembly. On May 27, the Assembly provided for only five men and an officer to guard Fort William and Mary at Portsmouth harbor. A new committee of correspondence was selected the next day. By the time Wentworth dissolved the Assembly on June 8, in an unsuccessful effort to prevent the Assembly from sending delegates to a Continental Congress, Sullivan was firmly in favor of supporting the Massachusetts Patriots.

== Political and military actions (1774–1775) ==
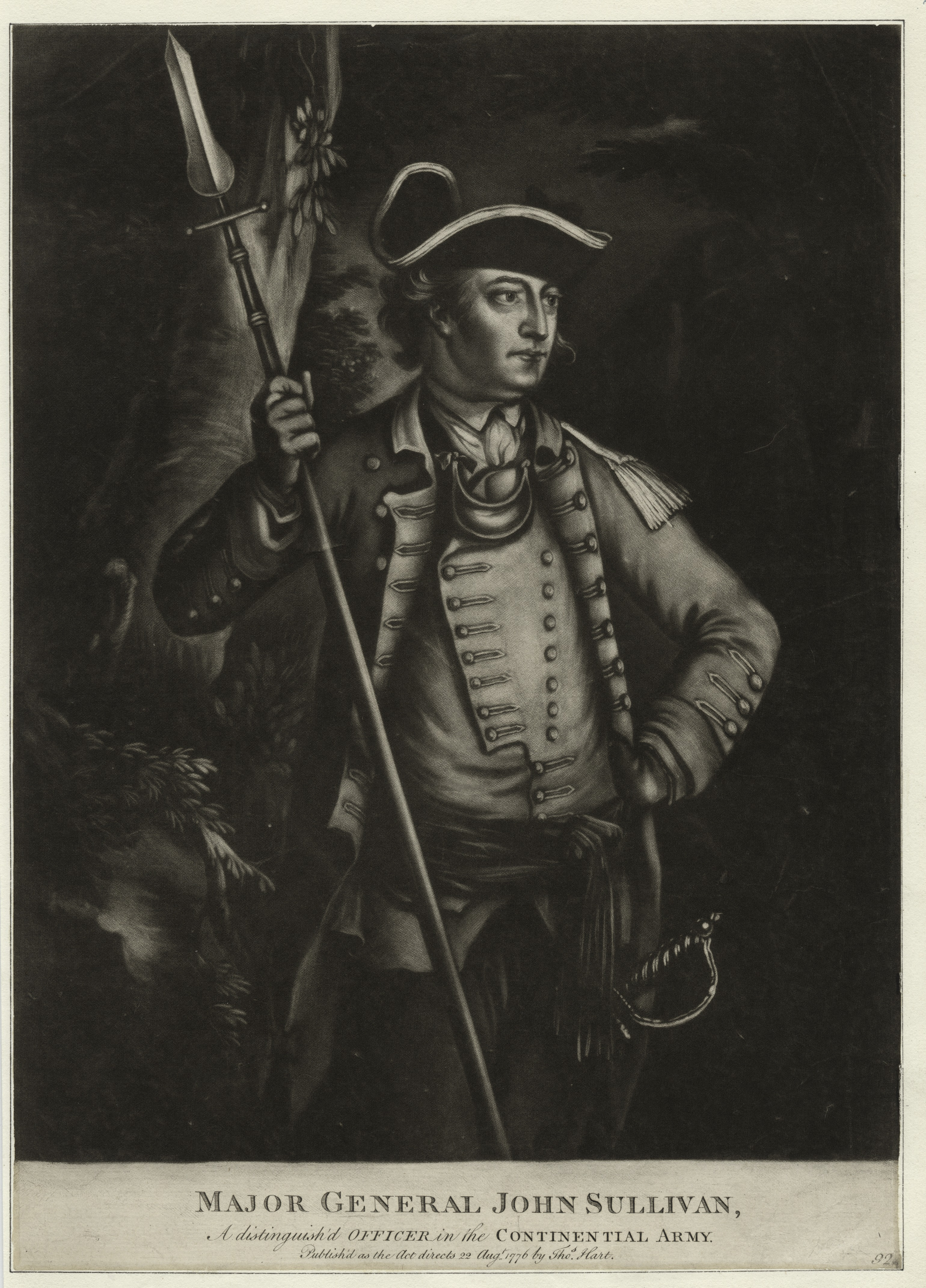
Major General John Sullivan, a distinguished officer in the Continental Army.

In response to Wentworth's action dismissing the Assembly and the call for a Continental Congress to support Boston after the British sanctions against it, on July 21, 1774, the first Provincial Congress of New Hampshire met at Exeter, with Sullivan as Durham's delegate. The assembly sent him and Nathaniel Folsom as delegates to the First Continental Congress. The assembly adopted a Declaration of Rights and Grievances on October 14, 1774. By November 8, Sullivan and Folsom were back in New Hampshire to work for acceptance of the Declaration and the Association of the colonies to support economic measures to achieve their objectives.

On October 19, 1774, a royal order in council prohibited the export of powder and arms to America, and Lord Dartmouth secretly wrote to the colonial governors to secure gunpowder, arms and ammunition in the provinces. After Paul Revere was sent by the Massachusetts committee to warn the Portsmouth militia of a rumored British movement toward Fort William and Mary, the militia raided the fort and seized gunpowder on December 14. Sullivan led another militia force on a second raid on December 15, taking 16 cannon, about 60 muskets and other stores. They were prevented from returning for other cannon and supplies by the arrival of the man-of-war Canceaux, followed two days later by the frigate Scarborough. Wentworth refrained from seeking to arrest Sullivan and others because he thought he had little popular support and the militia would not act.

In January 1775, a second Provincial Congress at Exeter voted to send Sullivan and John Langdon to the Second Continental Congress. Sullivan, supported by Folsom and Langdon, persuaded the assembly to petition Wentworth to call a New Hampshire Assembly that he would not dissolve. Wentworth responded by dismissing Sullivan from the militia and further postponing the meeting of the assembly. Since Wentworth believed he had little power to arrest Sullivan and other leaders of the extra–legal assembly, Sullivan and Langdon started traveling to Philadelphia. Upon arrival in Philadelphia, Sullivan joined those who argued that war had been started by the actions at the Battles of Lexington and Concord and that the colonies should proceed with it.

Congress soon decided that it must take charge of the army forming around Boston. It appointed George Washington as commander in chief and several other generals, including Sullivan as a brigadier general. On June 27, 1775, Sullivan left Philadelphia to join the army at the siege of Boston.

== Revolutionary War ==
After the British evacuated Boston in the spring of 1776, Washington sent Brigadier General Sullivan north to replace the fallen John Thomas as commander in Quebec. He took command of the sick and faltering invasion force, sent some of those forces on an unsuccessful counterattack against the British at Trois-Rivières, and withdrew the survivors to Crown Point. This led to the first of several controversies between Congress and Sullivan, as they sought a scapegoat for the failed invasion of northeastern Canada. He was exonerated and promoted to major general on August 9, 1776.

=== Long Island ===
Sullivan rejoined Washington and was placed in command of the troops on Long Island to defend against British General Howe's forces about to envelop New York City. But then, on August 23, Washington split the command between Sullivan and General Israel Putnam, with Putnam being the senior general. Confusion about the distribution of command contributed to the American defeat at the Battle of Long Island four days later. Sullivan's personal bravery was unquestioned, as he engaged the Hessian attackers at Battle Pass with a pistol in each hand; however, he was captured.

General Howe and his brother, Admiral Richard Howe, managed to convince Sullivan that a conference with members of the Continental Congress might lead to peace, and released him on parole to deliver a message to the Congress in Philadelphia, proposing an informal meeting to discuss ending the armed conflict between Britain and its rebellious colonies. After Sullivan's speech to Congress, John Adams cynically commented on this diplomatic attempt, calling Sullivan a "decoy-duck" and accusing the British of sending Sullivan "to seduce us into a renunciation of our independence"; others noted that it appeared to be an attempt to blame Congress for prolonging the war. Congress did agree to a peace conference with the British, which led to no new progress.

=== New Jersey and Pennsylvania ===
General Sullivan was released in a prisoner exchange (for captured British officer Richard Prescott) in time to rejoin Washington before the Battle of Trenton. There his division secured the important bridge over the Assunpink Creek to the south of the town. This prevented escape and ensured the high number of Hessian prisoners captured. In January 1777, Sullivan also performed well in the Battle of Princeton.

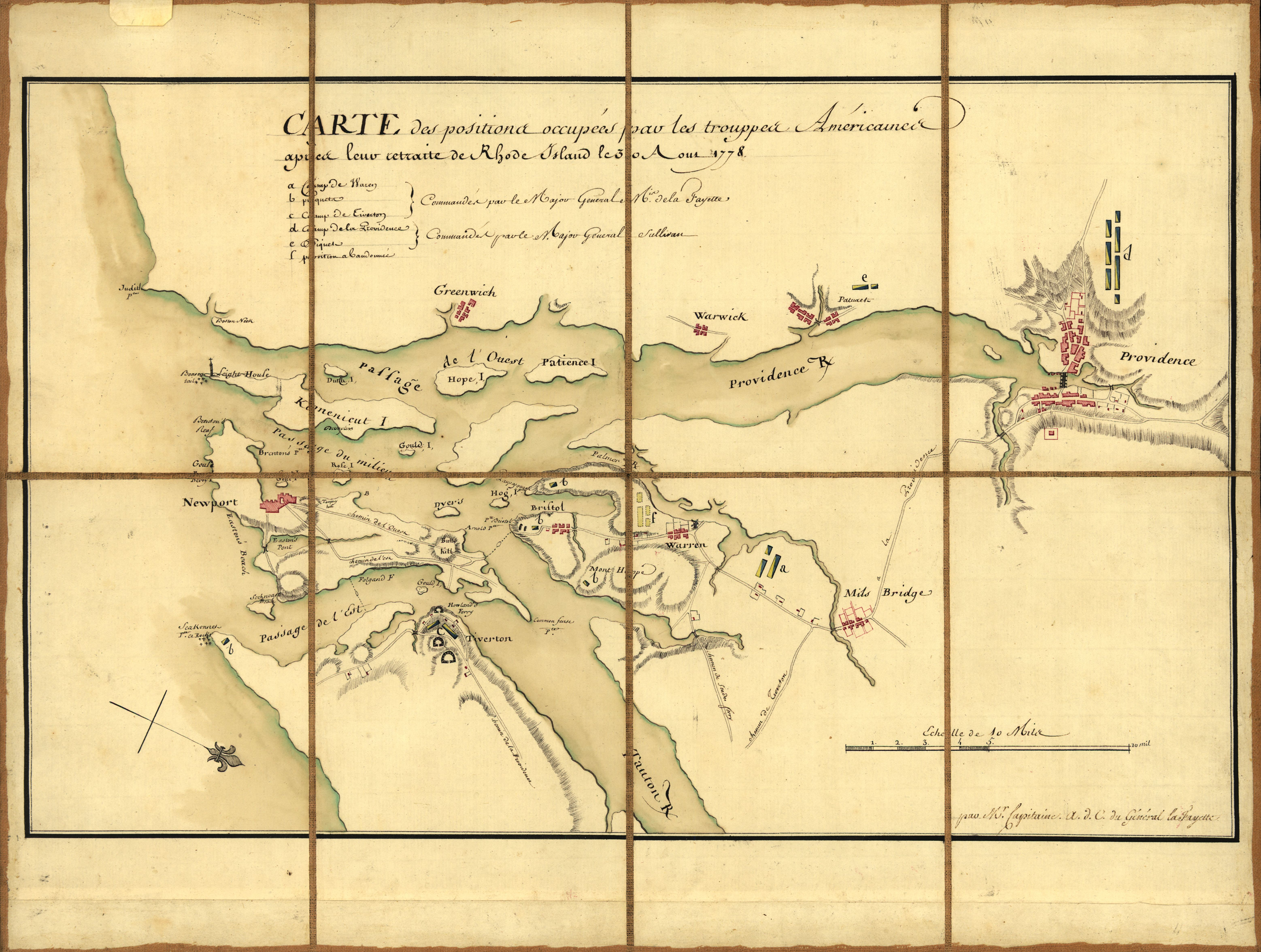
A 1778 French military map showing the positions of generals Lafayette and Sullivan around Newport Bay on August 30 during the Rhode Island campaign.

In August, he spoke out against the neutrality of Quakers in the American Revolution and led a raid on Staten Island. Again Congress found fault, but he was exonerated by the court of inquiry. This was followed by American losses at Brandywine and Germantown. During the Battle of Brandywine in September 1777, he and his troops were bivouacked at Brinton's Ford adjacent to Brinton's Mill. Sullivan's men were attacked and sent into retreat by a surprise flanking attack at Brandywine but were eventually able to leave the field in good order when they were reinforced by troops under the command of General Nathanael Greene. In the initial attack at Germantown, Sullivan's men routed British light infantry. Heavy fog caused wrong turns and delayed troop movements ruined Washington's plan, and Sullivan's troops took on friendly fire.

=== Rhode Island ===
In early 1778, Sullivan was transferred to the post of Rhode Island where he led Continental troops and militia. It was intended he work together with a French Navy fleet to assault or besiege British-held Newport. The attempt was called off when the French fleet of Admiral d'Estaing was scattered and damaged by a storm. Owing to the damage to his ships and discouraged by the arrival of a British fleet under Lord Howe, D'Estaing withdrew to Boston. The British garrison of Newport then sortied, forcing Sullivan into retreat after fighting the inconclusive Battle of Rhode Island in August 1778. Sullivan wrote a letter to D'Estaing protesting what he saw as treachery and cowardice and describing it as "derogatory to the honor of France".

=== Sullivan Expedition ===
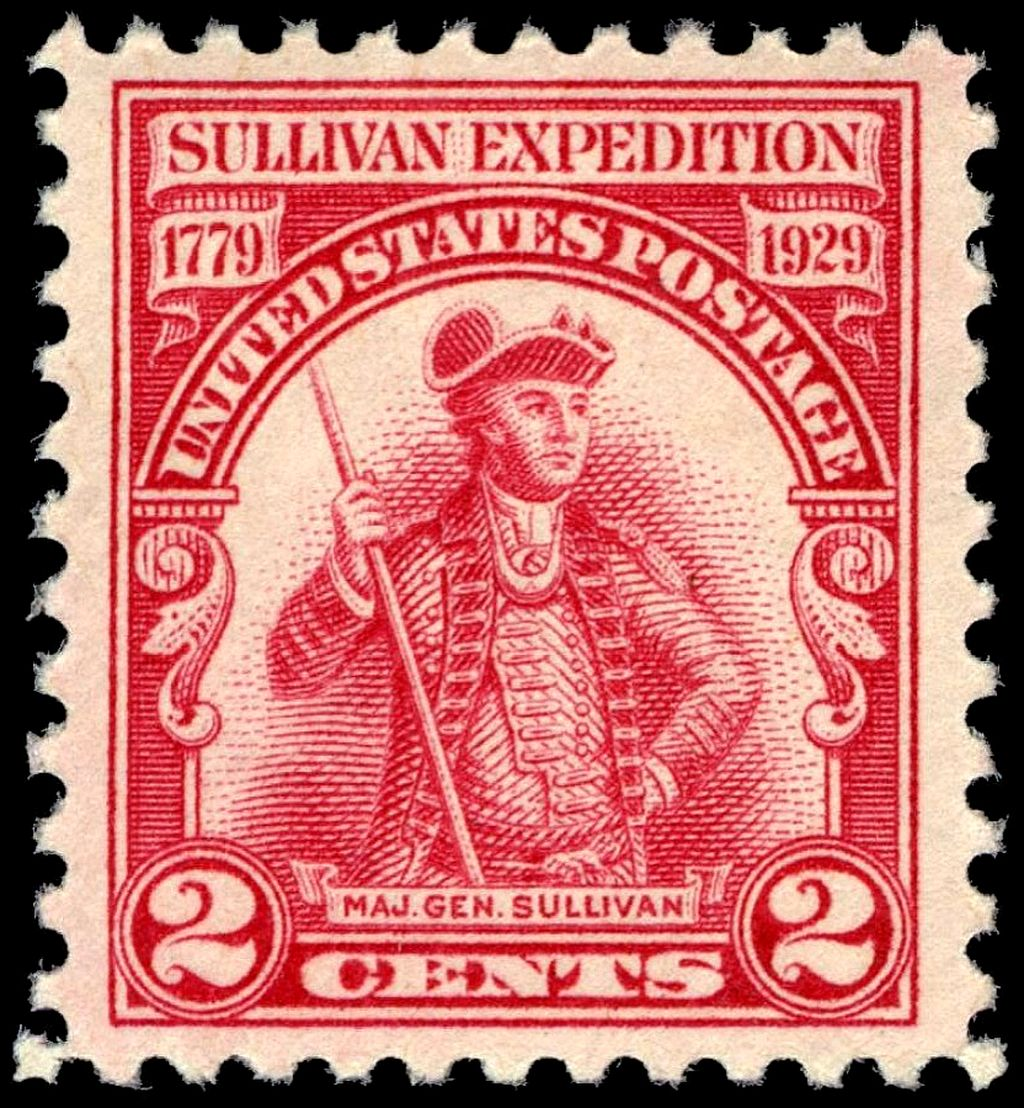
1929 postage stamp issued by the U.S. Post Office to commemorate the 150th anniversary of the Sullivan Expedition

In the summer of 1779, Sullivan led a scorched earth campaign in Western New York against the Haudenosaunee, who were allied to the British. Washington ordered the campaign, which came to be known as the Sullivan Expedition, in response to several American defeats at Haudenosaunee hands, such as the Battle of Wyoming and Cherry Valley massacre. Sullivan and his troops destroyed 40 Haudenosaunee villages and numerous crop fields, forcibly displacing 5,000 Haudenosaunee to British-controlled Fort Niagara. 200 Haudenosaunee were killed by American troops, including several women and children. During the harsh winter of 1779–1780, several hundred more Haudenosaunee died from starvation or disease at Fort Niagara.

During the expedition, Sullivan pushed his troops so hard that many of their horses weakened and died, creating the namesake for the town of Horseheads, New York. The conduct of American troops during the expedition has been described as genocidal by several scholars, though other describe it as ethnic cleansing and some reject the label of genocide entirely. Sullivan returned from the expedition to a lukewarm response from Congress, which was more than he could accept. Disappointed by Congress' estimation of his expedition, Sullivan resigned from the Continental Army in 1779 and returned to New Hampshire.

== Congress ==
At home Sullivan was seen as a hero. The New Hampshire legislature selected him as a delegate to the Continental Congress for one year to start in November 1780, against his wishes. Although most of the delegates to Congress were new, Sullivan still had opponents there. Nonetheless, he accepted the position in order that New Hampshire be represented in the controversy concerning claims to Vermont under the New Hampshire Grants. In the absence of other delegates from New Hampshire except the soon to depart Nathaniel Folsom, Sullivan was seated early, on September 11, 1780. Immediately, Sullivan and Folsom had to deal with the question of whether Vermont would be part of New York or New Hampshire or would be independent. Ultimately, since possible negotiation of Vermont with the British to become a part of Canada was threatened, on August 3, 1781, Sullivan seconded appointment of a committee to negotiate with Vermont on becoming a separate state.

Congress also had to deal with a financial crisis since the treasury was empty and the Confederation's credit was poor. Sullivan served on a committee to deal with this problem. In late 1780 or early 1781, Sullivan, who often claimed to be in financial straits, borrowed money from the French minister to Congress, probably with no intent or expectation of repayment. Sullivan already supported positions favorable to the French in Congress, but historian Charles Whittemore describes Sullivan's conduct as "ethically obtuse" and as tarnishing his reputation. Yet, Sullivan worked to help the country and government on several matters such as seeking French financial support for the United States.

Later in the year, Sullivan worked to get people appointed as peace negotiators, especially Benjamin Franklin, who were favored by the French because they might not insist on western land claims and thereby help shorten the war by eliminating that issue. Of course, Sullivan alone could not have attained results on such matters without majority support. One of Sullivan's last acts was to vote for Robert Livingston for appointment to the position of United States Secretary of Foreign Affairs. Having been seated early, and having dealt with the matters he believed he was required to deal with, Sullivan resigned from the Congress and departed from Philadelphia on August 11, 1781, a month before the expiration of a one-year term from the date he was seated.

== Later career ==
Returning home to New Hampshire, Sullivan was named the state's attorney general in 1782 and served until 1786. During this same time he was elected to the state assembly and served as speaker of the House. He led the drive in New Hampshire that led to ratification of the United States Constitution on June 21, 1788. He was elected president of New Hampshire (now governor) in 1786, 1787 and 1789. During his first term as governor, he put down the Exeter Rebellion. He was also a candidate for the United States House of Representatives in 1788.

Sullivan was nominated by President Washington on September 24, 1789, to the United States District Court for the District of New Hampshire, to a new seat authorized by 1 Stat. 73. He was confirmed by the United States Senate on September 26, 1789, and received his commission the same day. His ill health delayed his assumption of the post until after 1792.

== Death and legacy ==
New Hampshire historical marker for Sullivan in Durham

Sullivan died in his home in Durham on January 23, 1795. He was interred in the family cemetery in Durham. Sullivan was first Grand Master of the Grand Lodge of New Hampshire and had been a member of St. John's Lodge, in Portsmouth since 1767. Following the conclusion of the Revolutionary War, Sullivan became one of the original 31 members of The Society of the Cincinnati in the state of New Hampshire on November 18, 1783. He was elected the first President of the New Hampshire Society and served in that capacity until 1793.

In New Hampshire, both a county and a town are named after him. The General Sullivan Bridge spanning Little Bay near his home town of Durham is named for him. He is featured on a New Hampshire historical marker (number 89) along New Hampshire Route 108 in Durham.

Counties in Missouri, New York, Pennsylvania, and Tennessee, as well as Sullivan, New York, are named for him, as is Sullivan Street in Greenwich Village, Manhattan. Sullivan's Bridge, a bicycle and pedestrian bridge crossing the Schuylkill River at Valley Forge National Historical Park, is named in his honor. Sullivan Trail is a road through northeast Pennsylvania that in many areas follows the road made by Sullivan's army in 1779. Part of the march route into Trenton is named Sullivan Way.

Bostonians still celebrate the evacuation of British forces each year on Evacuation Day, which coincides with Saint Patrick's Day. According to local legend, Sullivan used "Saint Patrick" as the official password the day he led Colonial troops into Boston.

== See also ==
- Israel Evans (chaplain) Chaplain who served under General Sullivan

== Sources ==
- Everest, Allan S. Moses Hazen and the Canadian Refugees in the American Revolution. Syracuse University Press, 1976.
- Fischer, David Hackett (2004). Washington's Crossing. New York: Oxford University Press US. ISBN 978-0195181593. OCLC 186017328.
- Golway, Terry. Washington's General: Nathanael Greene and the Triumph of the American Revolution. Owl Books, 2006.
- Gruber, Ira (1972). The Howe Brothers and the American Revolution. New York: Atheneum Press. OCLC 1464455.
- Trevelyan, Sir George Otto (1903). The American Revolution: 1766–1776. London & New York: Longmans, Green. p. 263. OCLC 8978164. "Trevelyan The American Revolution howe adams – princeton."
- Upton, Richard Francis (1936). Revolutionary New Hampshire: An Account of the Social and Political Forces Underlying the Transition from Royal Province to American Commonwealth. Dartmouth College Publications. OCLC 753114879. Archived from the original on October 7, 2017 – via Questia.
- Whittemore, Charles P. (1961). A General of the Revolution: John Sullivan of New Hampshire. Columbia University Press. OCLC 426098. Archived from the original on March 27, 2016 – via Questia.
- Journals of the military expedition of Major General John Sullivan against the Six nations of Indians in 1779. Auburn, N.Y., Knapp, Peck & Thomson, Printers. 1887.

Political offices
Preceded by John Langdon	Governor of New Hampshire; 1786–1788	Succeeded by John Langdon
Preceded by John Langdon	Governor of New Hampshire; 1789–1790	Succeeded by Josiah Bartlett
Legal offices
Preceded by Seat established by 1 Stat. 73	Judge of the United States District Court for the District of New Hampshire; 1789–1795	Succeeded by John Pickering
