= William Thompson (general) =

American Revolutionary War general

- Born: July 5, 1736; Ireland
- Died: September 3, 1781 (aged 45) Near Carlisle, Province of Pennsylvania, British America
- Allegiance: Great Britain; United Colonies
- Service years: 1756 (Great Britain); 1775-1776 (United Colonies)
- Conflicts: American Revolutionary War; Battle of Trois-Rivieres (POW)

William Thompson (July 5, 1736 – September 3, 1781) was a soldier from Pennsylvania who served as a colonel and later brigadier general in the Continental Army during the American Revolutionary War.

== Early life ==
Thompson was born in Ireland, on July 5, 1736, and later immigrated to Carlisle in the Province of Pennsylvania.

== Career ==
During the French and Indian War, Thompson served as a captain in the Kittanning Expedition under John Armstrong.

After news of the Battle of Bunker Hill reached Pennsylvania in 1775, Thompson was appointed colonel of a rifle battalion and was sent to Massachusetts to help in the defense of Boston. His unit was known as Thompson's Pennsylvania Rifle Battalion, or the 1st Pennsylvania Regiment. After Thompson's company of Pennsylvania sharpshooters drove back a British landing-party on November 9, 1775, he was made a brigadier-general, to the displeasure of George Washington, who had reservations about Thompson's abilities.

Sent to reinforce American troops in Quebec, Thompson was captured by British forces at Trois-Rivières in Quebec on June 8, 1776. He was paroled, but not exchanged for four years, and so he could not reenter military service. Thompson blamed Congressman Thomas McKean for hindering his exchange; his criticism became so harsh that he was censured by Congress. McKean successfully sued Thompson for libel.

While on parole in Philadelphia on December 17, 1778, he became an early Member of the Friendly Sons of St. Patrick.

== Personal life ==
Thompson married Catherine Ross, sister of George Ross, signer of the Declaration of Independence for Pennsylvania.

== Death ==
After finally being exchanged for Baron Riedesel, Thompson died on September 3, 1781, at his home near Carlisle, Pennsylvania.

== Legacy ==
Thompson Street in the Greenwich Village and SoHo neighborhoods of Manhattan in New York City was named after General Thompson, as well as – originally – the adjacent Vesuvio Playground.
