= Vesuvio Playground =

Public park in Manhattan, New York

- Thompson Street Playground (former name)
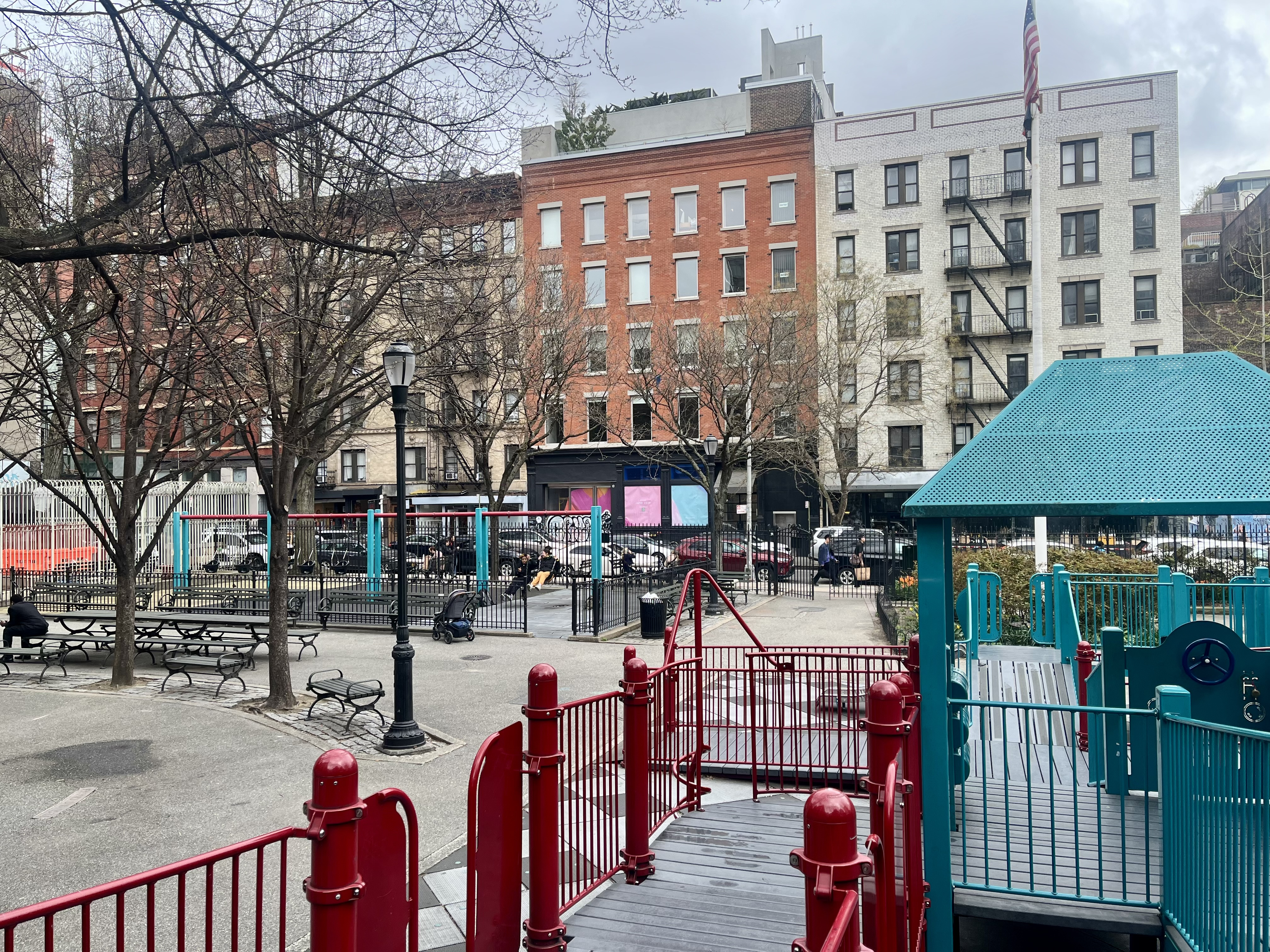
- Vesuvio Playground in 2024
- Interactive map of Vesuvio Playground
- Location: on the corner of Thompson Street and Spring Street off Prince Street in SoHo, Manhattan, New York City
- Coordinates: 40°43′30″N 74°00′09″W
- Area: 0.64-acre (2,600 m^{2})

Vesuvio Playground is an 0.64-acre (2,600 m^{2}) neighborhood park located on the corner of Thompson Street and Spring Street, off Prince Street, in SoHo, Manhattan, New York City.

It was named in the late 1990s after the nearby popular Vesuvio Bakery on nearby Prince Street, which was in turn named for the stratovolcano Mount Vesuvius. The volcano erupted in A.D. 79, destroying the Roman city of Pompeii. The park was named to honor the owner of the bakery; it could not be named after him because Parks Department policy prohibited the naming of the park after a living person. The playground was formerly named Thompson Street Playground, after the adjacent Thompson Street, which was in turn named after Revolutionary War Brigadier General William Thompson in the late 18th century.

The playground's land was purchased by the New York City Department of Parks and Recreation in pieces, in 1929, 1930, and 1957. The park has basketball courts, handball courts, bocce courts, a three-foot mini-pool, playgrounds, sandboxes, water fountains, spray showers, and public bathrooms. A $2.9 million renovation of the park was completed in 2007.
