= Dunbarton, New Hampshire =

- Town
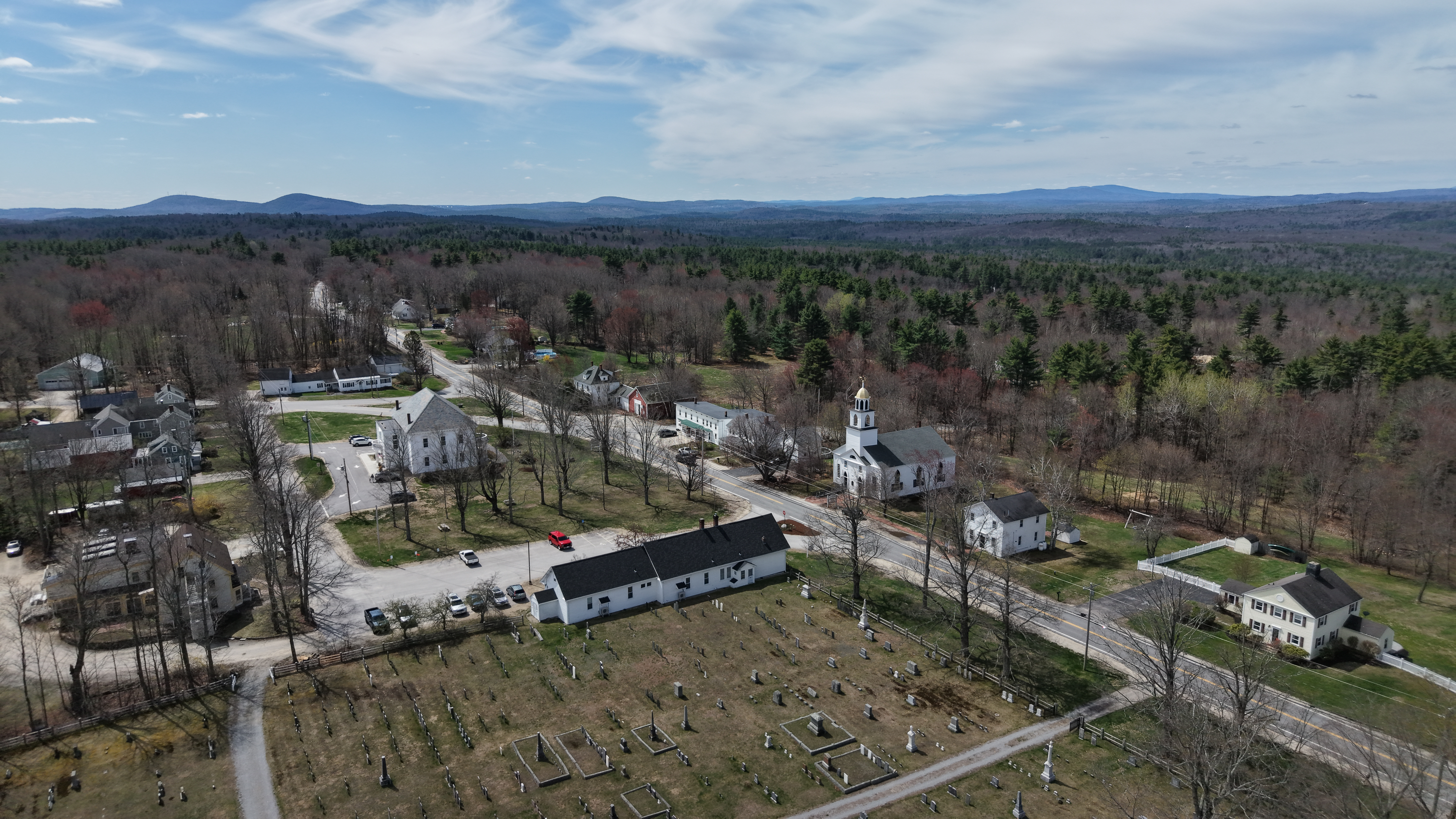
- Dunbarton from the northeast

- Seal

- Location in Merrimack County and the state of New Hampshire
- Coordinates: 43°06′09″N 71°36′59″W
- Country: United States
- State: New Hampshire
- County: Merrimack
- Incorporated: 1765
- Villages: Dunbarton Center; Pages Corner

Area
  - Total: 31.3 sq mi (81.1 km^{2})
  - Land: 30.8 sq mi (79.9 km^{2})
  - Water: 0.46 sq mi (1.2 km^{2}) 1.48%
- Elevation: 705 ft (215 m)

Population (2020)
  - Total: 3,005
  - Density: 97/sq mi (37.6/km^{2})
- Time zone: UTC-5 (Eastern)
  - Summer (DST): UTC-4 (Eastern)
- ZIP code: 03046
- Area code: 603
- FIPS code: 33-19460
- GNIS feature ID: 873583
- Website: www.dunbartonnh.org

Dunbarton is a town in Merrimack County, New Hampshire, United States. The population was 3,005 at the 2020 census, up from 2,758 at the 2010 census.

== History ==
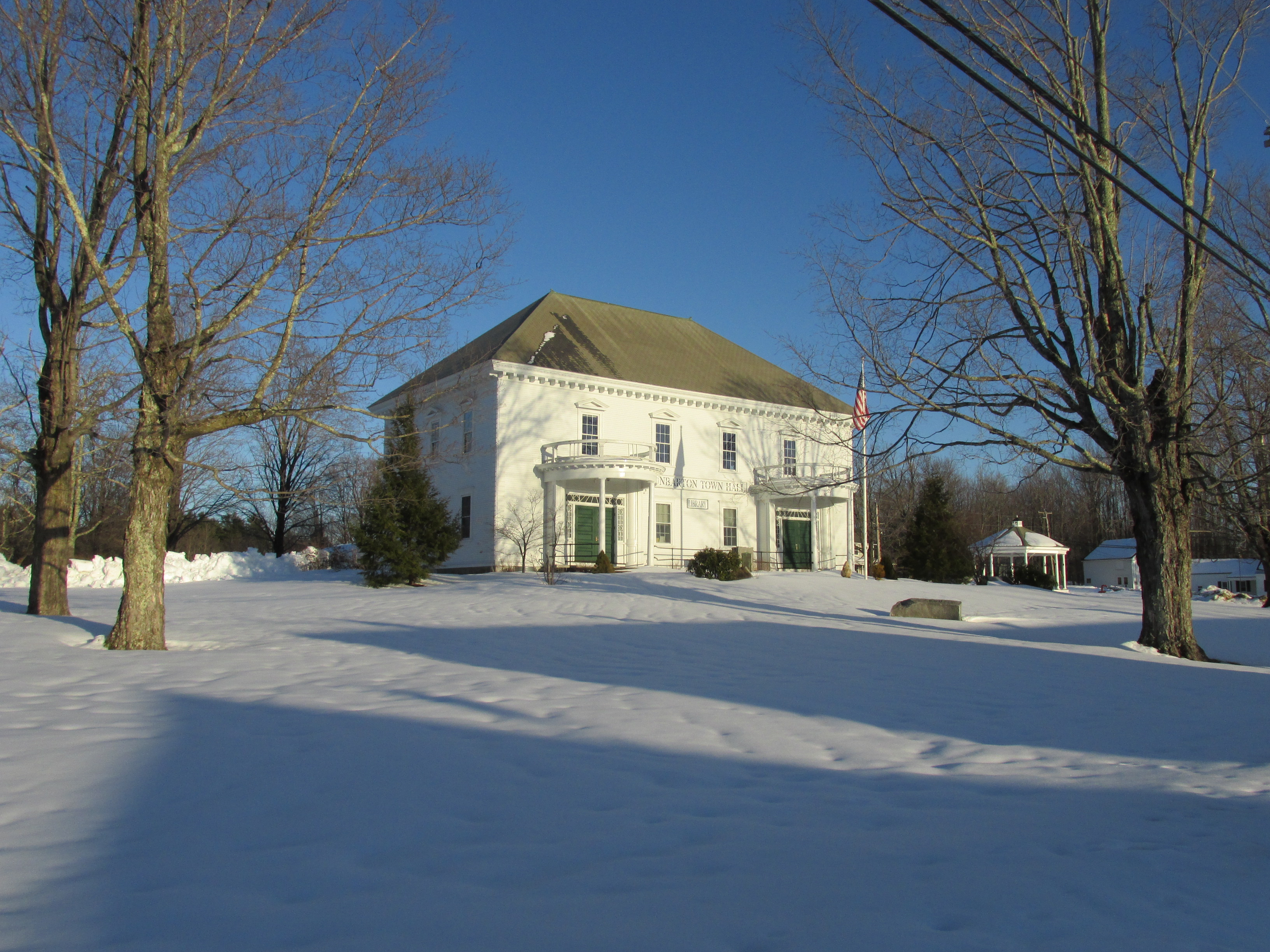
Library and Town Hall

Originally granted as "Gorham's-town" in 1735, and re-granted as "Starkstown" in 1748, the town was incorporated in 1765 as Dunbarton. The name came from Dunbartonshire in Scotland, hometown to Archibald Stark, a prominent settler.

== Geography ==
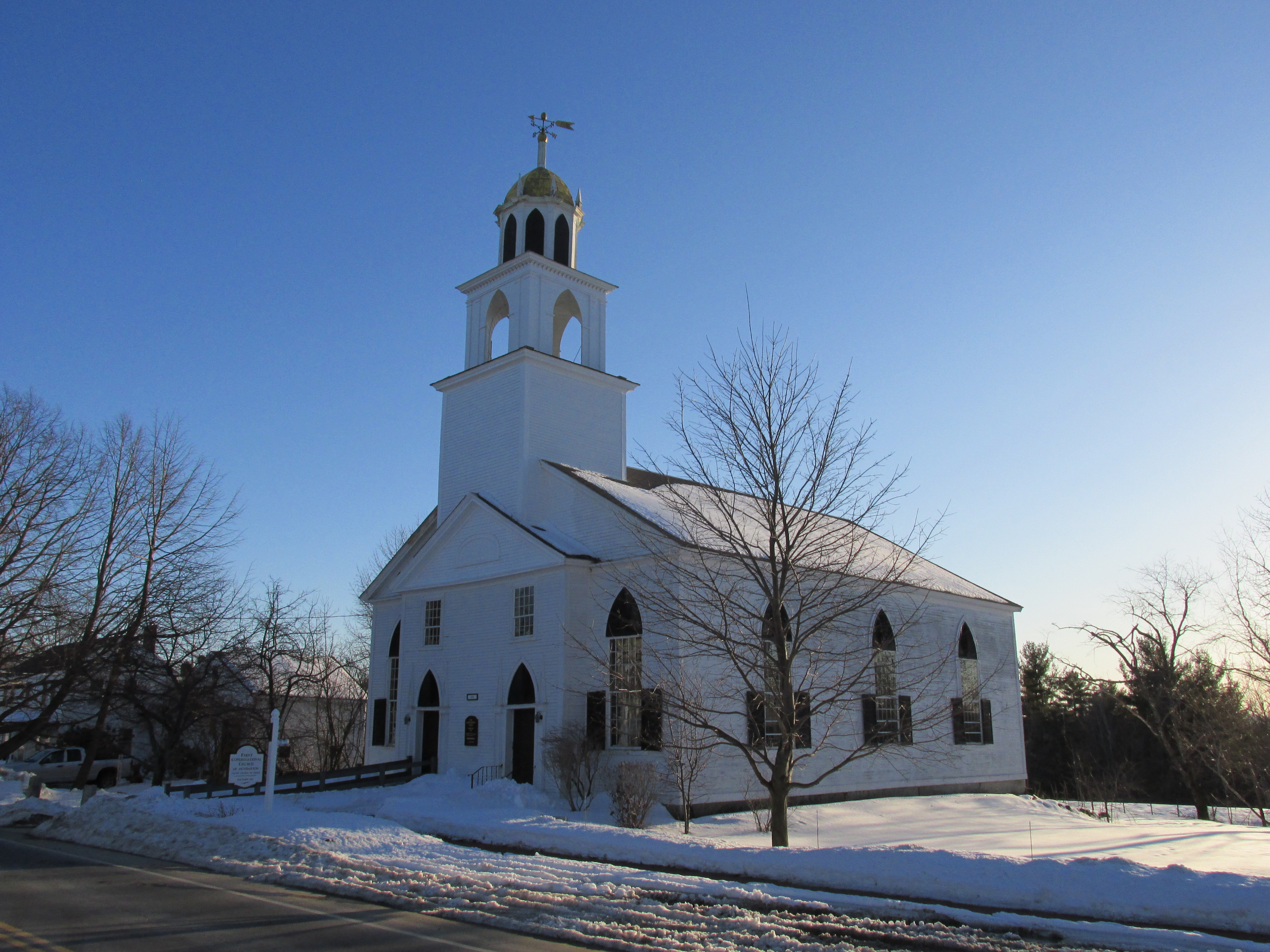
First Congregational Church

According to the United States Census Bureau, the town has a total area of 31.3 square miles (81.1 km^{2}), of which 30.8 square miles (79.9 km^{2}) are land and 0.46 square miles (1.2 km^{2}) are water, comprising 1.48% of the town. The town is drained to the northeast by tributaries of the Turkey River, to the southeast by Black Brook and its tributaries, and to the west by tributaries of the Piscataquog River. The entire town is within the Merrimack River watershed. The highest point in Dunbarton is 925 feet (282 m) above sea level near NH Route 13 north of Dunbarton Center.

The town claims to be the location of the geographic center of New England, based on a Boston University calculation from 2008.

=== Adjacent municipalities ===
- Bow (northeast)
- Hooksett (east)
- Goffstown (south)
- Weare (west)
- Hopkinton (north)

== Demographics ==
Historical population
Census	Pop.	Note	%±
1790	917		—
1800	1,222		33.3%
1810	1,256		2.8%
1820	1,450		15.4%
1830	1,067		−26.4%
1840	950		−11.0%
1850	915		−3.7%
1860	901		−1.5%
1870	778		−13.7%
1880	708		−9.0%
1890	524		−26.0%
1900	551		5.2%
1910	513		−6.9%
1920	405		−21.1%
1930	572		41.2%
1940	495		−13.5%
1950	533		7.7%
1960	632		18.6%
1970	825		30.5%
1980	1,174		42.3%
1990	1,759		49.8%
2000	2,226		26.5%
2010	2,758		23.9%
2020	3,005		9.0%
U.S. Decennial Census

As of the census of 2000, there were 2,226 people, 814 households, and 648 families residing in the town. The population density was 72.1 inhabitants per square mile (27.8/km^{2}). There were 858 housing units at an average density of 27.8 per square mile (10.7/km^{2}). The racial makeup of the town was 98.43% White, 0.09% African American, 0.45% Native American, 0.45% Asian, 0.04% from other races, and 0.54% from two or more races. Hispanic or Latino of any race were 0.31% of the population.

There were 814 households, out of which 39.6% had children under the age of 18 living with them, 73.8% were married couples living together, 3.6% had a female householder with no husband present, and 20.3% were non-families. 14.1% of all households were made up of individuals, and 3.2% had someone living alone who was 65 years of age or older. The average household size was 2.73 and the average family size was 3.03.

In the town, the population was spread out, with 27.5% under the age of 18, 4.0% from 18 to 24, 34.8% from 25 to 44, 26.6% from 45 to 64, and 7.1% who were 65 years of age or older. The median age was 38 years. For every 100 females, there were 102.4 males. For every 100 females age 18 and over, there were 102.6 males.

The median income for a household in the town was $65,081, and the median income for a family was $67,448. Males had a median income of $46,042 versus $31,641 for females. The per capita income for the town was $27,892. About 2.3% of families and 2.8% of the population were below the poverty line, including 2.4% of those under age 18 and 4.9% of those age 65 or over.

== Notable people ==
- Robert Lowell (1917–1977), poet; buried in Stark Cemetery
- John Ordway (1775–1817), helped lead the Lewis and Clark Expedition
- Robert Rogers (1731–1795), commander of Rogers' Rangers during the French and Indian War
- Caleb Stark (1759–1838), New Hampshire state senator
- John Stark (1728–1822), a major general in the Continental Army during the American Revolution
- Molly Stark (1737–1814), wife of General John Stark
