= Molly Stark Lake =

Lake in the state of Minnesota, United States

- Location within Minnesota
- Location: Otter Tail County, Minnesota
- Coordinates: 46°18′57″N 95°40′18″W
- Type: lake
- Surface area: 153 acres (62 ha)
- Average depth: 48 feet (15 m)
- Shore length^{1}: 1.8 miles (2.9 km)
- Settlements: Glendalough State Park
- ^{1} Shore length is not a well-defined measure.

Molly Stark Lake is a lake in Otter Tail County, in the U.S. state of Minnesota. It is almost entirely contained within Glendalough State Park, with some private residences outside the park on the southeast shoreline. The lake was named for Molly Stark, the wife of American Revolutionary War general John Stark.

== See also ==
- List of lakes in Minnesota
