= Starkville =

Starkville may refer to:

- Starkville, Colorado
- Starkville, Georgia
- Starkville, Mississippi
- Starkville, New York
- Starkville, Pennsylvania
