= Cohen Center for Holocaust and Genocide Studies =

Holocaust resource center in New Hampshire, US

Coordinates: 42°55′35″N 72°16′44″W

Cohen Center
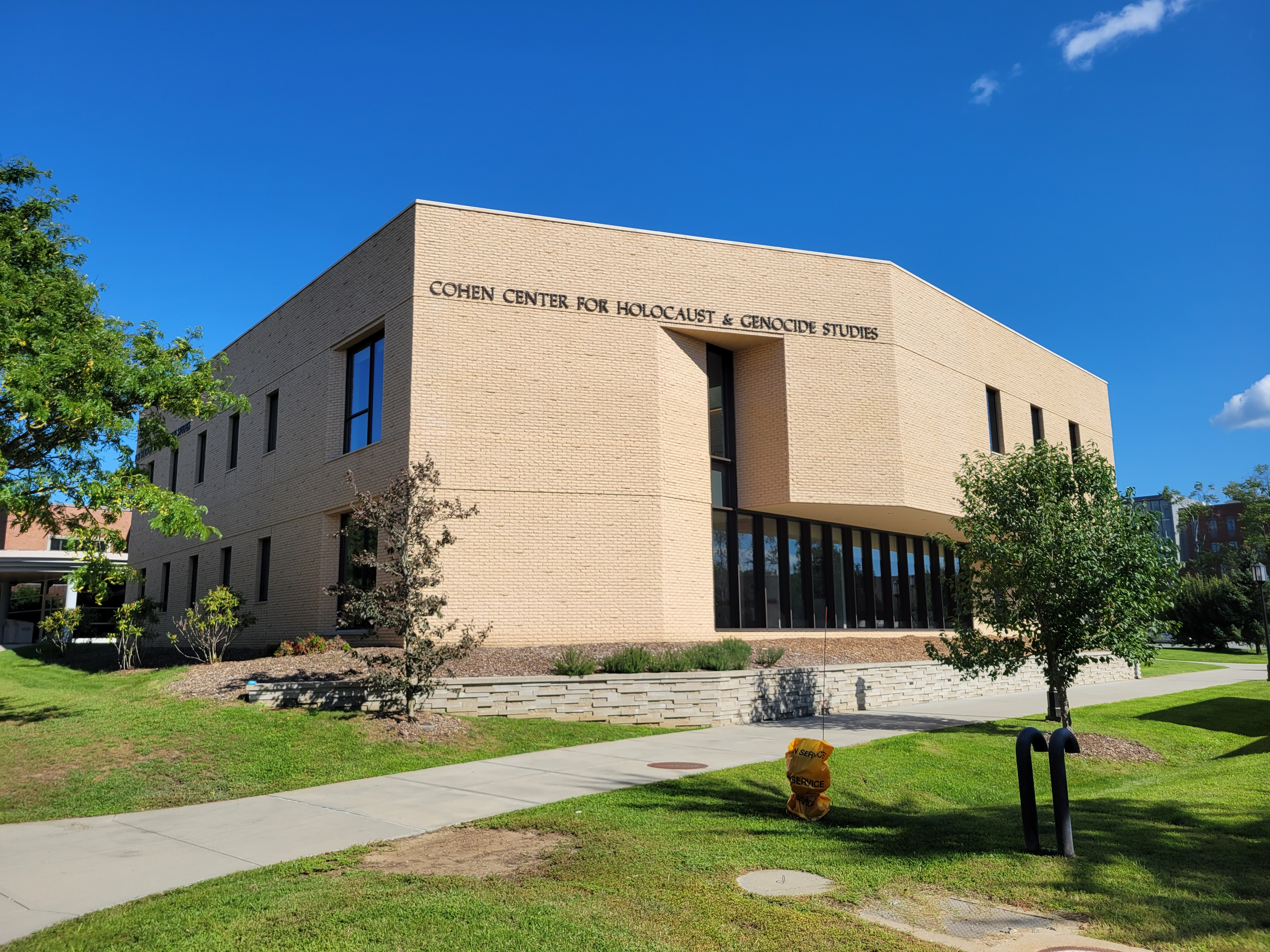
- Cohen Center for Holocaust and Genocide Studies
- Motto: "To Remember…and to Teach"
- Established: 1983
- Administrative staff: Henry F. Knight, Director; Thomas White, Coordinator of Educational Outreach; Michele Kuiawa, Senior Program Support Assistant
- Location: Keene, New Hampshire, USA
- Campus: Keene State College Mason Library
- Website: www.keene.edu/academics/ah/cchgs/

The Cohen Center for Holocaust and Genocide Studies is one of the oldest Holocaust resource centers in the United States. Founded in 1983, the center is located at Keene State College in New Hampshire. The center was founded by Dr. Charles Hildebrandt.

== Overview ==
The Cohen Center is located in the heart of Keene State College on the first floor of Mason Library. Visitors will often find the Center's Susan J. Herman Reading Room in active use, either by a class in the academic program, a meeting or other gathering for the Center, or by students using the room for study and reflection.

The Center provides extensive educational support for the study and the teaching of the Holocaust and genocide in KSC's academic programs that features a nationally recognized undergraduate major in Holocaust and Genocide Studies. The Center also provides materials and support for educators at the elementary, middle school, high school, and college levels. In addition, the Center offers public workshops and other educational programs designed to engage regional residents and community leaders. The Center supports the college's undergraduates and hosts a series of annual events.

To date, over 300 individuals and institutions throughout the state, region, and nation have joined the college in supporting the Cohen Center's efforts to confront antisemitism, intolerance, and hate; and to build communities distinguished by active regard for the welfare of all its citizens. In this spirit, Keene State College through the Cohen Center for Holocaust and Genocide Studies, and a number of other similarly committed programs, embodies an exemplary partnership between public higher education and the communities it serves.

=== Mission ===
The Cohen Center for Holocaust and Genocide Studies advances the public liberal arts mission of Keene State College by studying and bearing witness to the Holocaust and genocide in the hope that present and future generations take responsibility for building a world free of antisemitism, intolerance, and hate. To this end, the Cohen Center joins the campus community and its many partners in promoting an active and informed citizenry committed to mutual respect and justice.

=== History ===
The Cohen Center for Holocaust and Genocide Studies is much more than a resource center, though that is how the center began. In conjunction with his commitments to racial, ethnic, and religious diversity, Prof. Charles Hildebrandt undertook a sabbatical in fall 1982 with the express purpose of establishing a Holocaust Resource Center at Keene State College, to develop a course on the Sociology of the Holocaust, and to become a resource person on the subject for his colleagues and friends of the college in the community. With a little over 200 books collected during his sabbatical, Prof. Hildebrandt opened the Holocaust Resource Center at Keene State College in January 1983.

In 2000, the Center became the Center for Holocaust Studies and then, a year later, the Cohen Center for Holocaust Studies in 2001 when the College received a transformative gift from Jan and Rick Cohen to underwrite significant portions of the Center's work and to name the center in honor of Rick's parents, Lester and Norma Cohen. Later, in September 2009, the name grew to the Cohen Center for Holocaust and Genocide Studies to express the Center's expanded mission to include its study and work with genocide.

The original resource center has grown from a collection of 200 books and other media to a library of nearly 6,000 volumes, which supports the college's academic program in Holocaust and Genocide Studies. The program, the first undergraduate major in Holocaust and Genocide Studies in the nation, includes both an inter-disciplinary major and minor in this subject area. The program became a formal department at the college in 2012.

=== Events ===
The programs sponsored and coordinated by the Cohen Center include two annual public lectures (the Holocaust Memorial Lecture and the Genocide Awareness Lecture), a community-wide Kristallnacht Remembrance Event hosted annually by the Colonial Theatre, yearly trips (one for students, one for community leaders) to the United States Holocaust Memorial Museum, an annual Hildebrandt Awards Night, a yearly commemoration of Yom HaShoah, and a variety of outreach opportunities for educators and other community leaders, including a biennial, residential Summer Institute on Holocaust and Genocide Studies.

Holocaust Memorial Lecture

Held in the fall, the annual Holocaust Memorial Lecture draws prominent scholars, organizers, survivors and family members, and community leaders for an evening of historical perspective and current events.

Kristallnacht Commemoration

This annual event seeks to bring the community together to bear witness and recognize our responsibility to promote an active and informed citizenry, recognize individual and societal responsibility for each other, and foster mutual respect and justice.

Genocide Awareness Lecture

The Genocide Awareness Lecture is designed to encourage people of good will and conscience to give vigilant, public attention to the signs and symptoms of genocide.

=== Staff ===
The Center is guided by a professional staff of three: Kate DeConinck, Director; Tom White, Coordinator of Educational Outreach, and Michele Kuiawa, Senior Program Support Assistant. They are supported by an active, volunteer Advisory Council and work synergistically with members of the faculty in Holocaust and Genocide Studies, especially Prof. C. Paul Vincent, chair of the academic program, and Prof. James Waller, Cohen Professor of Holocaust & Genocide Studies.

=== Awards ===
The Charles Hildebrandt Holocaust and Genocide Studies Award honors Charles Hildebrandt, Keene State College's professor emeritus in sociology and founder of the Holocaust Resource Center at Keene State in 1983. It is given in recognition of excellence in Holocaust or Genocide Studies. Students and members of the local community are invited to submit essays, historical analyses, stories, poems, musical compositions, dance, film, theatre and visual arts exploring and expressing their own personal relationship to or reflections on the Holocaust or genocide. Awards totaling $1000 will be distributed among the top three entrants.

The Susan J. Herman Award for Leadership in Holocaust & Genocide Awareness, which will be permanently endowed, will be used to recognize individuals who have, through personal leadership and actions, stimulated greater understanding of genocide, increased activism on behalf of the victims of crimes against humanity or inspired community engagement in educating people about genocide both historically and in our contemporary world. The Herman Award will be presented in two categories each year.
