= Gen. John Stark House =

Historic house in New Hampshire, United States

- U.S. National Register of Historic Places
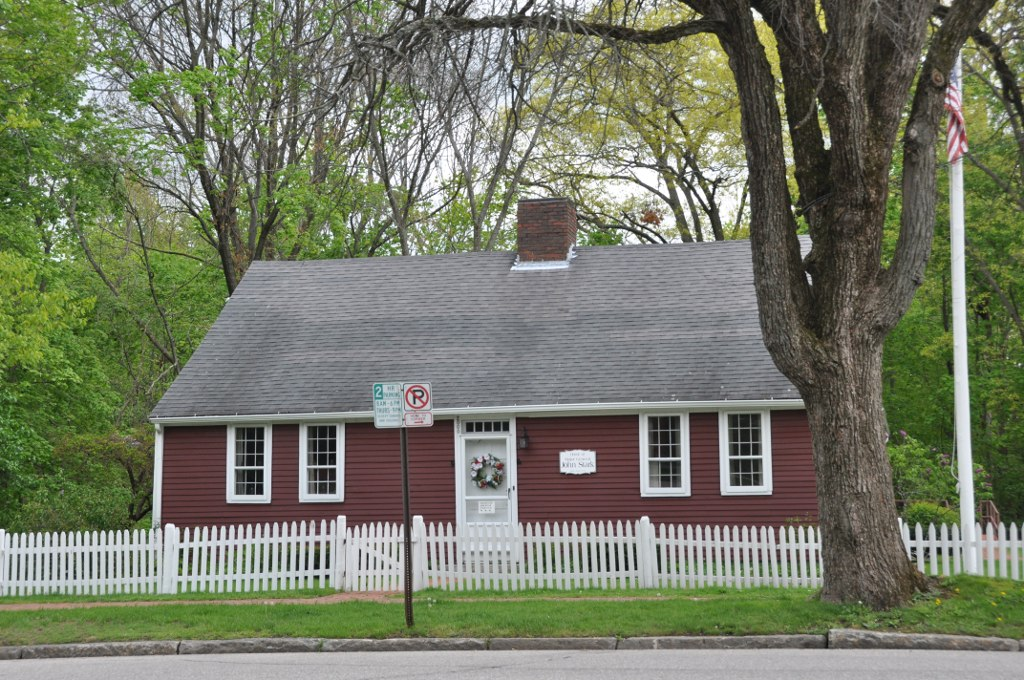

- Location within New Hampshire Location within the United States
- Location: 2000 Elm St., Manchester, New Hampshire
- Coordinates: 43°0′30″N 71°28′0″W
- Area: 1.3 acres (0.53 ha)
- Built: 1736
- NRHP reference No.: 73000166
- Added to NRHP: June 29, 1973

The Gen. John Stark House is a historic house museum at 2000 Elm Street in Manchester, New Hampshire. The house, a single-story Cape style farmhouse, was built in 1736 by Archibald Stark. Stark's son John, a hero of the American Revolutionary War, lived in this house from 1736 to 1765; it is where he brought his new bride Molly, and where two of their children were born. It was listed on the National Register of Historic Places in 1973. It is now operated as a museum by the local chapter of the Daughters of the American Revolution.

== Description and history ==
The General John Stark House is located north of downtown Manchester, at the southwest corner of Elm and Waldo Streets. It is a 1 1/2-story wood-frame structure, with a gabled roof, central chimney, and clapboarded exterior. A single-story ell extends to the rear, giving the house an overall L shape. The main facade is five bays wide, with a center entrance topped by a multilight transom window, and nine-over-six windows in the flanking bays. The interior follows a typical center-chimney plan, with a narrow entrance vestibule and parlors on either side of the chimney. The kitchen extends across much of the back, with small chambers in the corners, with the stairway to the attic in the northwest corner.

The house was built on the 800-acre (320 ha) farm of Archibald Stark in 1736, and is where his family was raised. Originally located on Canal Street, the house remained in the Stark family until 1821. It was acquired by the Amoskeag Manufacturing Company in 1835, and used for worker housing. In 1937 the company donated the building to the local chapter of the Daughters of the American Revolution, which restored the property and adapted it for use as a meeting site. It was moved to its present site, which is also part of the Stark farm, in 1968.

== See also ==
- Stark Park
- National Register of Historic Places listings in Hillsborough County, New Hampshire
