= James Waller =

American scholar

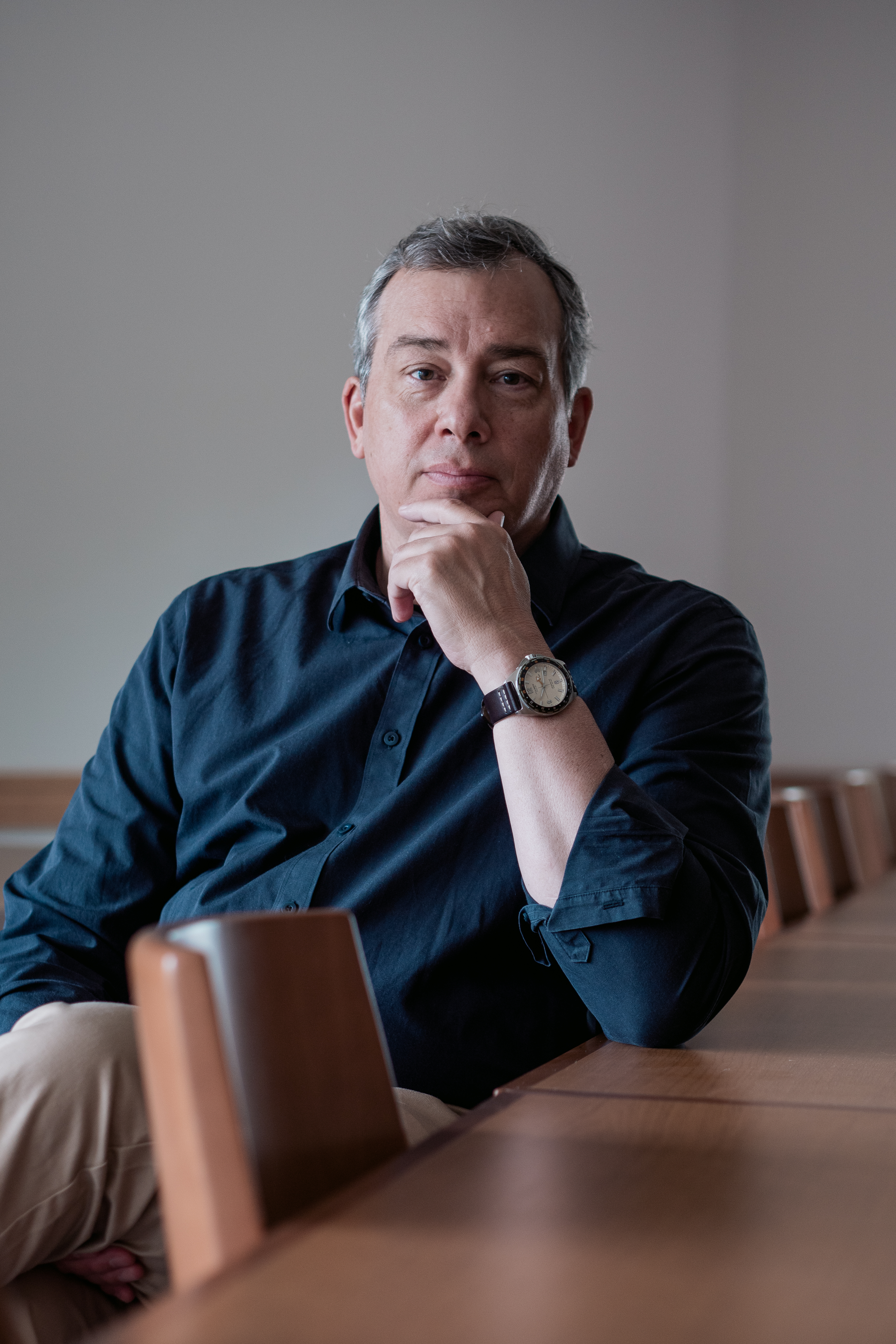
Dr. James E. Waller

Dr. James E. Waller is an American social and political psychologist whose work focuses on the psychology of rank-and-file perpetrator behavior, the prevention of genocide and other forms of mass atrocity, and human rights. As of 2026, he is a recognized scholar in the field of Holocaust and genocide studies. He currently resides as the Gladstein Family Distinguished Chair in Human Rights at the University of Connecticut (UConn). At UConn, he is also the Acting Director of the Gladstein Family Human Rights Institute and is a Professor of Literatures, Cultures, Languages, and Human Rights.

Previously to his work at UConn, Waller was the inaugural Cohen Professor of Holocaust and Genocide Studies at Keene State College from 2010-2023, home to the nation’s first undergraduate major in Holocaust and Genocide Studies. Additionally, he directed and taught Keene State's annual Scheidt Family Summer Institute on Genocide Studies and Prevention. Prior to his appointment at Keene State College, Waller was a Professor of Psychology at Whitworth University and was the Edward B. Lindaman Chair from 2003-2007.

Waller is a widely recognized scholar in the field of Holocaust and genocide studies and has also held visiting research professorships at Technische Universität Berlin in Germany (1990), the Catholic University of Eichstätt-Ingolstadt in Eichstatt, Germany (1992), and in the Institute for Global Peace, Security & Justice at Queen’s University Belfast in Belfast, Northern Ireland (2017, 2023-2029). Waller has been awarded summer fellowships by, and been a teaching fellow with, the Holocaust Educational Foundation at Northwestern University (1996 and 2007-2012), and the Center for Advanced Holocaust Studies at the U.S. Holocaust Memorial Museum in Washington, D.C. (1999, 2003, and 2005).

His fieldwork has included research in Germany, Israel, Northern Ireland, the former Yugoslavia, Rwanda, Uganda, Tanzania, Argentina, Chile, and Guatemala. Waller also has completed certification work in safety and security after violent conflict at Queen’s University Belfast (2016).

== Scholarly works ==
In 1996, Waller developed a study program titled "Prejudice Across America." The program drew national media attention and was named by President Bill Clinton's Initiative on Race as one of America's "Promising Practices for Racial Reconciliation." Many of the experiences from the study program are chronicled in Waller's first book, Face to Face: The Changing State of Racism Across America (Perseus Books, 1998) and in a second book, Prejudice Across America (University Press of Mississippi, 2000). Prejudice Across America was short-listed for a 2001 Outstanding Book Award from Boston University's Gustavus Myers Center for the Study of Bigotry and Human Rights in North America.

His book on perpetrators of genocide, Becoming Evil: How Ordinary People Commit Genocide and Mass Killing (Oxford University Press, 2002), was praised by Publishers Weekly for “clearly and effectively synthesizing a wide range of studies to develop an original and persuasive model of the process by which people can become evil.” In addition to being used as a textbook in college and university courses around the world, Becoming Evil also was short-listed for the biennial Raphael Lemkin Book Award from the Institute for the Study of Genocide. Concepts from Becoming Evil, released in a revised and updated second edition in 2007, have been the basis for an international best-selling novel (The Exception by Christian Jungersen) and a play workshopped in the School of Theater, Film, and Television at UCLA. His research on perpetrator behavior also is featured in Eduardo Rufeisen's award-winning documentary The Evil Within (2016).

Waller's fifth book, Confronting Evil: Engaging Our Responsibility to Prevent Genocide (Oxford University Press, 2016), discusses genocide prevention and responsibility for intervention.

His sixth and most recent book, A Troubled Sleep: Risk and Resilience in Contemporary Northern Ireland was released by Oxford University Press in 2021 and has been praised as a “model for scholarship on contemporary issues” and as a "comprehensive guide on Northern Ireland’s post-Trouble’s society."

In addition to these books, Waller has published more than thirty articles in peer-reviewed professional journals, contributed over twenty chapters in edited books, was a co-editor of Historical Dialogue and the Prevention of Mass Atrocities (Routledge, 2020), and is a co-editor of the forthcoming Anthem Handbook on Atrocity Prevention (Anthem Press, 2028).

== Engaged research ==
In the policymaking arena, Waller has developed and led seminars to introduce government officials and security sector personnel from around the world to issues of genocide warning and prevention. To date, these seminars have trained over 13,500 personnel from more than 90 countries. In addition, he is a frequent lecturer in advanced investigation trainings offered by the International Human Rights Unit of the Federal Bureau of Investigation and the interagency Human Rights Violators and War Crimes Center. Waller also has held recurrent consultancy contracts with the United Nations Office on Genocide Prevention and the Responsibility to Protect.

Waller has led teacher training in Holocaust and genocide studies for the Holocaust Center for Humanity (2009 and 2012), the North Carolina Center for the Advancement of Teaching (2010), the U.S. Holocaust Memorial Museum (2010-2012, 2015), the Zoryan Institute (2015, 2016, 2021-2026), and the Max M. Kaplan Summer Institute at the Holocaust Museum Houston (2018 and 2020-2024). In addition, he has consulted on exhibition development for the United States Holocaust Memorial Museum, the Kigali Genocide Memorial Centre in Rwanda, the Genocide Prevention Institute at the Bremen Jewish Heritage Museum in Atlanta, GA, and the Illinois Holocaust Museum and Education Center.

== Awards and prizes ==
At Whitworth University, Waller’s achievements in teaching and scholarship were reflected in his selection as the 1993 recipient of the Dean's Award for Outstanding Junior Faculty Achievement, the 1996 recipient of Whitworth's Teaching Excellence Award, and a 2008 nominee for Whitworth’s Innovative Teaching Award. In addition, he was a four-time institutional nominee for the CASE U.S. Professor of the Year award. 2012, he was Keene State College's institutional nominee for the Joseph B. and Toby Gittler Prize from Brandeis University, an award given in recognition of scholarly contributions to racial, ethnic, and/or religious relations. In 2025, Waller was nominated for an Undergraduate Research Mentorship Excellence Award at UConn. A selected list of recent honors received include:

- During 1999-2000, Waller was one of sixteen national recipients of the prestigious Pew Fellowship Award to continue his work on the psychology of human evil.
- In June 2007, Waller received the “First Voice Humanitarian Award” from the Chicago Center for Urban Life & Culture in recognition of his work in connecting students with urban communities in need.
- In January 2009, he was selected for the inaugural class of Carl Wilkins Fellows by the Genocide Intervention Network.
- In November 2011, Waller was recognized by a California Senate Resolution for “his tireless efforts to end genocide.”
- Waller was appointed as the Centennial Global Ethics Fellow of the Carnegie Council for Ethics in International Affairs for 2013-2014.
- In September 2015, he was named a Peace Ambassador by the Center for Peacebuilding in Sanski Most, Bosnia-Herzegovina.
- December 11, 2016, was proclaimed by Charles Rangel, US Representative for New York’s 13^{th} Congressional District, as “A Day in Honor of James Waller” in recognition of his international work in genocide prevention.
- In April 2017, Waller was selected as the recipient of the inaugural International Association of Genocide Scholars’ Engaged Scholarship Prize. The Prize recognizes exemplary scholarship along with engagement in genocide awareness and prevention.

== Educational background ==
Waller received his B.S. (1983) from Asbury University (KY), M.S. (1985) from the University of Colorado, and Ph.D. in Social psychology (1988) from the University of Kentucky.

== Professional and public service ==
Waller is a member of the International Expert Team of the Institute for Research of Genocide Canada and sits on several advisory or editorial boards, including World Without Genocide, the Eastern European Holocaust Studies journal of the Babyn Yar Holocaust Memorial Center, the Board of Scholars for Facing History & Ourselves, the Journal of Perpetrator Research, the Yearbook of the Institute for Research of Crimes Against Humanity and International Law of the University of Sarajevo, and the Cambridge Elements in Genocide Studies book series. Waller is a sought-after speaker on Holocaust and genocide studies for academic, professional, and public audiences. He has lectured at more than 150 colleges and universities, including the University of Massachusetts, Boston University, Claremont-McKenna College, Notre Dame, Yale University, Columbia University, the US Military Academy at West Point, the American University of Paris, William & Mary Law School, and Syracuse University.

Endowed lectures Waller has delivered include the 2010 Karl Schleunes Lecture at Greensboro College, the 2011 Richard J. Yashak Holocaust Lecture at Albright College, the 2015 and 2018 Ralph L. Harris Memorial Lecture at Sonoma State University, the inaugural Walter Sommers Lecture on Holocaust History at CANDLES Holocaust Museum in 2016, the 2018 Gerald S. Kaplan Distinguished Lecture at the Holocaust Museum Houston, the 2024 Gedalyah Engel Distinguished Lecture at Purdue University, and the 2024 and 2025 Adele Zygielbaum Memorial Lecture at Sonoma State University. He has written for The Washington Post, The Irish News, and The Conversation and is frequently interviewed by broadcast and print media, including PBS, CNN, CBC, Al Jazeera, the Los Angeles Times, Salon, National Geographic, and The New York Times.

== Bibliography ==
- Face to Face: The Changing State of Racism Across America. (Perseus Books, 1998) ISBN 978-0-7382-0613-4
- Prejudice Across America (University Press of Mississippi, 2000) ISBN 978-1-57806-313-0
- Becoming Evil: How Ordinary People Commit Genocide and Mass Killing. (Oxford University Press 2002) 1st Edition.
- Becoming Evil: How Ordinary People Commit Genocide and Mass Killing. (Oxford University Press 2007) 2nd Edition. ISBN 978-0-19-531456-4
- Confronting Evil: Engaging Our Responsibility to Prevent Genocide (Oxford University Press, 2016)
- A Troubled Sleep: Risk and Resilience in Contemporary Northern Ireland (Oxford University Press, 2021) ISBN 978-0-19-009557-4
