= Stark's Knob =

Rock formation in New York, United States

Coordinates: 43°7′5.76″N 73°35′15.77″W

Stark's Knob is a basaltic pillow lava formation near Schuylerville, New York, United States. It formed about 460 to 440 million years ago in relatively shallow sea water. It is often mistakenly referred to as a volcano, probably because early investigators described it as a volcano or volcanic plug.

It was here during the Saratoga Campaign of the American Revolution that General John Stark of New Hampshire cut off the retreat of British General John Burgoyne's army, hence its name.

== Geology ==
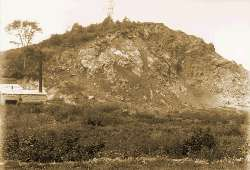
A 1912 picture of Stark's Knob. Note how the right side (northern half) is stripped bare of vegetation.

Stark's Knob formed in the Connecticut River Valley during the Taconic orogeny, when the shrinking Iapetus Ocean caused marine sediments to accrete onto the coast of the North American continent. This bulldozing effect also inevitably dragged in an island chain that probably resembled the Japanese Island chain. As a result, pressure in the rocks caused magma to erupt on the sea floor. The pillow lava that eventually formed Stark's Knob flowed out of these cracks and onto the sea floor. Fossils of snails found in sedimentary rock sandwiched between the pillows indicate that the lava formed during the early, or more likely, Middle Ordovician age. The snails also show that the lava was formed in shallow seas, as the species of snail was native to shallow water. Eventually the rocks were pushed up and out of the water. Over time, the rock was upthrust and tilted to a westerly direction. The thrusting also pushed the rock from the Connecticut River Valley to its present location, just west of the Hudson River.

== History ==
=== Revolutionary War ===
During the American Revolution's Saratoga Campaign, the knob provided a crucial asset for American forces led by General John Stark. Forces were stationed between the knob and the nearby Hudson River to block possible escape of British forces led by General John Burgoyne. British forces were in nearby Schuylerville at the time, just south of the knob. Accounts differ to what happened next, but either Stark's forces placed cannons on the knob or, more likely, placed them at the base of it, blocking the only avenue of escape for the surrounded British. The knob is named for General Stark.

=== Modern history ===
In 1916, the property was deeded to the state. This was partly to prevent the mining of the formation for use in road building. After many years of virtual neglect and a number of proposals to sell the property, the state finally decided to take action to prevent the site's further decay as well as curb vandalism and maintain trails. In 2005, the site was incorporated into the master plan of Hudson Crossing Park, a bi-county park centered on Champlain Canal Lock 5 Island.
