= Stark Park =

- U.S. National Register of Historic Places
- NH State Register of Historic Places
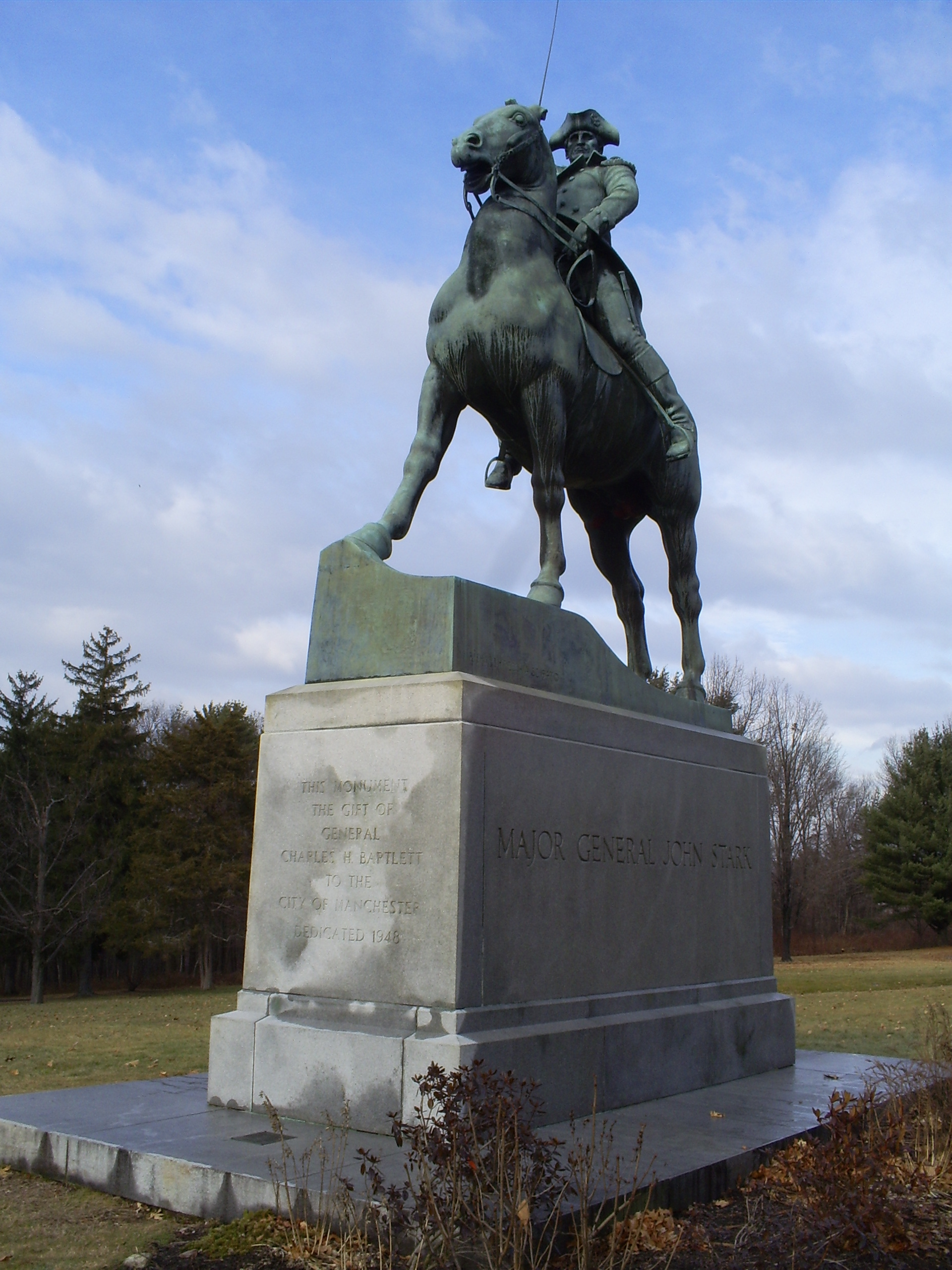
- Statue of John Stark by Richard Recchia, 1948

- Location within New Hampshire Location within the United States
- Location: Bounded by N. River Rd., Park Ave., and Merrimack River, Manchester, New Hampshire
- Coordinates: 43.01446°N 71.46950°W
- Area: 30 acres (12 ha)
- Built: 1892
- NRHP reference No.: 06000505

Significant dates
- Added to NRHP: June 14, 2006
- Designated NHSRHP: July 19, 2010

Stark Park is a city park located on the north side of Manchester, New Hampshire. It is a 30-acre (12 ha) parcel of land between River Road and the Merrimack River, which was once part of the larger farm property of American Revolutionary War hero John Stark. It was listed on the U.S. National Register of Historic Places in 2006, and the New Hampshire State Register of Historic Places in 2010.

== History and description ==
The centerpieces of the park are the Stark Burial Ground, where Stark and some of his family are interred, and the 1948 bronze equestrian statue of Stark made by sculptor Richard Henry Recchia. The park was formally opened in 1893, making it one of the city's oldest parks (only Derryfield Park is older). It was originally designed as a typical Victorian-era park, with winding lanes, and a mix of woodlands, lawns, and gardens. A colonnade of elm trees originally lined the three land borders of the park, but were lost to Dutch Elm disease in the 20th century. Some of its paths and vistas have also become overgrown since the park was established.

The Stark family originally owned about 800 acres (320 ha) of land in what is now northern Manchester. John Stark was buried here after his death in 1822, and the family erected a memorial obelisk in 1829. Stark's great-grandchildren deeded a two-acre (0.81 ha) area surrounding the family cemetery to the city in 1876. Public interest for a larger park memorializing Stark took place in the 1880s, and the family gave another 28 acres (11 ha) to the city in 1891. The initial design of the park was made by Morton & Quimby, landscape architects from Boston, Massachusetts, and it was formally dedicated on June 17, 1893.

== See also ==
- Gen. John Stark House
- National Register of Historic Places listings in Hillsborough County, New Hampshire
- New Hampshire Historical Marker No. 225: Stark Park
