= Harriet Lane Huntress =

American civil servant

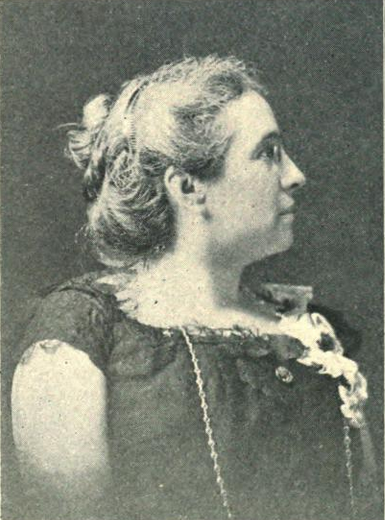
Harriet Lane Huntress

Harriet Lane Huntress (November 30, 1860 - July 31, 1922) was an American civil servant. She served as the Deputy Superintendent of Public Instruction in New Hampshire, being the first woman in New England appointed to such a position. She was also prominent in the civic and social life of the state. The Harriet Lane Huntress dormitory for female students at Keene Normal School (now Keene State College) was named in her honor.

== Biography ==
Harriet Lane Huntress was born in Meredith (now Center Harbor, New Hampshire), November 30, 1860. She was the daughter of James Lewis and Harriet Perkins (Page) Huntress. Her father was the proprietor of the Senter House, a summer resort on Lake Winnipesaukee. Huntress came from sturdy stock. Her ancestors were among the first settlers of New Hampshire, coming from the North of Ireland of Scotch ancestry, and for generation after generation became prominent people in the locality where they lived. This was so on both sides of her lineage. They were all New Hampshire people and remained there with very few exceptions. Molly Stark was kin.

Huntress was educated in private schools in Massachusetts, graduating from Prospect Hill School, Greenfield, in 1879. She had regrets about the private school education, often having expressed the feeling that if she had attended a public school it would have been of assistance to her in the work of her life.

From 1879, she resided in Concord, New Hampshire. In 1889, she began a connection with the state department of public instruction. She served as chief clerk of the New Hampshire Department of Public Instruction, from April of that year, serving under Superintendents Patterson, Gowing, Folsom and Morrison. In September 1913, she was appointed deputy superintendent, being the first woman in New England appointed to such position, and continuing in the role until her death. In 1919, she was particularly zealous and successful in the then proposed Educational Act for New Hampshire. She showed great enthusiasm in helping put it into effect; and with initiative, resourcefulness and admirable workmanship, developed her department in the new system.

Hunter developed the index used in the 1903 edition of the history of Concord.

In 1920, in recognition of her services to the cause of education, New Hampshire College conferred upon her the honorary degree of Master of Arts.

Huntress was an active worker in the New Hampshire Equal Suffrage Association (member, advisory board), and a faithful supporter of the Unitarian church. She was a member of the Concord Woman's Club, Country Club, Beaver Meadow Golf Club, Woman's City Club of Boston, New Hampshire Historical Society, Capital Grange, Rumford Chapter, Daughters of the American Revolution, and the Mount Vernon Ladies' Association (vice-regent for New Hampshire), whose work she represented in New Hampshire.

== Death and legacy ==
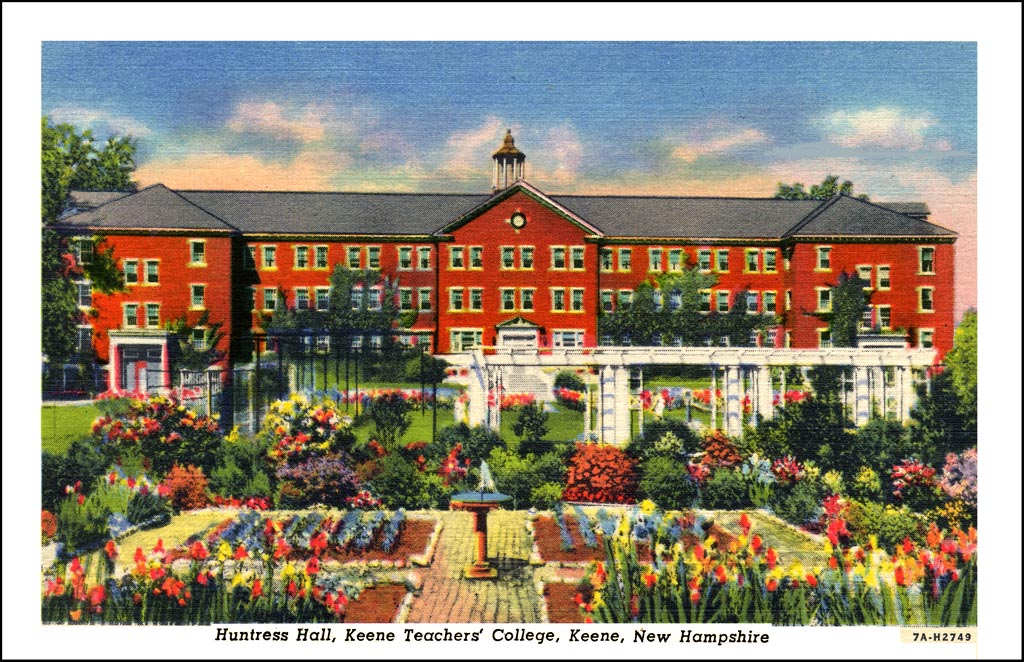
Huntress Hall, Keene State College, Keene, NH

Absent from her job since February 1922 on account of illness, Huntress died at her home in Concord, July 31, 1922. She was mourned throughout the state, and the state schools, with flags flying at half-staff, closed their doors for the day. Her papers are held by the Archives of the Mount Vernon Ladies' Association at the Fred W. Smith National Library for the Study of George Washington at Mount Vernon.

Constructed in 1925, Keene Normal School (now Keene State College) honored Huntress by conferring her name to the Harriet Lane Huntress dormitory for female students.
