= WKNH =

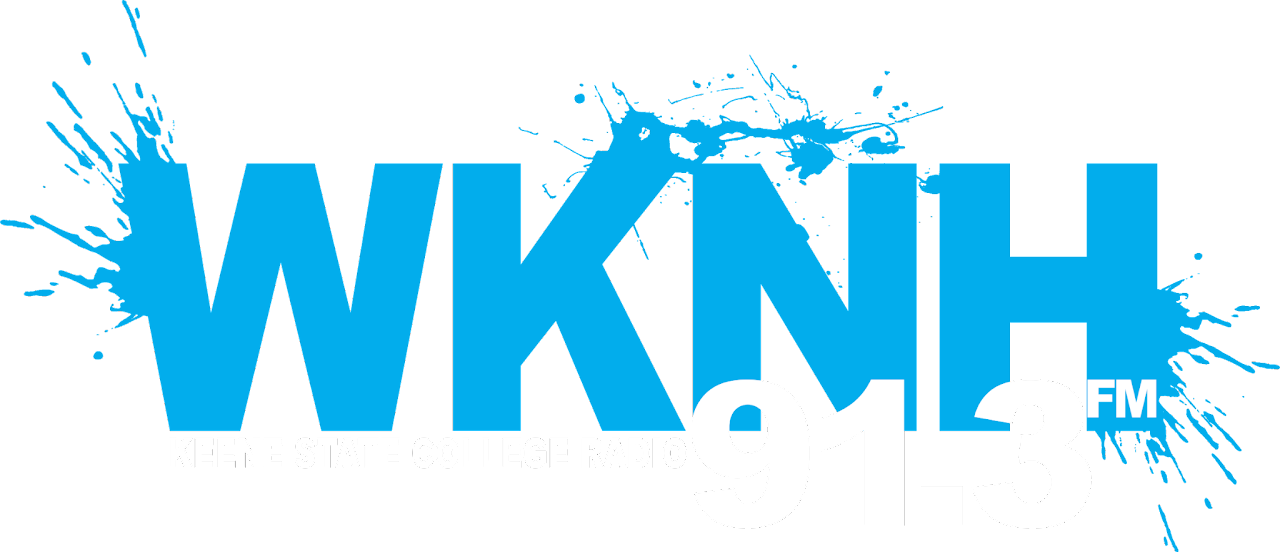
- Keene, New Hampshire; United States
- Frequency: 91.3 MHz
- Branding: Keene 91.3 FM

Programming
- Format: College

Ownership
- Owner: Keene State College

History
- First air date: 1971
- Former call signs: WKSC
- Former frequencies: 89.1 MHz
- Call sign meaning: We Know New Hampshire

Technical information
- Licensing authority: FCC
- Facility ID: 6681
- Class: A
- ERP: 275 watts
- HAAT: −118 meters (−387 ft)
- Transmitter coordinates: 42°55′36.2″N 72°16′52.3″W

Links
- Public license information: Public file; LMS
- Webcast: Listen live
- Website: www.wknh.rocks

WKNH (91.3 FM, "Keene 91.3 FM") is a student-run radio station licensed to serve Keene, New Hampshire. The station is owned by Keene State College.

KSC airs a college radio format. The WKNH studios are located on the third floor of the Young Student Center on the Keene State College campus.

== History ==
The station started out as WKNH 89.1 FM - The Sound Alternative and was initially sponsored by long-time KSC staff member Lou Dumont. Early station managers like Lisa Mesce, Stephanie Hamitty and Ken Wilson built a foundation based on "creativity and excellence". Early music directors Steve Tyrrell and Bill Harris created open format programming allowing on-air personnel extensive creative control over programming. WKNH provided programming 7 days a week and 24 hours a day on the weekends. Al Dalton and Mark Barlow were the anchors of the weekend programming. Starting on Friday evening Dalton provided the overnight "All Night Rock and Roll Show" and Barlow ended it with the "Sunday Sundown Jazz Show" In between those anchors on-air talent such as Steve Tyrrell, Marshall Hall, Bob Zurek, Judy Belanger, Kevin Riley, Kevin Lemeiux, Karen Croland and Bill Verdere made certain WKNH was continually on the air. Charles Moser directed an award-winning news staff. WKNH promoted live in-studio music programming, local dances and concerts. Musicians such as Jonathan Edwards, Tom Rush, Whole Wheat, Atlanta Rhythm Section, James Taylor, Bela Fleck, Dave Malett, Earth Wind and Fire and America showed up at WKNH to chat and provide listeners an excerpt of new music or upcoming concerts.

== Programming ==
Music played on WKNH includes alternative rock, indie rock, world music, jazz, reggae, hip hop, hardcore, metal, folk, and other eclectic selections typical of college radio stations. WKNH was previously affiliated with Pacifica Radio. Longform programming previously included shows news and commentary shows such as Pacifica's Democracy Now. The station's DJ content is predominantly student and local community member-based, with basic DJ qualifications being "if you are a Keene State College student, faculty member, or a member of the Keene community within driving distance [to the station]". The station airs live performances of plays, bands and poetry on a regular basis, which is posted on the station's website previous to the events. WKNH began streaming its programming live on the internet from its wknh.org website on January 1, 2006.

== Community work ==
In November 2012, WKNH released a compilation of rare and unreleased acoustic tracks called Give Some to the Starving Artist featuring songs from Max Bemis of Say Anything, Owen, The Civil Wars, and Someone Still Loves You Boris Yeltsin among others. All proceeds from the compilation went towards the funding and continued operation of the Keene arts venue/collective The Starving Artist. The compilation also featured songs from local artists along with album art created by graphic designers from The Keene State Equinox.

== See also ==
- College radio
- List of college radio stations in the United States
