= Statue of John Stark =

Statue in the U.S. Capitol

John Stark
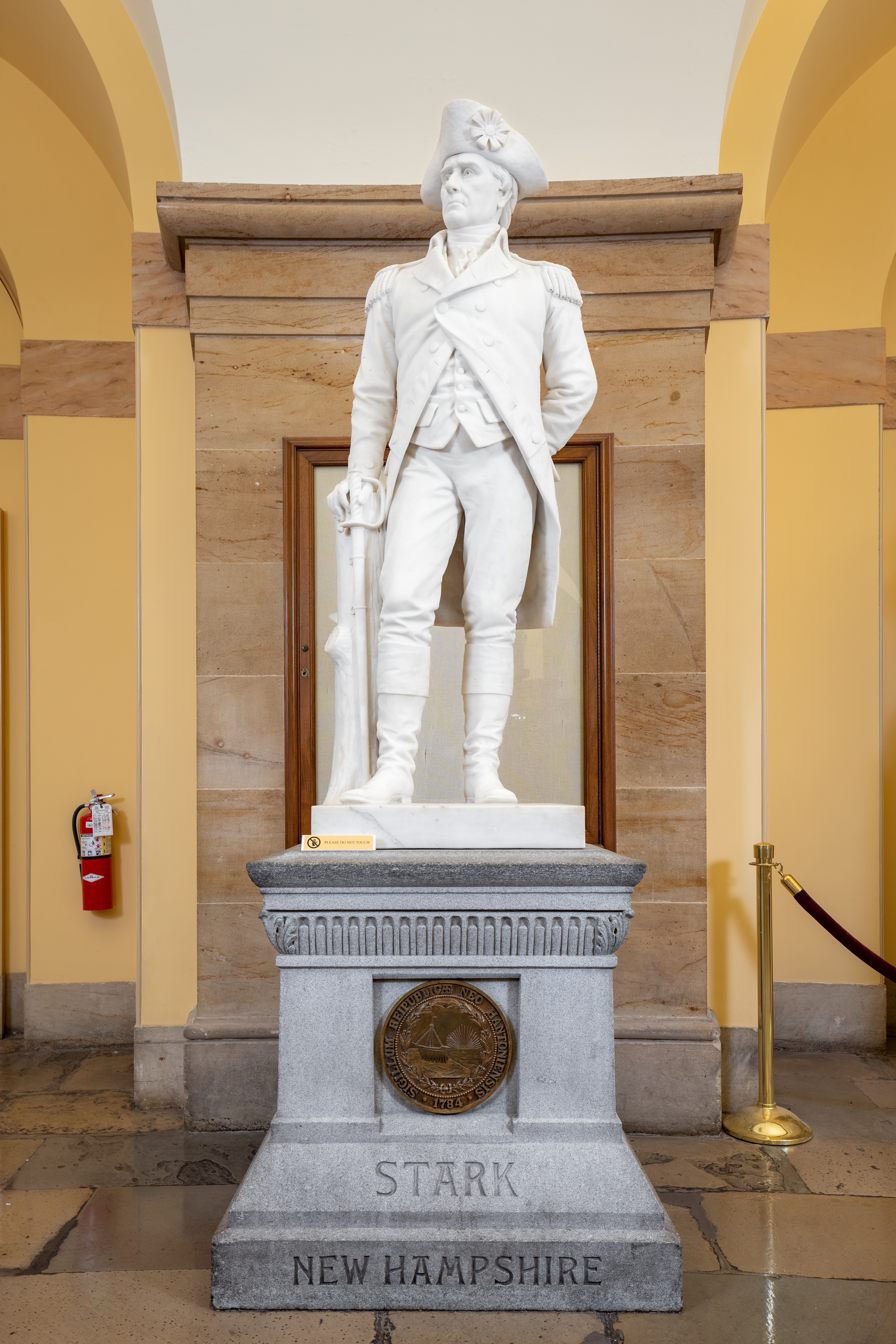
- The statue at the U.S. Capitol crypt in 2022
- Artist: Carl Conrads
- Medium: Marble sculpture
- Subject: John Stark
- Location: Washington, D.C., United States

John Stark is a marble sculpture depicting John Stark by Carl Conrads, installed in the United States Capitol's crypt, in Washington, D.C., as part of the National Statuary Hall Collection. The statue was donated by the U.S. state of New Hampshire in 1894.

== See also ==
- 1894 in art
