= Dinsmoor–Hale House =

Historic house in New Hampshire, United States

- U.S. National Register of Historic Places
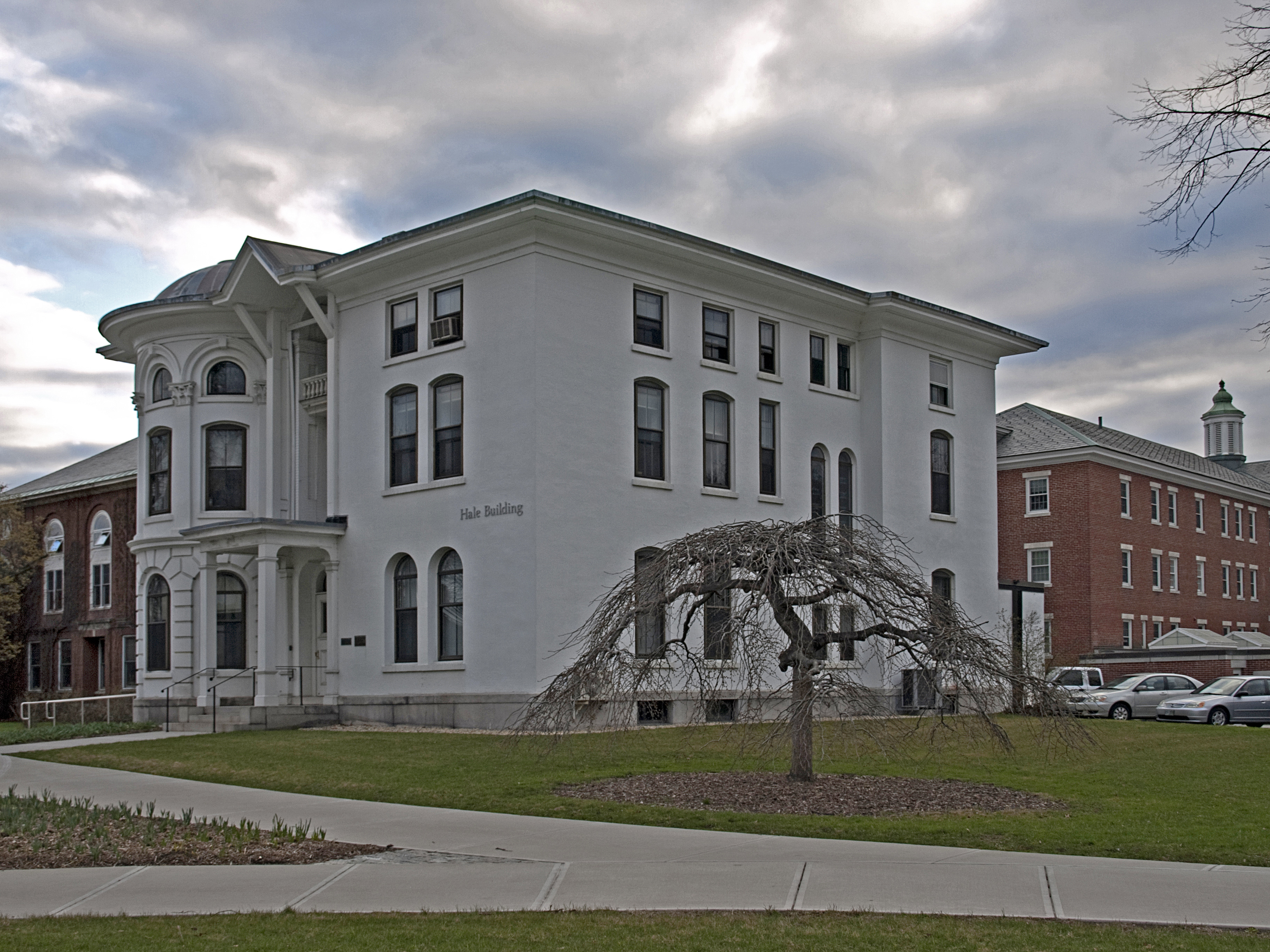

- Location within New Hampshire Location within the United States
- Location: Main and Winchester Sts., Keene, New Hampshire
- Coordinates: 42°55′39″N 72°16′40″W
- Area: 1 acre (0.40 ha)
- Built: 1860
- Built by: Buss & Woodward
- Architect: Elbridge Boyden
- Architectural style: Italianate
- NRHP reference No.: 76000197
- Added to NRHP: April 26, 1976

The Dinsmoor–Hale House is a historic house at the southwest corner of Main and Winchester Streets in Keene, New Hampshire. It was built in 1860 for Samuel Dinsmoor, Jr., a lawyer and former Governor of New Hampshire, and was later owned by Governor Samuel W. Hale, who made lavish alterations to its interior. It was acquired by what is now Keene State College in 1909. It now houses the office of the college president. The house was listed on the National Register of Historic Places in 1976.

== Description and history ==
The Dinsmoor–Hale House is located south of downtown Keene, at the southwest corner of Main and Winchester Streets on the campus of Keene State College. It is a three-story brick building, roughly square in plan, with a stuccoed exterior and a low-pitch hip roof. There is a slight projection on the south facade, where there is a stairwell, and on the main facade, where a semicircular bay rises the full three stories and is capped by a low rounded roof. The center entry is recessed from the main facade, with a recessed porch above, which is capped by a small gable.

The house was built in 1860 for Samuel Dinsmoor Jr., a prominent local lawyer and bank president who served three terms as Governor of New Hampshire in the 1850s. To design the house, Dinsmoor hired Elbridge Boyden, a noted Worcester architect. The house was reported at the time of its construction to be one of the finest in Cheshire County. Samuel W. Hale, a subsequent owner, gave the house grounds and interior a lavish upgrade, and also served as Governor in the 1880s. The house was given to the city in 1909, which in turn gave it to the state for use as part of a normal school, now Keene State College.

== See also ==
- National Register of Historic Places listings in Cheshire County, New Hampshire
