= Caleb Stark =

American politician

Senator of the New Hampshire State Senate
- In office 1818–1819

Personal details
- Born: 3 December 1759 Dunbarton, New Hampshire, USA
- Died: 28 August 1838 (aged 78) Oxford Township, Tuscarawas County, Ohio, USA
- Spouse: Sarah McKinstry
- Parent(s): Molly Stark, General John Stark
- Profession: Lawyer, historian, politician, soldier

Military service
- Branch/service: Continental Army
- Rank: Major
- Unit: 1st New Hampshire Regiment
- Battles/wars: Battle of Bunker Hill

Caleb Stark (December 3, 1759 – August 28, 1838) was an American state senator. He was the eldest son of General John Stark and his wife Molly Stark.

== Biography ==
He was born December 3, 1759, at Dunbarton, New Hampshire. During the American Revolutionary War Caleb served with his father in the 1st New Hampshire Regiment at the Battle of Bunker Hill, Trenton and Princeton as an ensign. After his father resigned his commission Caleb remained in the Continental Army, serving the rest of the war and rising to the rank of major. He served in the New Hampshire Senate from 1818 to 1819. After his service and prior to his death, he resided on the Stark Farm in Oxford Township, Tuscarawas County, Ohio on land granted to his father and brother, Lieutenant Archibald Stark. He died on August 28, 1838.

== See also ==
- New Hampshire Historical Marker No. 187: Suncook Village

== Bibliography ==
- John Stark, Freedom Fighter; by Robert P. Richmond. Waterbury, Conn. : Dale Books, 1976.
- Reminiscences of the French War; containing Rogers' Expeditions with the New-England Rangers under his command, as published in London in 1765; with notes and illustrations. : To which is added an account of the life and military services of Maj. Gen. John Stark; with notices and anecdotes of other officers distinguished in the French and Revolutionary wars.—Concord, N.H. : Published by Luther Roby., 1831.
- Frederic Kidder, History of the First New Hampshire Regiment in the War of the Revolution (Albany, 1868), 121-124;
- Robert P. Richmond, John Stark, Freedom Fighter (Waterbury, 1976);
- Luther Roby, Reminiscences of the French War; containing Rogers’ Expeditions with the New-England Rangers under his command, as published in London in 1765; with notes and illustrations. : To which is added an account of the life and military services of Maj. Gen. John Stark; with notices and anecdotes of other officers distinguished in the French and Revolutionary wars (Concord, 1831);
- Selected Wartime Service Records of Major Caleb Stark.
