= Keene State College =

Public college in Keene, New Hampshire, US

- Former names: Keene Normal School (1909–1939); Keene Teachers College (1939–1963)
- Motto: Enter to learn; go forth to serve
- Type: Public liberal arts college
- Established: 1909
- Parent institution: University System of New Hampshire
- Affiliations: Council of Public Liberal Arts Colleges
- President: Donald Birx (interim)
- Provost: James Beeby
- Students: 2,867 (Fall 2024)
- Undergraduates: 2,744 (Fall 2024)
- Postgraduates: 123 (Fall 2024)
- Location: Keene, New Hampshire, United States; 42°55′40″N 72°16′43″W
- Campus: 170 acres (69 ha); Urban/Rural
- Colors: Red and White
- Nickname: Owls
- Sporting affiliations: NCAA Division III; Little East Conference
- Mascot: Hootie the Owl
- Website: keene.edu
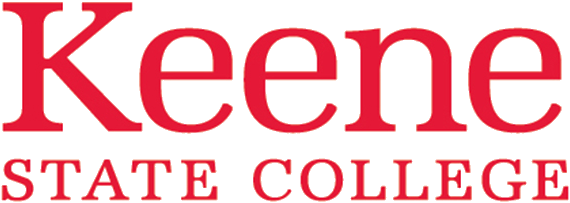

Keene State College is a public liberal arts college in Keene, New Hampshire. It is part of the University System of New Hampshire. It was founded in 1909 as a Normal School, and then as a Teachers College.

== Academics ==
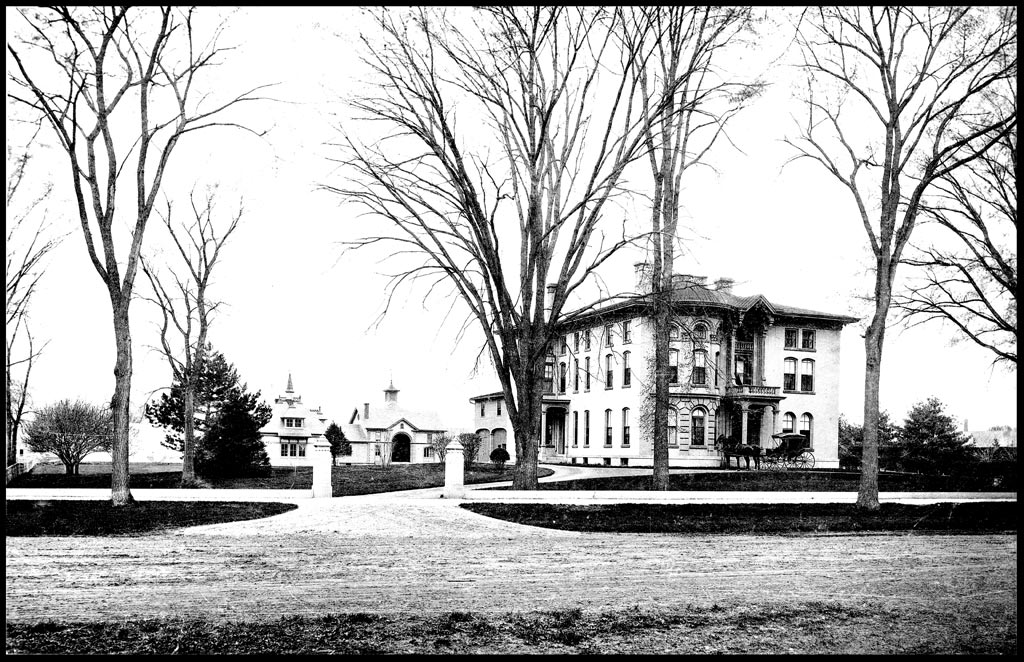
Hale House, sometime before 1886

Some of the largest academic programs at Keene State College are Education, Business Management/Management, Psychology, Safety & Occupational Health Applied Sciences, and Criminal Justice Studies, according to the declared majors reported in the Keene State College Factbook.

Keene State College offers more than 40 areas of undergraduate study in the liberal arts, social sciences, sciences, and professional programs, as well as selected graduate degrees. Both the Master of Science in Safety & Occupational Health Applied Sciences and Master of Science in Public Health Nutrition are offered as fully online programs. Other notable majors include Construction Safety Sciences, Sustainability Studies, Construction Management, Neuroscience, and Nursing. Keene's Factbook 2019-2020 shows that Exercise Science and Criminal Justice Studies are some of the fastest growing majors.

The Safety & Occupational Health Applied Sciences program is the second largest major on campus. This program began holding an annual professional development conference in conjunction with the student ASSE (American Society of Safety Engineers) chapter.

Keene State College is also the first accredited university in the nation to offer a four-year undergraduate degree in Holocaust and Genocide Studies.

=== Reputation and rankings ===
Keene State College was ranked by U.S. News & World Report as #9 in Best Schools, #5 in Best Undergraduate Teaching, #7 in Top Public Schools, #4 in Best Colleges for Veterans and #10 in Best Value Schools in its region.

The Princeton Review's "2022 Best Colleges: Region by Region" Keene State College was named one of the Best Regional Colleges in the Northeast.

Keene State is one of 224 select colleges and universities in the Northeast that The Princeton Review profiled in its 2006 edition of The Best Northeastern Colleges. The most popular majors are Safety & Occupational Health Applied Sciences, Education, and Psychology.

In 2024, Washington Monthly ranked Keene State 34th among 223 colleges that award almost exclusively bachelor's degrees in the U.S. based on its contribution to the public good, as measured by social mobility, research, and promoting public service.

== Facilities ==
=== Alumni Center ===
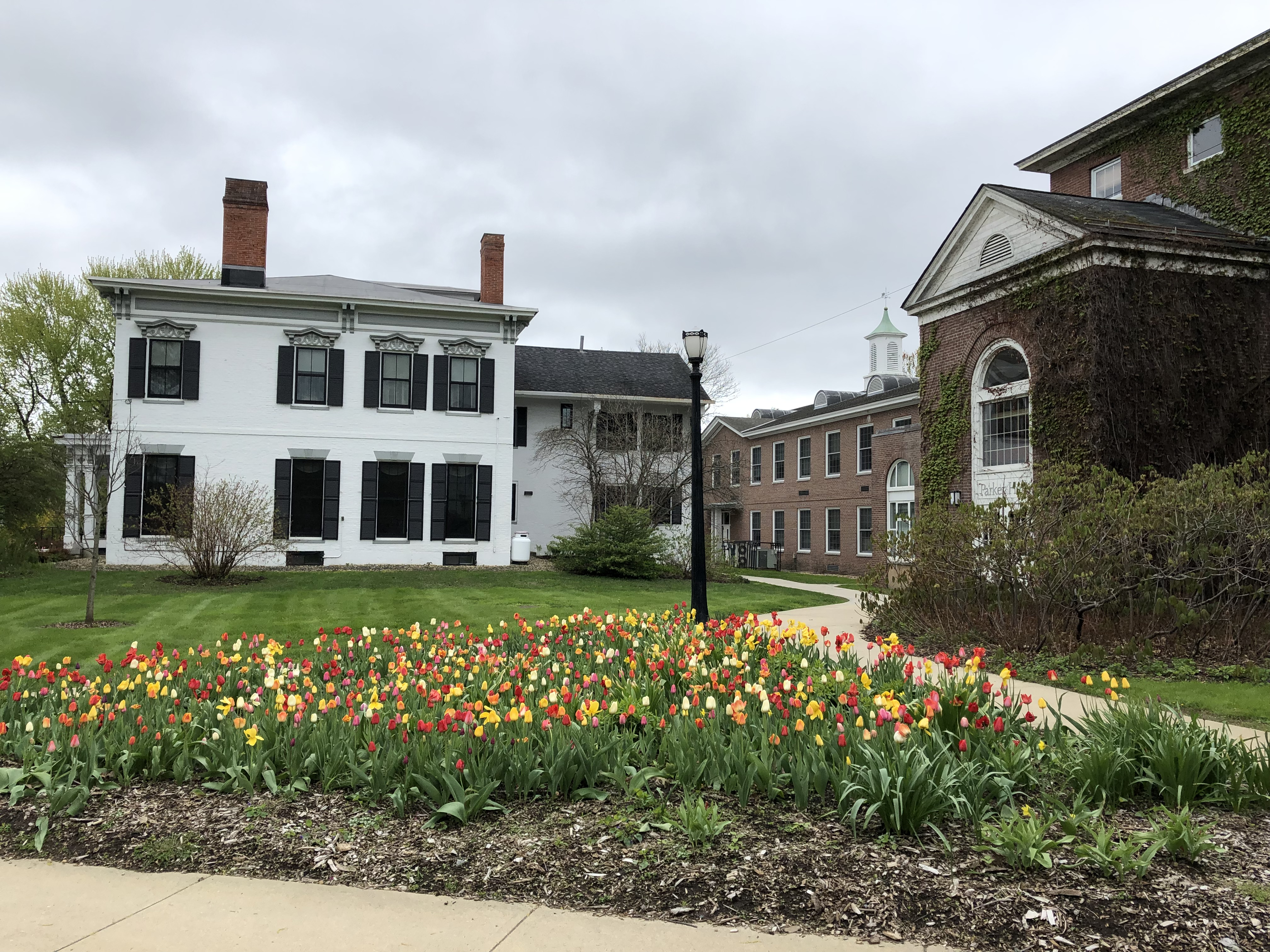
Keene State College campus, left to right: President's House, Morrison Hall, Parker Hall

Opened in 2010 and houses the College Advancement Division: Alumni & Constituent Relations, Development, and Marketing & Communications. This building is designed to accommodate reunion banquets, class meetings, job fairs, and other campus and community events.

=== The Commons ===
A first-year residence hall that houses 11 Living and Learning Communities (LLCs).

=== Elliot Hall ===
Elliot Center is home to on-campus services, including Admissions, the Financial Aid office, Student Accounts office, Academic & Career Advising, the Registrar's office, Health Services, and Transitions & Parent Programs. The Education Department's Child Development Center is located within this facility.

=== Fiske Hall ===
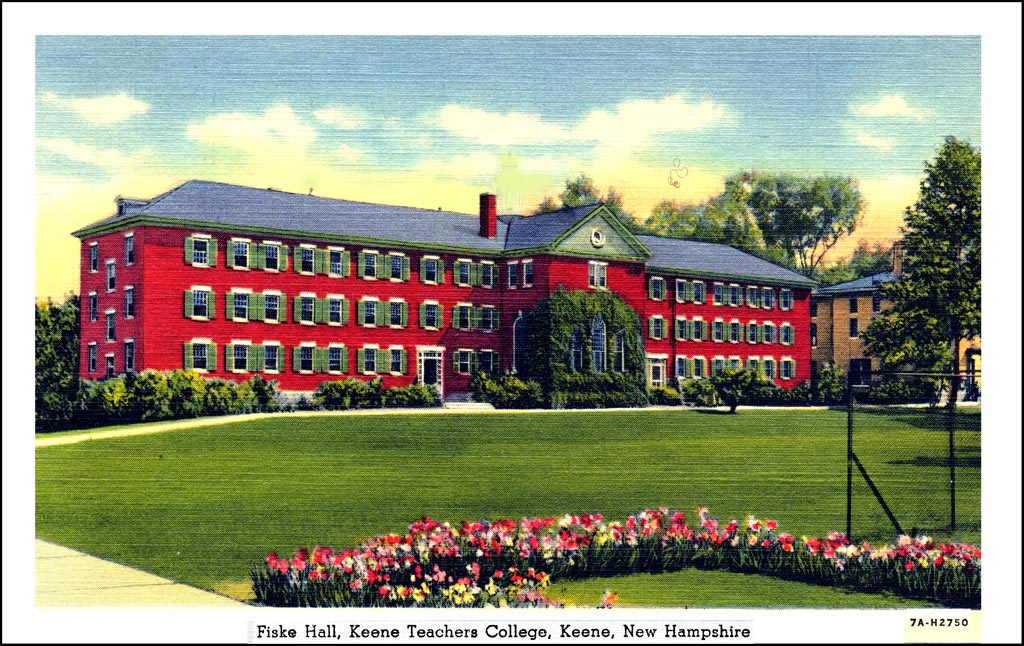
Fiske Hall

The oldest building on the campus, Fiske Hall has been a part of the college since its founding in 1909. It underwent renovations during the spring semester of 2007 following the opening of new residence halls elsewhere on campus, and reopened for the Fall 2007 semester. The Annex houses the college's Budgeting office, Purchasing office, and Human Resources office.

=== Hale Building ===
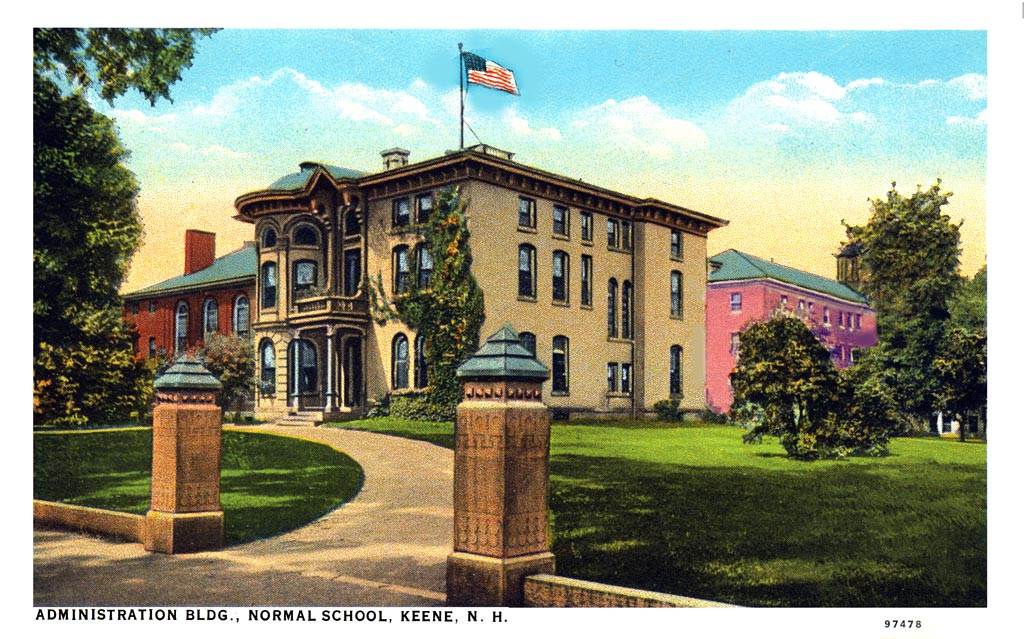
Hale Building

The Hale Building was constructed in 1861 and was the home of several New Hampshire governors. Hale now houses the offices of the College President, the Provost/VP for Academic Affairs, the Chief Diversity Officer, and other principal administrators.

=== Holloway Hall ===
A second-year residence hall that consists of three co-ed floors with a kitchen on each one. Each suite consists of two main rooms with a shared bathroom located between them. Each room houses two or three residents, totaling up to 5 people per suite. Floors are broken up into parliaments by a common interest. There is a great hall with a piano, pingpong table, pool table, and a fireplace.

=== Huntress Hall ===
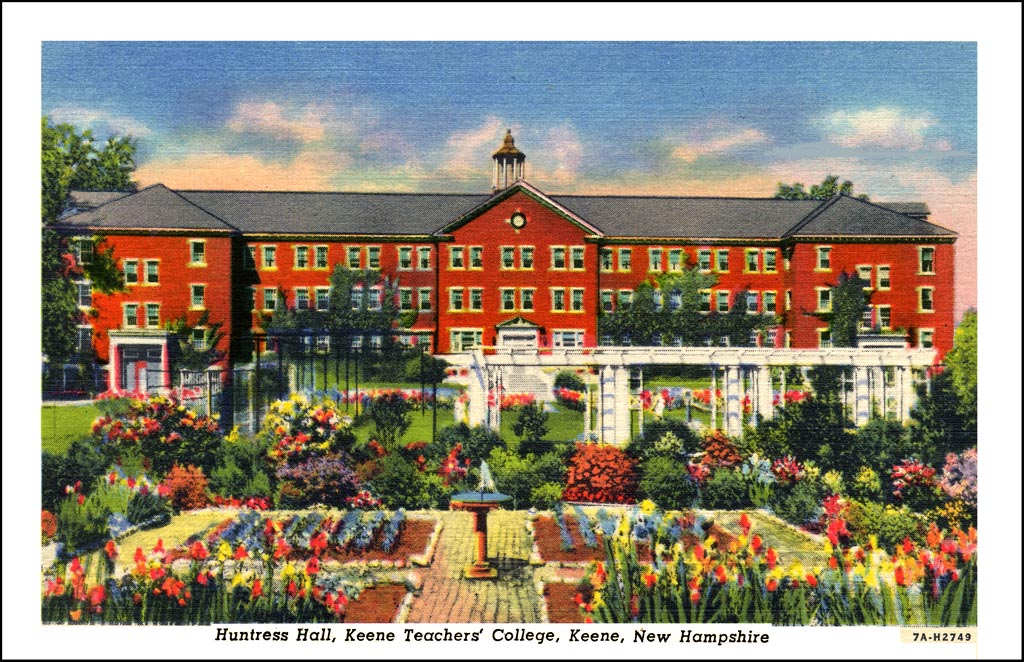
Huntress Hall

A co-ed residence hall (formerly a girls-only hall) situated on the main quad. It is one of the oldest dorms on campus and is rumored to be haunted by the ghost of its namesake, Harriet Lane Huntress, a former administrator in the New Hampshire Department of Education. The ghost was briefly mentioned on a show on the Travel Channel.

=== Media Arts Center ===
The Media Arts Center opened in the fall of 2006. It contains offices, classroom space, and lab space for the Film, Graphic Design, Communications, and Journalism departments. It was constructed in the former Zorn dining commons building following the completion of the New Zorn Dining Commons.

=== Mason Library ===
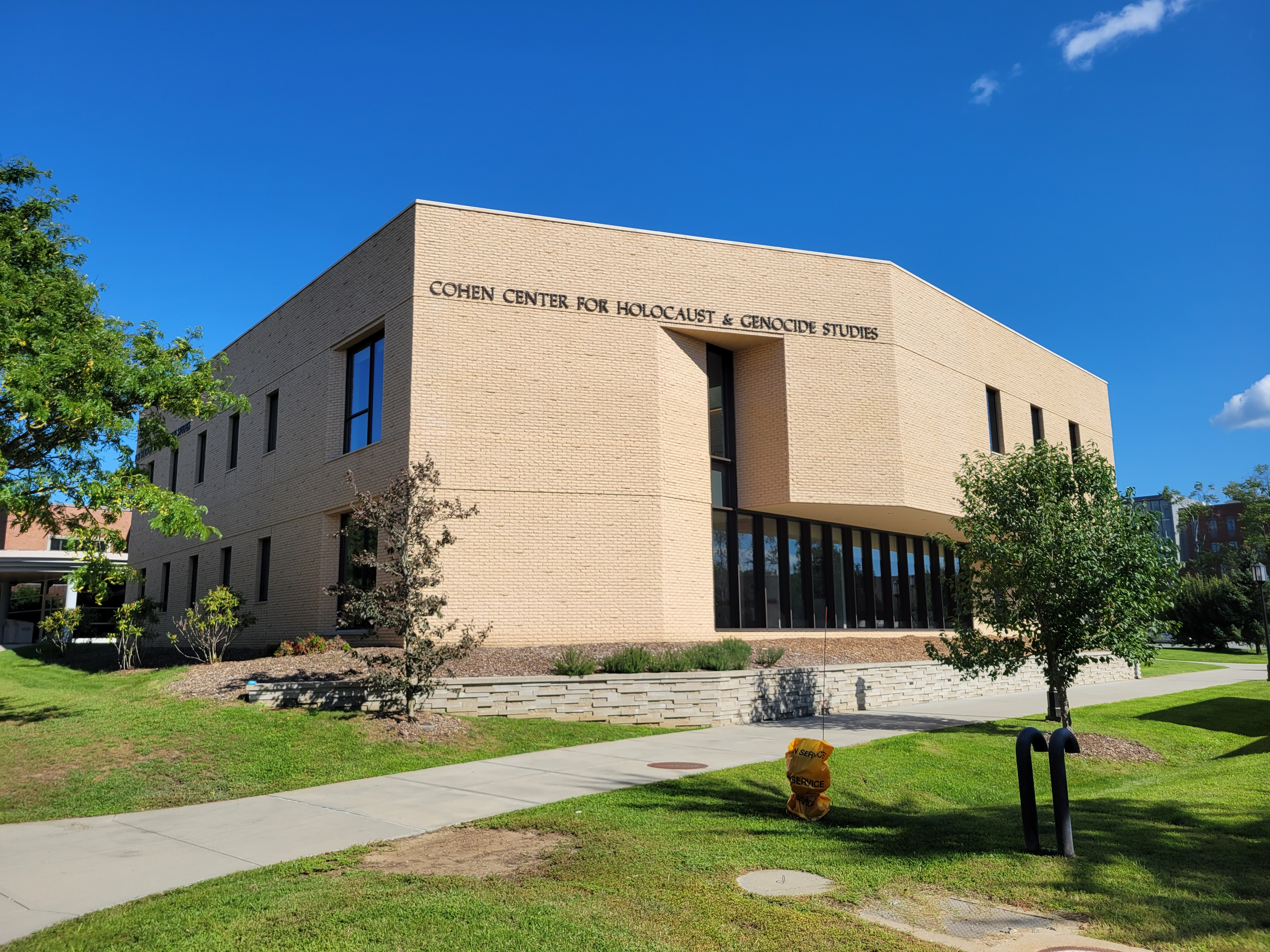
Cohen Center

The Mason Library is home to the Cohen Center for Holocaust and Genocide Studies. This facility also houses KSC's reference collection, as well as a periodicals collection, a newspaper archive, and a video and DVD collection, which is surpassed by the collection held by the film department in the Media Arts Center.

The library is named for Wallace Edward Mason, who was the President of Keene Normal School from 1911 until 1939. In 2018, a new wing of the building was opened which includes an expanded Cohen Center for Holocaust and Genocide Studies.

In Fall 2021, the Center for Research & Writing moved from its original location on 81 Blake Street into a larger dedicated space in the Mason Library, offering peer tutoring services in speaking, researching, and writing processes.

=== Pondside II ===
Pondside II houses 120 co-ed residents - all juniors and seniors - in four-person, carpeted apartments. Each apartment consists of four single bedrooms, a shared bathroom, living area, and a kitchen equipped with a stove, oven, microwave, and refrigerator. Overhead lighting is provided in each bedroom and common area. Students who live in this area are responsible for cleaning and supplying their bathrooms.

=== Putnam Science Center ===
The David F. Putnam Science Center was recently renovated and is home to the Computer Science department and other major science fields. The KSC Science Center includes several Windows computer labs. These lab devices run ArcGIS, Apache NetBeans, and other specialized software that students have access to.

=== Redfern Arts Center ===
The Redfern Arts Center on Brickyard Pond is home to the performing arts and visual arts on campus. It has three performance venues: the Alumni Recital Hall, home to musical performances and the annual KSC Film Festival; the Main Theatre, which hosts touring performances and college productions and can seat 572; and the Wright Theatre (formerly the Studio Theatre), which was named after Ruth McCaffery Wright '29, and dedicated in May 1995. The Wright Theatre is a flexible black box theatre, allowing for a variety of theatre configurations. It is used primarily by the Theatre and Dance Department as a performance space and classroom. The building also houses fine arts classes including painting, drawing, sculpture and printmaking.

=== Spaulding Gymnasium ===
The Spaulding Gymnasium and Recreation Center is open to all KSC students and faculty free of charge, and to the general public for a fee. In addition to the large main gym, it includes a pool, a suspended track, a weight room, and an aerobics room. Spaulding houses the Exercise Science and Athletic Training majors.

=== TDS Center ===
This building is used for the architecture department as well as the product design students. It also houses the Safety & Occupational Health Applied Sciences program - the increase in number of students majoring in the Safety & Occupational Health Applied Sciences program has allowed it to grow into a Master's program.

=== Young Student Center ===
The Young Student Center was named for Lloyd P. Young, who served as the school's president from 1939 to 1964. It is one of the tallest buildings on campus and is home to the campus bookstore, several food vendors, the campus mailroom, the Mabel Brown auditorium, student organization offices, and WKNH, the college's student-run radio station.

== Student life ==
Undergraduate demographics as of Fall 2023
Race and ethnicity	Total
White	85%
Hispanic	5%
Two or more races	3%
Unknown	3%
Black	2%
Asian	1%
Economic diversity
Low-income (Note: The percentage of students who received an income-based federal Pell grant intended for low-income students.)	25%
Affluent (Note: The percentage of students who are a part of the American middle class at the bare minimum.)	75%

=== Athletics ===
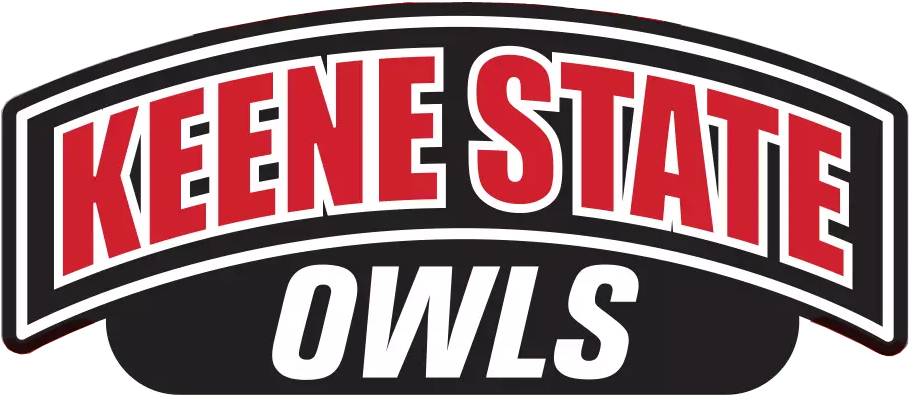
Keene State Owls mark

Keene State, known athletically as the Owls, is an NCAA Division III school, competing in the Little East Conference. Their mascot is Hootie the Owl, and their colors are red and white.

Current programs include cross-country (men's and women's), basketball (men's and women's), soccer (men's and women's), volleyball, field hockey, baseball, softball, track (indoor and outdoor, men's and women's), lacrosse (men's and women's), swimming and diving (men's and women's), ice hockey (men's and women's), and cheerleading. In 2023, Keene State introduced a varsity esports team. The college also offers many club sports: men's soccer, men's and women's rugby, men's and women's ice hockey, ultimate, Brazilian Jiu-Jitsu, dance team, environmental outing, ski and snowboard, and yoga.

Keene State's softball team appeared in the Women's College World Series in 1972. The men's cross-country team was the NCAA Division III national runner-up in 1999 and 2000. The men's basketball team won the Eastern College Athletic Conference men's basketball tournament in 2026.

=== Greek life ===
==== Governing boards ====
- Interfraternity Council
- Panhellenic Council

==== Fraternities ====
- Alpha Sigma Phi (ΑΣΦ)
- Delta Tau Delta (ΔΤΔ)
- Sigma Pi (ΣΠ)

==== Sororities ====
- Delta Phi Epsilon (ΔΦΕ)
- Phi Sigma Sigma (ΦΣΣ) (formerly Phi Sigma Beta (ΦΣΒ))

== Notable alumni ==
- Jim Ferry (Class of 1990), head basketball coach, University of Maryland, Baltimore County (UMBC), 2021–present
- Fritz Wetherbee (Class of 1963), television host and journalist; "The Voice of New Hampshire"
