= Molly Stark =

American Revolutionary War figure

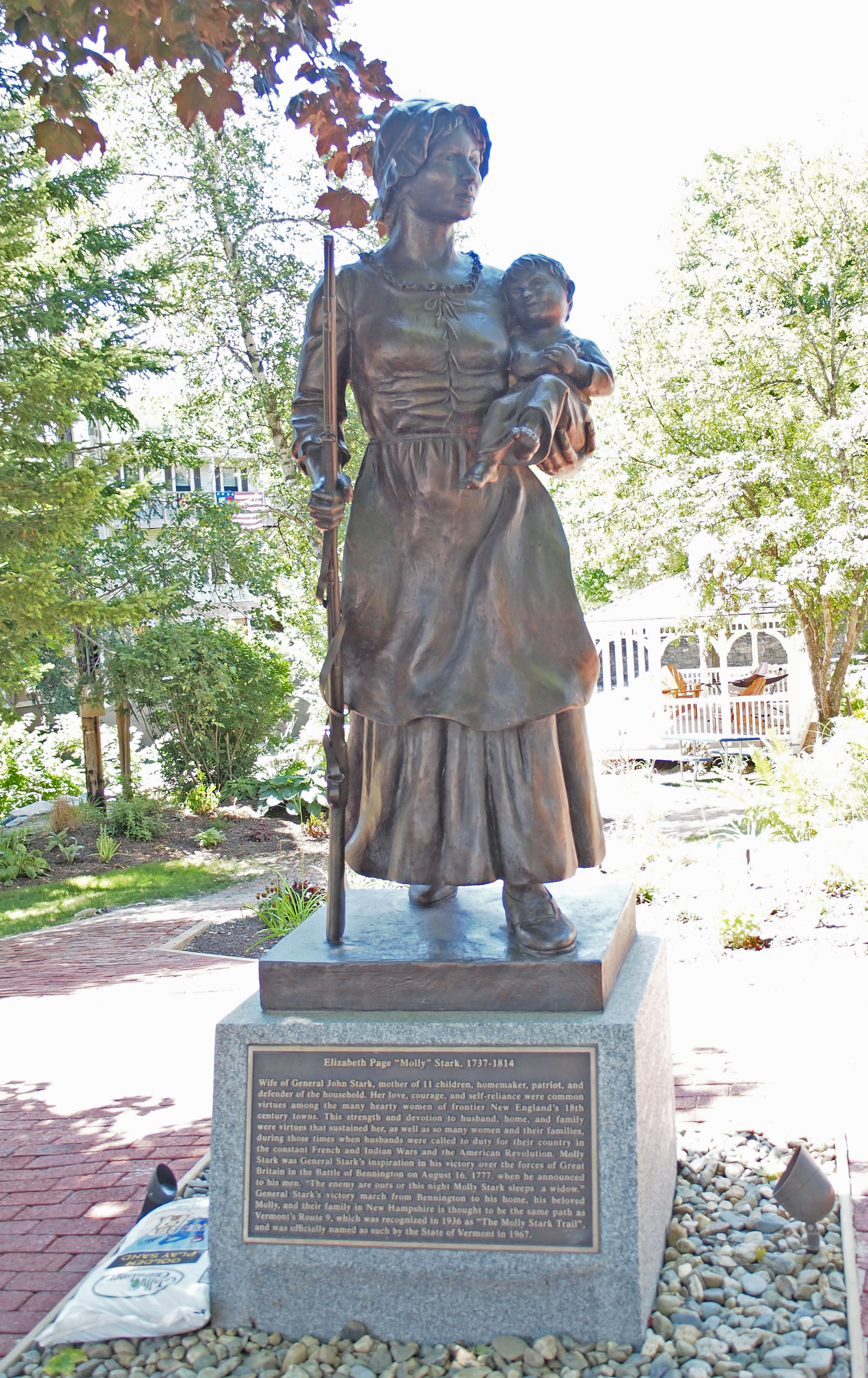
- Statue of Molly Stark in Wilmington, Vermont
- Born: Elizabeth Page; February 16, 1737; Haverhill, Massachusetts
- Died: June 29, 1814 (aged 77)
- Resting place: Manchester, New Hampshire
- Spouse: General John Stark (m. 1758)
- Children: 11, including Caleb Stark
- Relatives: Harriet Lane Huntress

Molly Stark House
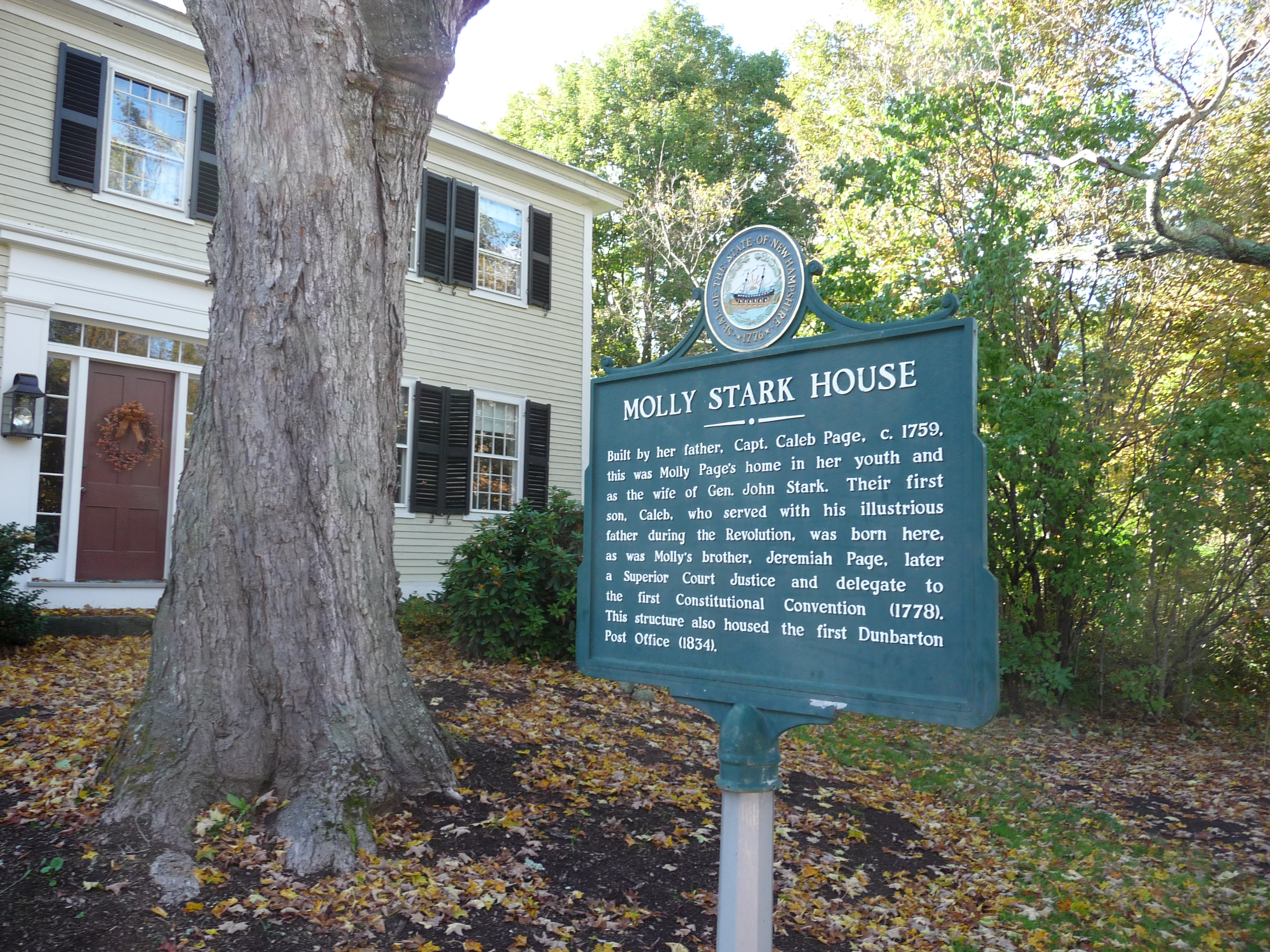
- Location: 346 Stark Highway North, Dunbarton, New Hampshire
- Coordinates: 43.14930°N 71.63013°W
- Built: c. 1759

NH State Register of Historic Places
- Designated: January 27, 2003

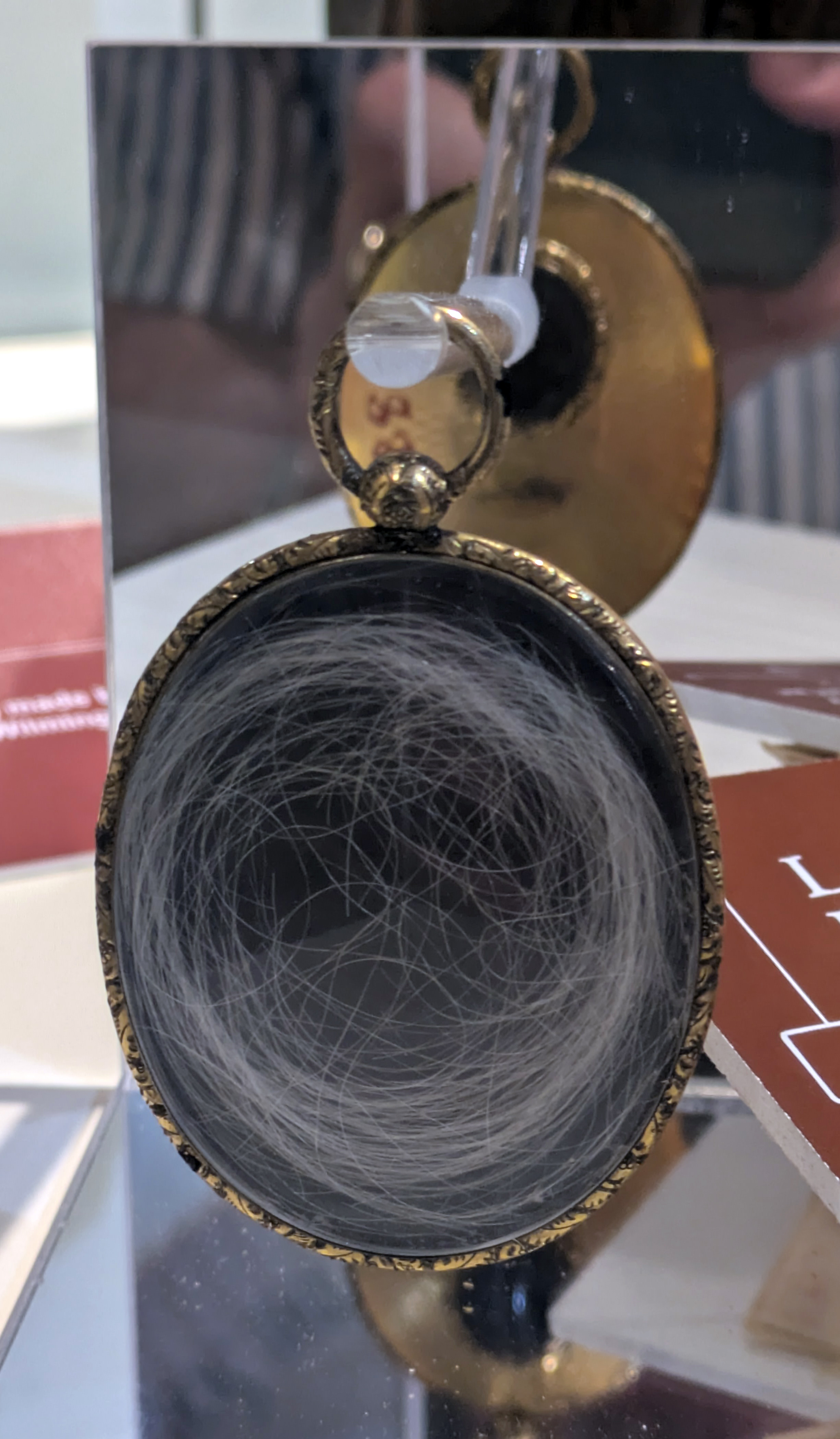
Locket with a lock of Molly Stark's hair (Manchester Historic Association)

Molly Stark, née Elizabeth Page (February 16, 1737 – June 29, 1814) was the wife of General John Stark, made famous by his battle cry during the American Revolutionary War. Described as "mother of 11 children, homemaker, patriot, and defender of the household", there are locations and landmarks named for her in at least four states.

== Biography ==
Elizabeth Page was born in Haverhill, Massachusetts, on February 16, 1737, (Note: Haverhill vital records list "Elisabeth Page" with a birth date of "Feb. 16, 1737-8"; see Dual dating.) to Caleb Page and Elizabeth Merrill. Her father was "a successful merchant, militia captain, and surveyor." Her mother died when she was five, and she was adopted by Ruth Wallingford, widow her uncle Nathaniel Merrill, with 10 children of her own. She spent 10 years with the Wallingfords, then returned to live with her father in Starkstown (current Dunbarton, New Hampshire) in 1752 at the age of 15. Her father owned slaves, which was not common in New Hampshire. She married John Stark on August 20, 1758; it was apparently John Stark who gave his wife the nickname of "Molly". Together they had 11 children, including their eldest son, Caleb Stark.

Molly Stark is remembered for her husband's battle call of "There are your enemies, the Red Coats and the Tories. They are ours, or this night Molly Stark sleeps a widow!" before engaging with the British and Hessian army in the Battle of Bennington. (Note: Variants of General Stark's battle cry include "There boys are our enemies; to-night they must be ours or Mollie Stark's a widow" and "Tonight the American flag floats from yonder hill, or Molly Stark sleeps a widow".) Stark is also known for her success as a nurse to her husband's troops during a smallpox epidemic and for opening their home as a hospital during the war. (Note: Possibly apocryphal, as sourcing dates this event to the Battle of Carillon (1758 Battle of Ticonderoga) which took place a month before the Starks were married.) In late November 1778, she petitioned the New Hampshire Court "praying for leave to inoculate herself and family for the Small Pox," but her request was denied by authorities who feared it could spread the disease. She died on June 29, 1814, and was interred in Manchester, New Hampshire.

=== Vermont ===
Stark is honored in Vermont by the Molly Stark State Park in Wilmington, and a statue of Stark holding a child and musket in downtown Wilmington near the Deerfield River. Also named for her is the Molly Stark Trail, otherwise known as Route 9, which crosses southern Vermont and commemorates the route used by General Stark on his victory march home from the Battle of Bennington. There is also a Molly Stark Elementary School in Bennington. Molly Stark Mountain is one of the Green Mountain peaks on the Long Trail, just south of Camel's Hump and north of Route 17; the adjacent peak is Baby Stark.

=== New Hampshire ===
The Molly Stark House still stands in Dunbarton at Page's Corner, denoted by a New Hampshire historical marker (number 111); it was added to the New Hampshire State Register of Historic Places in 2003. The Molly Stark cannon, or "Old Molly", bears her name, and is kept by the New Boston Artillery Company, denoted by a New Hampshire historical marker (number 146). The Molly Stark Chapter of the Daughters of the American Revolution is located in Manchester.

=== Ohio ===
Numerous revolutionary war veterans settled in Ohio, so the General and his wife were honored there. Molly Stark Park is located in Nimishillen Township, Stark County, in northeastern Ohio. It is the grounds of the former Molly Stark Hospital, which served as a tuberculosis sanatorium between 1929 and 1956 and as a general hospital and geriatric facility until 1995. In 2008, the county park board offered to buy the hospital and its grounds for a dollar, and the county opened the first public park in the township in April 2009. The hospital was demolished in 2025.

=== Minnesota ===
Molly Stark Lake in Otter Tail County, Minnesota, is named for her.
