= Starkville, Georgia =

Ghost town in Lee County, Georgia, U.S.A

Coordinates: 31°46′20″N 84°08′44″W

Starkville, or Starksville, is a ghost town in Lee County, Georgia. The town is named for American Revolution war hero John Stark.

== History ==
Starkville was founded in 1832 as the county seat of Lee county. By 1837 a courthouse had been erected and by 1840 a jail was built. In 1856 the courthouse burned and the county seat was moved to Webster but returned in 1858. In 1832 Starkville Academy was formed to educate the young people of the town. The Georgia General Assembly incorporated Starville as a town in 1839.

In 1872 the county seat was moved to Wooten Station (now known as Leesburg) and the population of Starkville dwindled away. In 1916, five African American men who had been taken from a jail in Worth County were lynched by a mob. The town's municipal charter was not officially repealed until 1995. Little remains of the original community. A cemetery marks the site.
