= John Stark =

American general (1728–1822)

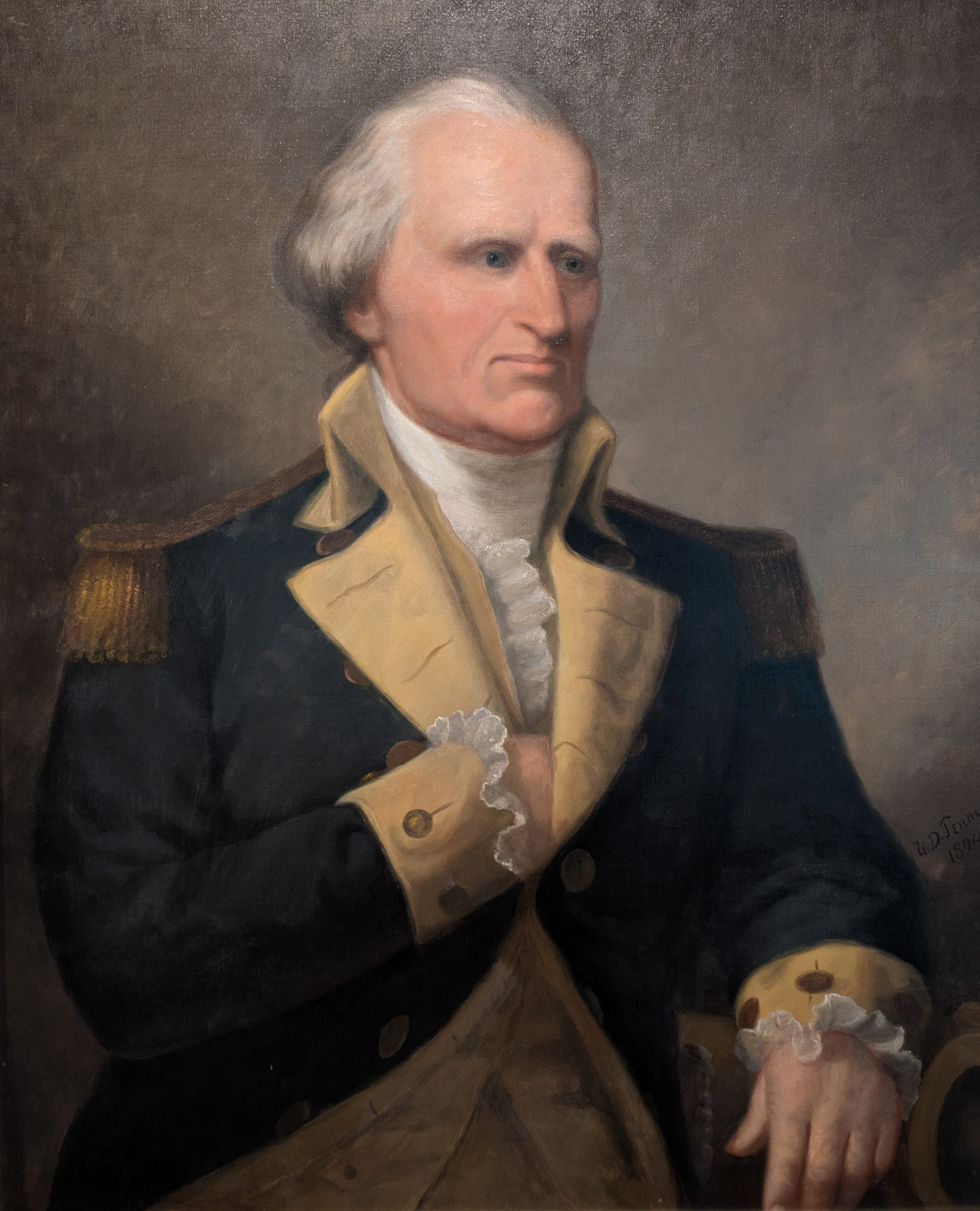
- Portrait by Ulysses Dow Tenney, c. 1790
- Born: August 28, 1728; Londonderry, Province of New Hampshire, British America
- Died: May 8, 1822 (aged 93); Manchester, New Hampshire, U.S.
- Burial place: Stark Cemetery, Manchester; 43.01420°N 71.47095°W
- Spouse: Molly Stark (m. 1758)
- Children: 11, including Caleb Stark
- Military career
- Allegiance: New Hampshire; United States
- Branch: New Hampshire Provincial Forces; New Hampshire Militia; Continental Army
- Service years: 1754-1759 (New Hampshire); 1775–1783 (United States)
- Rank: Major general
- Nickname: The Hero of Bennington
- Units: Rogers' Rangers; 1st New Hampshire Regiment
- Commands: Northern Department
- Conflicts: French and Indian War; Battle on Snowshoes (1757); Battle of Carillon; American Revolutionary War; Siege of Boston; Battle of Bunker Hill; Invasion of Canada (1775); Battle of Trenton; Battle of Princeton; Battle of Bennington; Battle of Springfield

John Stark (August 28, 1728 – May 8, 1822) was an American military officer who served during the French and Indian War and the Revolutionary War. A major general, he became known as the "Hero of Bennington" for his exemplary service at the Battle of Bennington in 1777.

== Early life ==
John Stark was born in Londonderry, New Hampshire (at a site that is now in Derry) in 1728. His father, Archibald Stark (1693–1758) was born in Glasgow, Scotland, to parents who were from Wiltshire, England; Stark's father met his future wife when he moved to Londonderry in Ireland. When Stark was eight years old, his family moved to Derryfield (now Manchester, New Hampshire), where he lived for the rest of his life. Stark married Elizabeth "Molly" Page, with whom he had 11 children including eldest son Major Caleb Stark and son Lieutenant Archibald Stark, who both served in the military.

On April 28, 1752, while on a hunting and trapping trip along the Baker River, a tributary of the Pemigewasset River, he was captured by Abenaki warriors and brought back to Canada but not before warning his brother William to paddle away in his canoe, though neighbor David Stinson was killed. While a prisoner of the Abenaki, he and his fellow prisoner Amos Eastman were made to run a gauntlet of warriors armed with sticks. Stark grabbed the stick from the first warrior's hands and proceeded to attack him, taking the rest of the warriors by surprise. The chief was so impressed by this heroic act that Stark was adopted into the tribe, where he spent the winter.

The following spring a government agent sent from the Province of Massachusetts Bay to work on the exchange of prisoners paid his ransom of $103 Spanish dollars and $60 for Amos Eastman. Stark and Eastman then returned to New Hampshire safely.

== French and Indian War ==
Stark served as a second lieutenant under Major Robert Rogers during the French and Indian War. His brother William Stark served beside him. As a member of the daring Rogers' Rangers, Stark gained valuable combat experience and a detailed knowledge of the northern frontier of the American colonies. While serving with the rangers in 1757, Stark went on a scouting mission toward Fort Carillon in which the rangers were ambushed.

General Jeffery Amherst, in 1759 ordered Rogers' Rangers to journey from Lake George to the Abenaki village of St. Francis, deep in Quebec. The Rangers went north and attacked the Indian town. Stark, Rogers' second-in-command of all ranger companies, refused to accompany the attacking force out of respect for his Indian foster-parents residing there. He returned to New Hampshire to his wife, whom he had married the previous year.

At the end of the war, Stark retired as a captain and returned to Derryfield, New Hampshire. His time with the Rangers taught him tactics that he would put to good use during the revolution.

== American Revolution ==
Replica of a flag, often claimed to be that of the Green Mountain Boys, in John Stark's collection.

=== Bunker Hill ===
The Battles of Lexington and Concord on April 19, 1775, signaled the start of the American Revolutionary War, and Stark returned to military service. On April 23, 1775, Stark accepted a colonelcy in the New Hampshire Militia and was given command of the 1st New Hampshire Regiment; James Reed of the 3rd New Hampshire Regiment, also outside of Boston. As soon as Stark could muster his men, he ferried and marched them south to Boston to support the blockaded rebels there. He made his headquarters in the confiscated Isaac Royall House in Medford, Massachusetts.

On June 16, the rebels, fearing a preemptive British attack on their positions in Cambridge and Roxbury, decided to take and hold Breed's Hill, a high point on the Charlestown peninsula near Boston. On the night of the 16th, American troops moved into position on the heights and began digging entrenchments.

As dawn approached, lookouts on HMS Lively, a 20-gun sloop of war, noticed the activity and the sloop opened fire on the rebels and the works in progress. This in turn drew the attention of the British admiral, who demanded to know what the Lively was shooting at. Subsequently, the entire British squadron opened fire. As dawn broke on June 17 the British could clearly see hastily constructed fortifications on Breed's Hill; British General Thomas Gage knew that he would have to drive the rebels out before fortifications were complete. He ordered Major General William Howe to prepare to land his troops. Thus began the Battle of Bunker Hill. American Colonel William Prescott held the hill throughout the intense initial bombardment with only a few hundred American militia. Prescott knew that he was sorely outgunned and outnumbered, so he sent a desperate request for reinforcements.

Stark and Reed with the New Hampshire minutemen arrived at the scene soon after Prescott's request. The Lively had begun a rain of accurate artillery fire directed at Charlestown Neck, the narrow strip of land connecting Charlestown to the rebel positions. On the Charlestown side, several companies from other regiments were milling around in disarray, afraid to march into range of the artillery fire. Stark ordered the men to stand aside and calmly marched his men to Prescott's positions without taking any casualties.

When the New Hampshire militia arrived, the grateful Colonel Prescott allowed Stark to deploy his men where he saw fit. Stark surveyed the ground and immediately saw that the British would probably try to flank the rebels by landing on the beach of the Mystic River, below and to the left of Bunker Hill. Stark led his men to the low ground between Mystic Beach and the hill and ordered them to "fortify" a two-rail fence by stuffing straw and grass between the rails. Stark also noticed an additional gap in the defense line and ordered Lieutenant Nathaniel Hutchins from his brother William's company and others to follow him down a 9-foot-high (2.7 m) bank to the edge of the Mystic River. They piled rocks across the 12-foot-wide (3.7 m) beach to form a crude defense line. After this fortification was hastily constructed, Stark deployed his men three-deep behind the wall. A large contingent of British with the Royal Welch Fusiliers in the lead advanced towards the fortifications. The Minutemen crouched and waited until the advancing British were almost on top of them, and then stood up and fired as one. They unleashed a fierce and unexpected volley directly into the faces of the fusiliers, killing 90 in the blink of an eye and breaking their advance. The fusiliers retreated in panic. A charge of British infantry was next, climbing over their dead comrades to test Stark's line. This charge too was decimated by a withering fusillade by the Minutemen. A third charge was repulsed in a similar fashion, again with heavy losses to the British. The British officers wisely withdrew their men from that landing point and decided to land elsewhere, with the support of artillery.

Later in the battle, as the rebels were forced from the hill, Stark directed the New Hampshire regiment's fire to provide cover for Colonel Prescott's retreating troops. The day's New Hampshire dead were later buried in the Salem Street Burying Ground, Medford, Massachusetts.

While the British did eventually take the hill that day, their losses were formidable, especially among the officers. After the arrival of General George Washington two weeks after the battle, the siege reached a stalemate until March the next year, when cannons seized at the Capture of Fort Ticonderoga were positioned on Dorchester Heights in a deft night maneuver. This placement threatened the British fleet in Boston Harbor and forced General Howe to withdraw all his forces from the Boston garrison and sail for Halifax, Nova Scotia.

Among the notable men who served under Stark was Captain Henry Dearborn, who later became Secretary of War under President Thomas Jefferson. Dearborn arrived with 60 militiamen from New Hampshire.

=== Trenton and Princeton ===
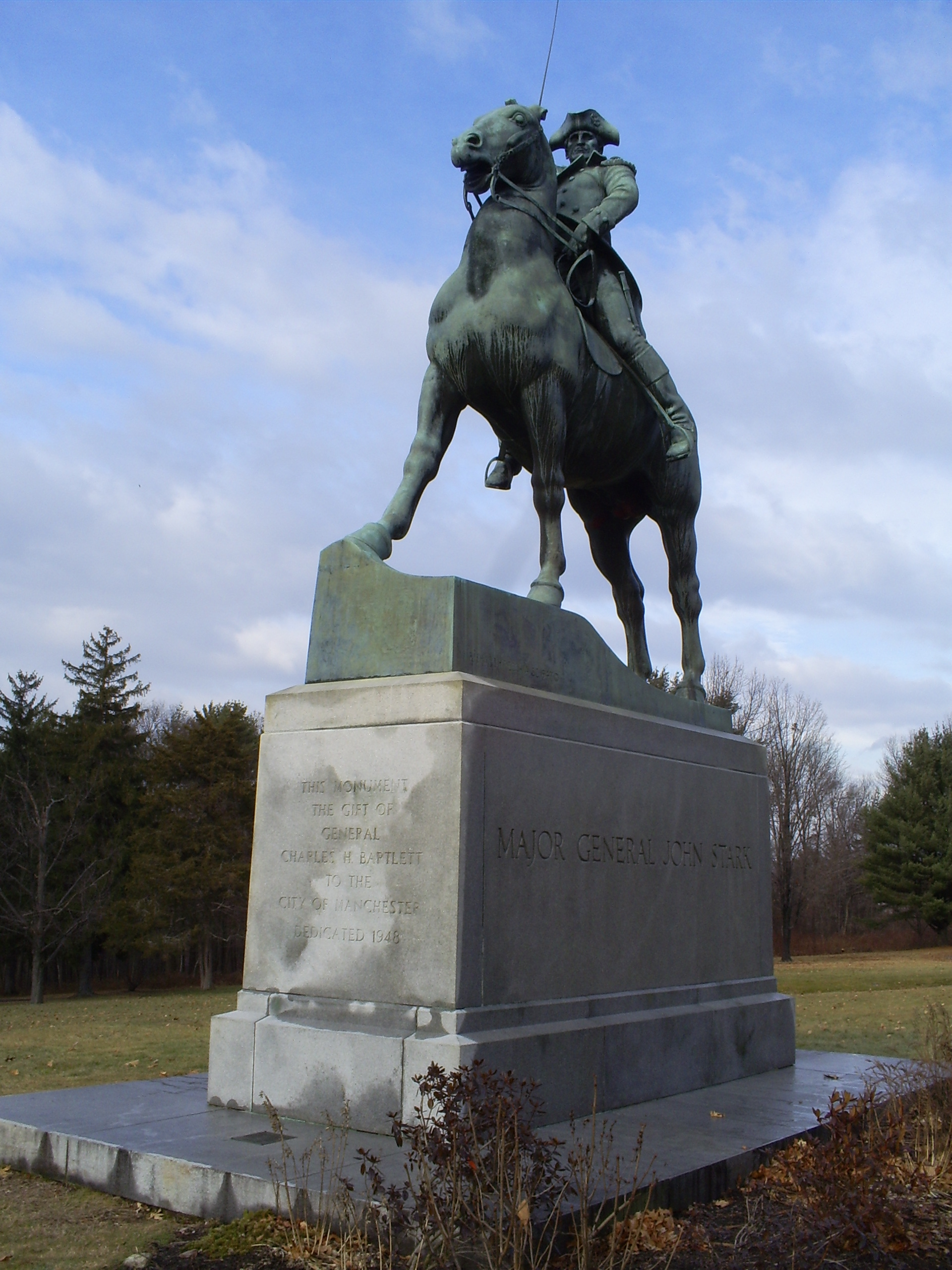
Statue at Stark Park in Manchester, New Hampshire

As Washington prepared to go to New York in anticipation of a British attack there, he knew that he desperately needed experienced men like John Stark to command regiments in the Continental Army. George Washington immediately offered Stark a command in the Continental Army. Stark and his New Hampshire regiment agreed to attach themselves to the Continental Army. The men of the New Hampshire Line were sent as reinforcements to the Continental Army during the Invasion of Canada in the spring of 1776. After the retreat of the Continental Army from Canada, Stark and his men traveled to New Jersey to join Washington's main army. They were with Washington in the battles of Princeton and Trenton in late 1776 and early 1777.

After Trenton, Washington asked Stark to return to New Hampshire to recruit more men for the Continental Army. Stark agreed, but upon returning home, learned that while he had been fighting in New Jersey, a fellow New Hampshire Colonel named Enoch Poor had been promoted to Brigadier General in the Continental Army. In Stark's opinion, Poor had refused to march his militia regiment to Bunker Hill to join the battle, instead choosing to keep his regiment at home. Stark, an experienced woodsman and fighting commander, had been passed over for someone with no combat experience and apparently no will to fight. On March 23, 1777, Stark resigned his commission in disgust, although he pledged his future aid to New Hampshire if it should be needed.

=== Bennington and beyond ===
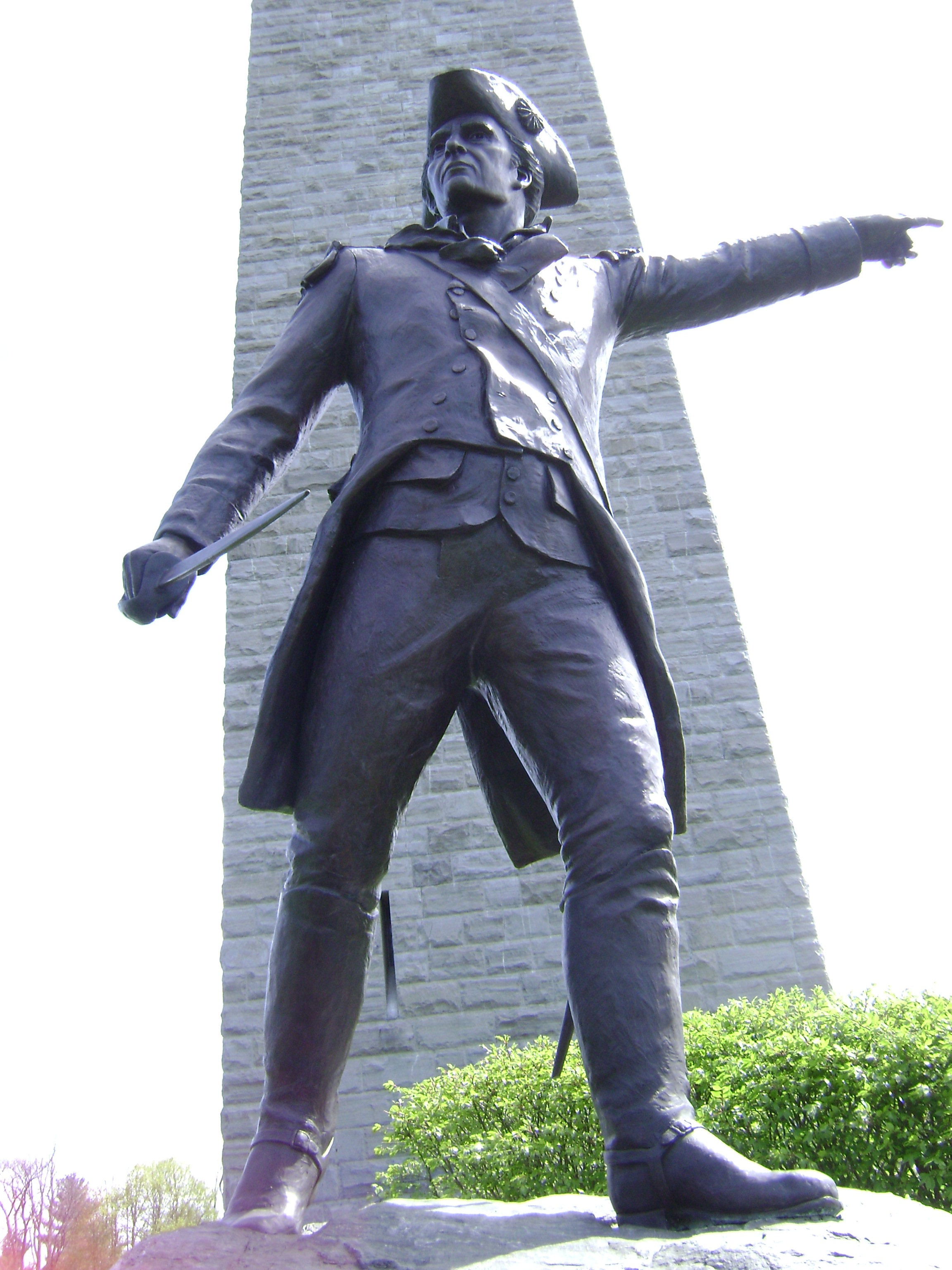
General Stark's statue at the Bennington Battle Monument

Four months later, his home state offered Stark a commission as brigadier general of the New Hampshire Militia. He accepted on the strict condition that he would not be answerable to Continental Army authority. Soon after receiving his commission, Stark assembled 1,492 militiamen in civilian clothes with personal firearms. He traveled to Manchester, Vermont where he was ordered by Major General Benjamin Lincoln (of the Continental Army) to reinforce Philip Schuyler's Continental Army on the Hudson River. Stark refused to obey Lincoln, who was another general whom he believed was unfairly promoted over his head. Lincoln was diplomatic enough to allow him to operate independently against the rear of General John Burgoyne's British army.

Burgoyne sent an expedition under Lieutenant Colonel Friedrich Baum to capture American supplies at Bennington, Vermont. Baum commanded 374 Brunswick infantry and dismounted dragoons, 300 Indians, loyalists, and Canadians, and two 3-pound cannons manned by 30 Hessians. Stark heard about the raid and marched his force to Bennington. Meanwhile, Baum received intelligence that Bennington was held by 1,800 men. On August 14, Baum asked Burgoyne for reinforcements but assured his army commander that his opponents would not give him much trouble. The Brunswick officer then fortified his position and waited for Lieutenant Colonel Heinrich von Breymann's 642 soldiers and two 6-pound cannons to reach him. Colonel Seth Warner also set out with his 350 men to reinforce Stark.

After waiting out a day of rain, at 3:00 PM on the 16th Stark sent 200 militia to the right, 300 men to the left, 200 troops against a position held by Tories, and 100 men on a feint against Baum's main redoubt. In the face of these attacks, the Indians, loyalists, and Canadians fled, leaving Baum stranded in his main position. As his envelopment took effect, Stark led his remaining 1,200 troops against Baum, saying, "We'll beat them before night or Molly Stark's a widow." After an ammunition wagon exploded, Baum's men tried to hack their way out of the trap with their dragoon sabers. Baum was fatally hit and his men gave up around 5:00 PM. With Stark's men somewhat scattered by their victory, Breymann's column appeared on the scene. At this moment Colonel Seth Warner's 350 Green Mountain Boys arrived to confront Breymann's men. Between Stark and Warner, the Germans were stopped and then forced to withdraw. The New Hampshire and Vermont soldiers severely mauled Breymann's command but the German officer managed to get away with about two-thirds of his force. Historian Mark M. Boatner wrote,

As a commander of New England militia Stark had one rare and priceless quality: he knew the limitations of his men. They were innocent of military training, undisciplined, and unenthusiastic about getting shot. With these men he killed over 200 of Europe's vaunted regulars with a loss of 14 Americans killed.

Another version has Stark rallying his troops with the cry, "There are your enemies, the Red Coats and the Tories. They are ours, or this night Molly Stark sleeps a widow!"

Stark's action contributed to the surrender of Burgoyne's northern army after the Battles of Saratoga by raising American morale, by keeping the British from getting supplies, and by subtracting several hundred men from the enemy order of battle. Stark reported 14 killed and 42 wounded. Of Baum's 374 professional soldiers, only nine men escaped. For this feat Stark won his coveted promotion to brigadier general in the Continental Army on October 4, 1777.

Saratoga is seen as the turning point in the Revolutionary War, as it was the first major defeat of a British general and it convinced the French that the Americans were worthy of military aid. After the Battle of Freeman's Farm Gen. Stark's brigade moved into a position at Stark's Knob cutting off Burgoyne's retreat to Lake George and Lake Champlain.

John Stark sat as a judge in the court martial that in September 1780 found British Major John André guilty of spying and aiding in the conspiracy of Benedict Arnold to surrender West Point to the British.

He was the commander of the Northern Department three times between 1778 and 1781 along with commanding a brigade at the Battle of Springfield in June 1780.

== Later years ==
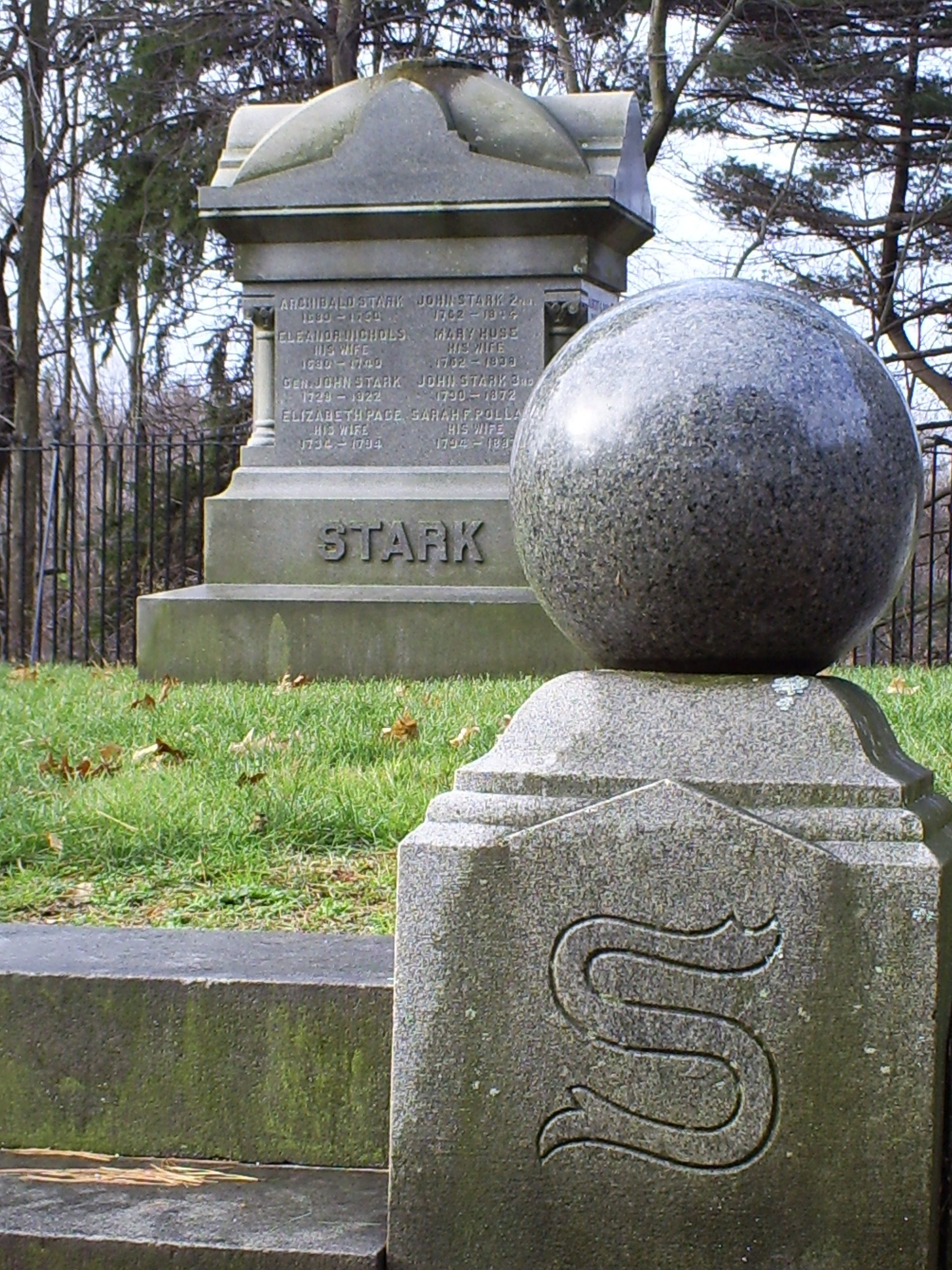
Gravesite in Stark Park, Manchester, New Hampshire

After serving with distinction throughout the rest of the war, Stark retired to his farm in Derryfield, renamed Manchester in 1810, where he died on May 8, 1822, at the age of 93.

It has been said that of all the Revolutionary War generals, Stark was the only true Cincinnatus because he truly retired from public life at the end of the war. In 1809, a group of Bennington veterans gathered to commemorate the battle. General Stark, then aged 81, was not well enough to travel, but he sent a letter to his comrades, which closed "Live free or die: Death is not the worst of evils." The motto Live Free or Die became the New Hampshire state motto in 1945. Stark and the Battle of Bennington were later commemorated with the 306-foot (93 m) tall Bennington Battle Monument and a statue of Stark in Bennington, Vermont.

== Historic sites ==
There is a New Hampshire historical marker (number 48) near John Stark's birthplace on the east side of New Hampshire Route 28 (Rockingham Road) in Derry, New Hampshire, just south of the intersection of Lawrence Road. There is a second stone marker at the actual homestead location.

Stark's childhood home is located at 2000 Elm Street in Manchester, New Hampshire. The home was built in 1736 by John's father Archibald. The building is now owned by the Molly Stark Chapter of the Daughters of the American Revolution. The property, which is listed on the National Register of Historic Places, is open by appointment only. Manchester's Stark Park, also a listed property, is home to his grave and is named in his honor. There is a bronze statue of General Stark in front of the New Hampshire Statehouse in Concord; it was dedicated in 1890. A statue of General Stark is also located in front of the West Annex of the City of Manchester's City Hall. New Castle's Fort Stark was renamed for the General in 1900. It was one of seven forts built in the area to protect the nearby city of Portsmouth. The historic site is placed on a peninsula known as Jerry's point (or Jaffrey's Point) on the southeast side of the island.

In 1894 the state of New Hampshire donated a statue of General Stark for the National Statuary Hall of the United States Capitol.

== See also ==
- Isaac Royall House, Stark's headquarters in Medford, Massachusetts
- Statue of John Stark by Carl Conrads
- Fort at Number 4

Many notable places in the United States were named after John Stark and his wife Molly, including:

- Fort Stark (New Hampshire)
- John Stark Regional High School (New Hampshire)
- Stark County, Illinois
- Stark County, Ohio
- Stark Mountain (Vermont)
- Stark's Knob (New York)
- Stark, New Hampshire
- Stark, New York
- Starke County, Indiana
- Starks, Maine
- Starksboro, Vermont
- Starkville, Colorado
- Starkville, Georgia
- Starkville, Mississippi
- Starkville, New York
- Starkville, Pennsylvania
