= Hercules Mooney =

American politician

Hercules Mooney (1715–1800) was an Irish veteran of the French and Indian and American Revolutionary wars.

Born to a catholic family from present day County Offaly, in 1733 he emigrated to the Thirteen Colonies and settled in Dover, New Hampshire. In 1738 he married Elizabeth Evans, also of Dover. Having been a tutor back in Ireland, Mooney became a teacher and schoolmaster at Dover and after 1750 in Durham.

In 1757 Mooney joined the New Hampshire Provincial Regiment to fight in the French and Indian War as a captain in command of a company of soldiers. Capt. Mooney was at the Siege of Fort William Henry that ended in the fall of the fort and attack by the Native Americans. After the end of the war Mooney returned to Durham to teach and was elected selectman in 1765.

In 1775 he was a delegate to the provincial congress at Exeter, New Hampshire and in 1776 was appointed lieutenant colonel in the Continental Army. Lt. Col. Mooney served in Col. Pierse Long's regiment (Long's Regiment) and fought at the Battle of Fort Anne during the Saratoga campaign. During 1778 and 1779 Col. Mooney served on New Hampshire's Committee of Safety. In June 1779 he was given command of a regiment of the New Hampshire Militia that was sent to Rhode Island to keep watch on the British Army at Newport.

After the end of the Revolutionary War Col. Mooney moved to Holderness, New Hampshire and served as a justice of the peace for Grafton County and in the New Hampshire General Court. He died at his home in April 1800.

== Sources ==
- A List of The Revolutionary Soldiers of Dublin, N.H. by Samuel Carroll Derby, Press of Spahr & Glenn, Columbus, Ohio 1901
- State Builders: An Illustrated Historical and Biographical Record of the State of New Hampshire. State Builders Publishing Manchester, N.H., 1903
