= Battle of Fort Anne =

1777 battle of the American Revolutionary War

- Part of the American Revolutionary War
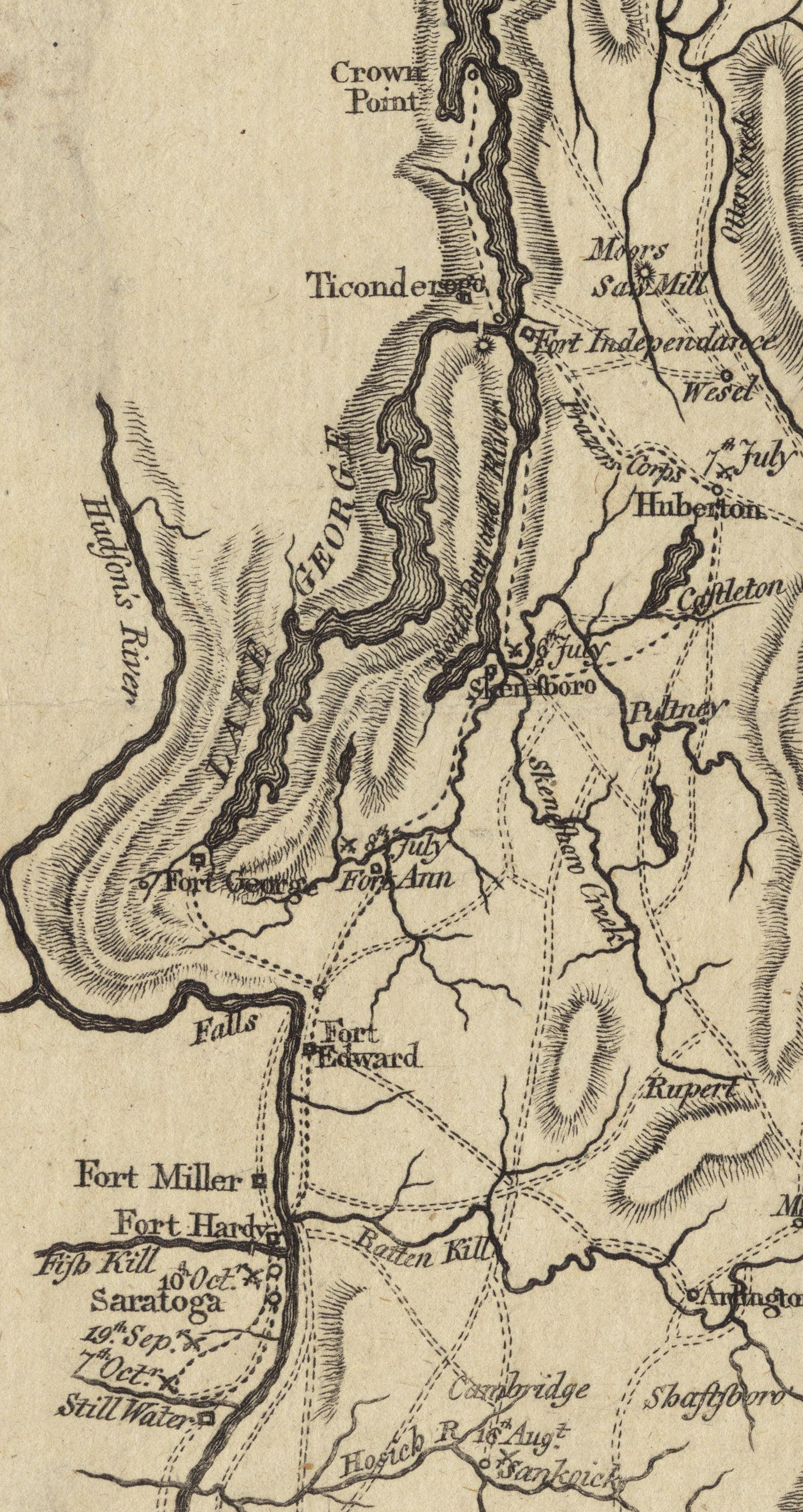
- Detail of a 1780 map; battle site is marked near the bottom
Date	July 8, 1777
Location	present-day Fort Ann, New York 43°25′34.03″N 73°28′49.84″W
Result	British victory

Belligerents
Great Britain	United States

Commanders and leaders
(Kingdom of Great Britain) John Hill; (Kingdom of Great Britain) Claude-Nicolas-Guillaume de Lorimier	(United States) Pierse Long; (United States) Henry K. Van Rensselaer

Strength
200 British regulars	About 1,000 soldiers and militia

Casualties and losses
13 killed; 22 wounded; 3 captured	50–200 killed, wounded, and captured

The Battle of Fort Anne, fought on July 8, 1777, was an engagement between Continental Army forces in retreat from Fort Ticonderoga and forward elements of John Burgoyne's much larger British army that had driven them from Ticonderoga, early in the Saratoga campaign of the American Revolutionary War.

Burgoyne, surprised by the American withdrawal from Fort Ticonderoga, hurried as many of his troops as possible forward in pursuit of the retreating Americans. The main body of the American forces had departed Fort Independence down the road to Hubbardton, and a smaller body of troops, accompanying the sick, wounded, and camp followers that had also evacuated the fort, had sailed up Lake Champlain to Skenesboro, moving from there overland to Fort Edward. That group, which included about 600 men under arms, paused at Fort Anne, where a smaller advance company from Burgoyne's army caught up to them. The British, clearly outnumbered, sent for reinforcements. The Americans decided to attack while they had the numerical advantage, and succeeded in nearly surrounding the British position about three quarters of a mile (1 km) north of the fort. The Americans retreated back to the fort when war whoops indicated the arrival of British reinforcements. While that was a ruse (the reinforcements were a single officer), it saved the British force from probable capture. More of Burgoyne's army soon came down the road, forcing the Americans to retreat from Fort Anne to Fort Edward.

It has been claimed that a flag was flown at Fort Anne that may have been the first instance of a flag consisting of stars and stripes; the claim is unproven and likely false.

== Background ==
On the night of July 5–6, the Continental Army forces occupying Fort Ticonderoga were ordered to evacuate the fort by General Arthur St. Clair, following the approach of General John Burgoyne's 8,000-man army. Burgoyne's men had placed a gun battery on top of Mount Defiance, overlooking the fort, and the American avenues of retreat were at risk of being cut off.

Most of the American forces left Ticonderoga and the surrounding defense works via Fort Independence and the road to Hubbardton. About 600 men under Colonel Pierse Long, most of them from New Hampshire, sailed up the lake in a flotilla consisting of 5 armed galleys and over 200 smaller transport vessels. These vessels were loaded with as many of the sick from the fort as they could take, stores and supplies, and armaments. Believing the log boom and pontoon bridge placed between Ticonderoga and Mount Independence to be sufficient to delay the British pursuit, Long began to sail up the lake toward Skenesboro, the southernmost navigable point on the lake, at a leisurely pace.

== Pursuit ==
The British, however, were hardly slowed down by the water defenses. Burgoyne, once he learned of the American withdrawal on the morning of July 6, ordered the defenses to be taken down. With well-placed gunfire, the bridge and boom were eliminated as obstacles in the space of 30 minutes. Then, Burgoyne, breaking with rigid military discipline, ordered troops to follow southward as rapidly as possible, instead of remaining in formation, while he sailed southward in pursuit. Assisted by favorable winds, he was within three miles (4.8 km) of Skenesboro by the end of July 6, where the Americans, who arrived only two hours earlier, had a small stockade fort. In an attempt to surround the position, Burgoyne landed about 200 men from the 9th, 20th, and 21st regiments, commanded by Lieutenant Colonel John Hill, at a point south of Skenesboro with the objective of cutting off the road to Fort Anne.

The Americans were in the process of portaging around the falls at Skenesboro to Wood Creek when Burgoyne's boats arrived and opened fire. Enterprise, Liberty, and Gates were destroyed by the Americans, and two ships, Trumbull and Revenge, were forced to surrender. In the process many of the American supplies were either destroyed or abandoned to the British. The Americans retreated toward Fort Anne in disarray, but not before starting a fire that eventually engulfed most of the structures at Skenesboro. When they reached Fort Anne they were met by 400 New York militia under Henry van Rensselaer, that had been sent by General Philip Schuyler from Fort Edward after he received news of the retreat from Ticonderoga.

The British pursuers under Hill, when they finally reached the road, captured more American supplies, sick and wounded, and camp followers that trailed behind the main body, and moved south until they were about one mile (1.6 km) from Fort Anne. Here they encountered an American reconnaissance party numbering about 170 under Captain James Gray; in the ensuing skirmish one American was killed and three more wounded before the Americans retreated to the fort.

== Battle ==
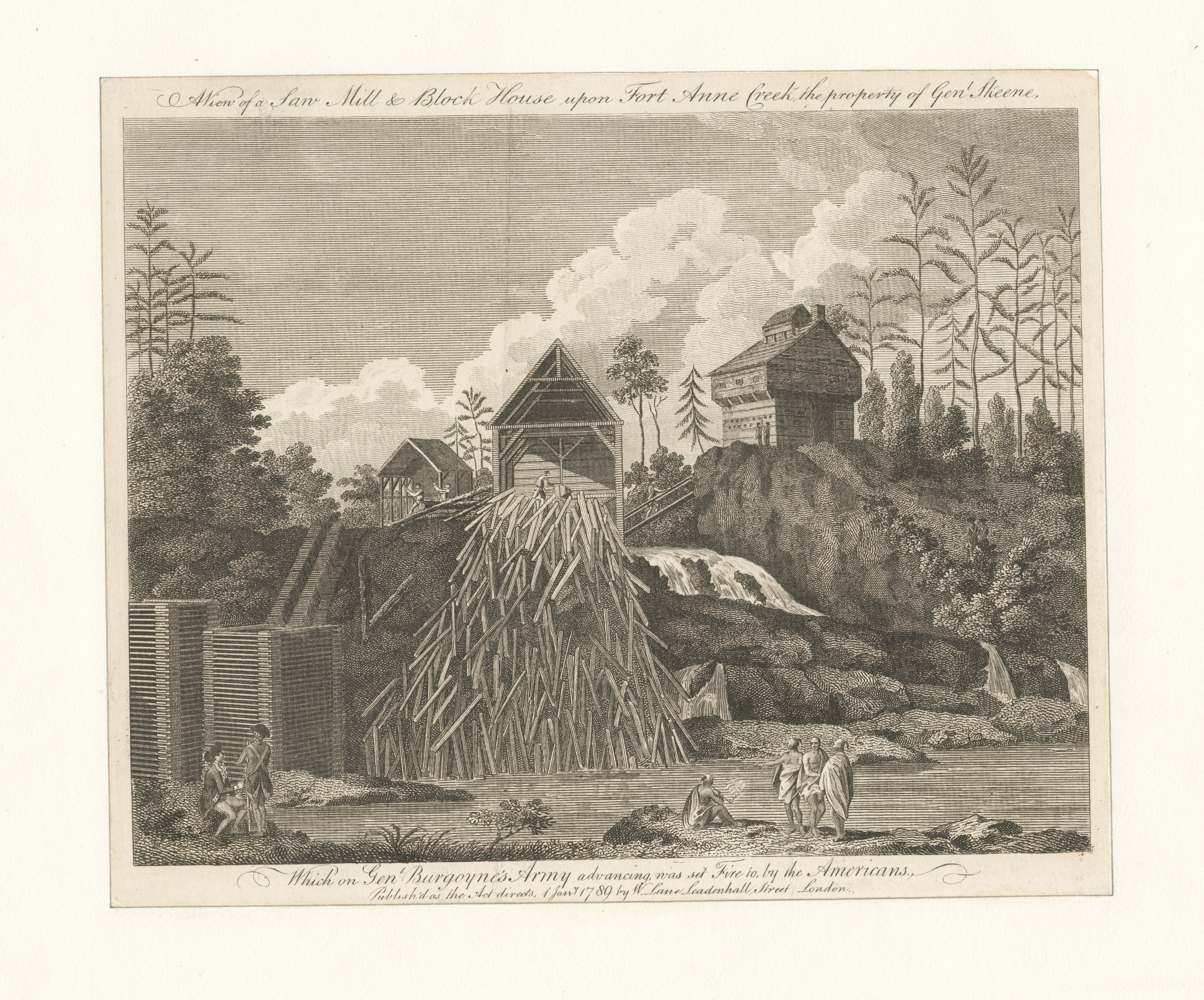
A view of a saw mill and block house on Fort Anne Creek as General Burgoyne's army was advancing, was set fire by the Americans

On the morning of July 8, a supposed American deserter, who was really a spy, informed Hill that the fort was occupied by nearly 1,000 demoralized troops. Opting not to attack the numerically superior force, Hill sent a message back to Burgoyne outlining the situation. Burgoyne ordered the 20th and 21st regiments to quick-march toward Fort Anne in support, but poor weather hampered their movement, and they did not arrive until after the battle. The "deserter" returned to Fort Anne and reported on the British position and troop strength.

Long, seeing how few British soldiers were following him, decided to attack their position. Moving as stealthily as possible, his force tried to surround the British while they were still on the road. However, Hill's men heard the rebel movements on their flanks and retreated to a higher position, abandoning some wounded men, who were eventually captured by the Americans. When the Americans opened fire, it was "a heavy and well-directed fire", according to one British officer. The battle lasted for more than 2 hours, until both sides were nearly out of ammunition, and the British were virtually surrounded by Americans. The sound of Indian war whoops from the north prompted the Americans to retreat, and they retired to the fort with their wounded, including Van Rensselaer, who had taken a shot in the hip.

As it turned out, there were no Indians, but only a single British officer, John Money of the 9th regiment, Burgoyne's deputy quartermaster. He had been leading a group of Indians, but when they seemed reluctant to fight the Americans, Money became impatient and ran ahead of them; it was his war cries that brought an end to the battle.

== Aftermath ==
Back at the fort the Americans held a brief council. From a woman that the British had freed, they heard that 2,000 or more British troops under the command of General Phillips were rapidly advancing. Long's men, as they were nearly out of ammunition, withdrew toward Fort Edward, burning the stockaded fort. Both sides claimed victory in the battle, since the British had successfully stood their ground, and the Americans had very nearly forced them to surrender. Any American claim for victory was tempered by the fact that the force they had defeated was clearly the vanguard of a much larger British force.

A British officer recovered some regimental banners either during the engagement or after the American retreat from Fort Anne. It is widely claimed that one of the flags captured was a new design of American flag with thirteen red and white stripes and a constellation of stars, which would represent the earliest known use of the stars and stripes motif. However, the story is likely untrue, as the time needed for news of the flag design approved by Congress to travel, followed by construction of such a flag and then its delivery to such a remote location, renders the story implausible, and the flags that are known to have been recovered bear no resemblance to the US flag.

== Battlefield preservation ==
The American Battlefield Trust and its partners have acquired and preserved 160 acres (0.65 km^{2}) of the battlefield.
