= Siege of Fort Ticonderoga (1777) =

Part of the American Revolutionary War

- Part of the American Revolutionary War
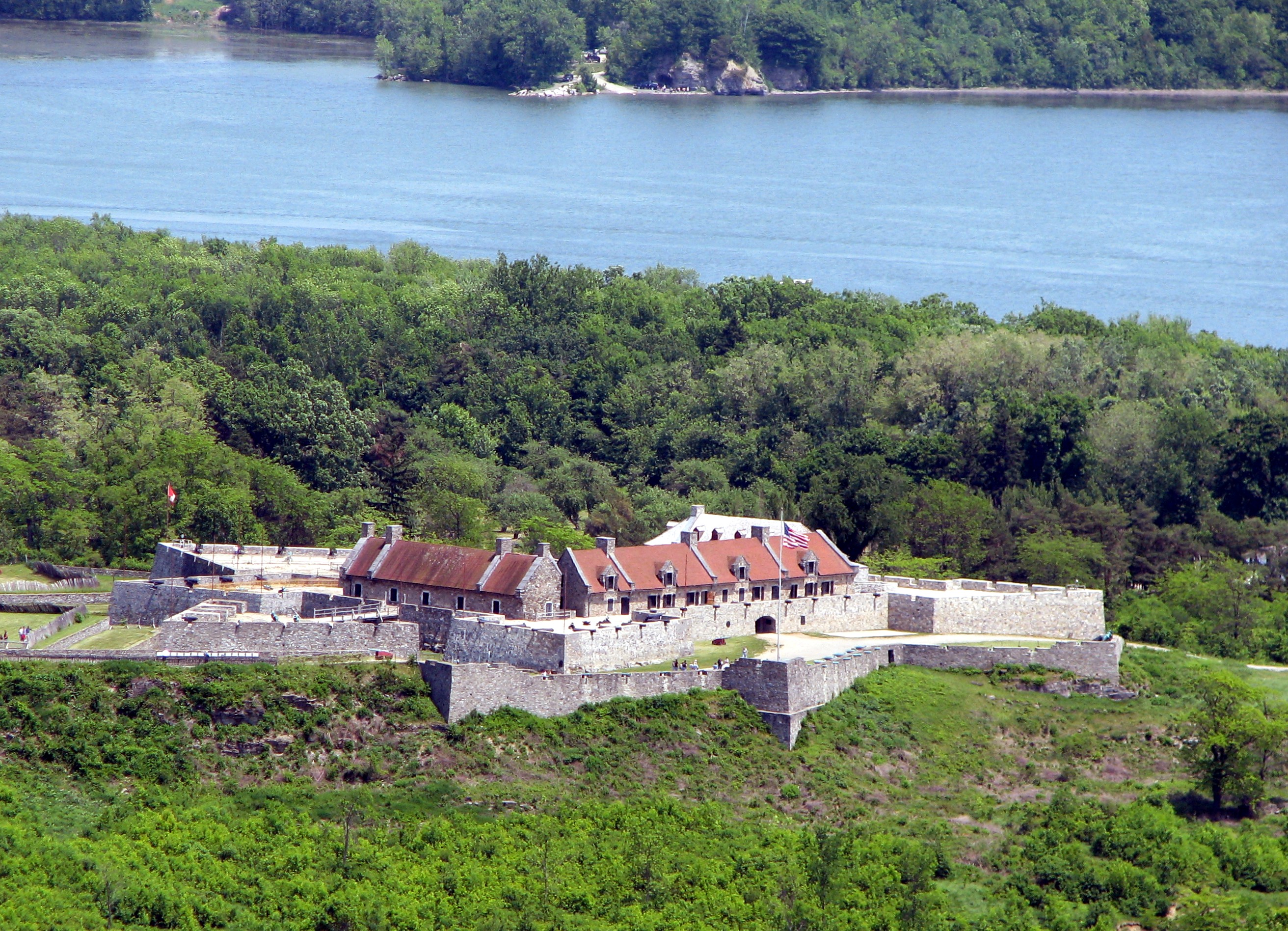
- Fort Ticonderoga as seen from Mount Defiance
Date	2–6 July 1777
Location	Fort Ticonderoga, New York 43°50′29″N 73°23′17″W
Result	British victory

Belligerents
Great Britain; Brunswick-Wolfenbüttel; Hesse-Hanau; Iroquois	United States

Commanders and leaders
John Burgoyne; William Phillips	Arthur St. Clair; Philip Schuyler

Strength
7,800	3,000

Casualties and losses
5 killed	7 killed 11 wounded

The siege of Fort Ticonderoga occurred between 2 July and 6 July 1777 at Fort Ticonderoga, near the southern end of Lake Champlain in the state of New York. Lieutenant General John Burgoyne's 8,000-man army occupied high ground above the fort, and nearly surrounded the defenses. These movements precipitated the occupying Continental Army, an under-strength force of 3,000 under the command of General Arthur St. Clair, to withdraw from Ticonderoga and the surrounding defenses. Some gunfire was exchanged, and there were some casualties, but there was no formal siege and no pitched battle. Burgoyne's army occupied Fort Ticonderoga and Mount Independence, the extensive fortifications on the Vermont side of the lake, without opposition on 6 July. Advance units pursued the retreating Americans.

The uncontested surrender of Ticonderoga caused an uproar in the American public and in its military circles, as Ticonderoga was widely believed to be virtually impregnable, and a vital point of defense. General St. Clair and his superior, General Philip Schuyler, were vilified by Congress. Both were eventually exonerated in courts martial, but their careers were adversely affected. Schuyler had already lost his command to Horatio Gates by the time of the court martial, and St. Clair held no more field commands for the remainder of the war.

== Background ==
In September 1775, early in the American Revolutionary War, the American Continental Army embarked on an invasion of Quebec. The invasion ended in disaster in July 1776, with the army chased back to Fort Ticonderoga by a large British army that arrived in Quebec in May 1776. A small Continental Navy fleet on Lake Champlain was defeated in the October 1776 Battle of Valcour Island. The delay required by the British to build their fleet on Lake Champlain caused General Guy Carleton to hold off on attempting an assault on Ticonderoga in 1776. Although his advance forces came within three miles of Ticonderoga, the lateness of the season and the difficulty of maintaining supply lines along the lake in winter caused him to withdraw his forces back into Quebec.

=== British forces ===
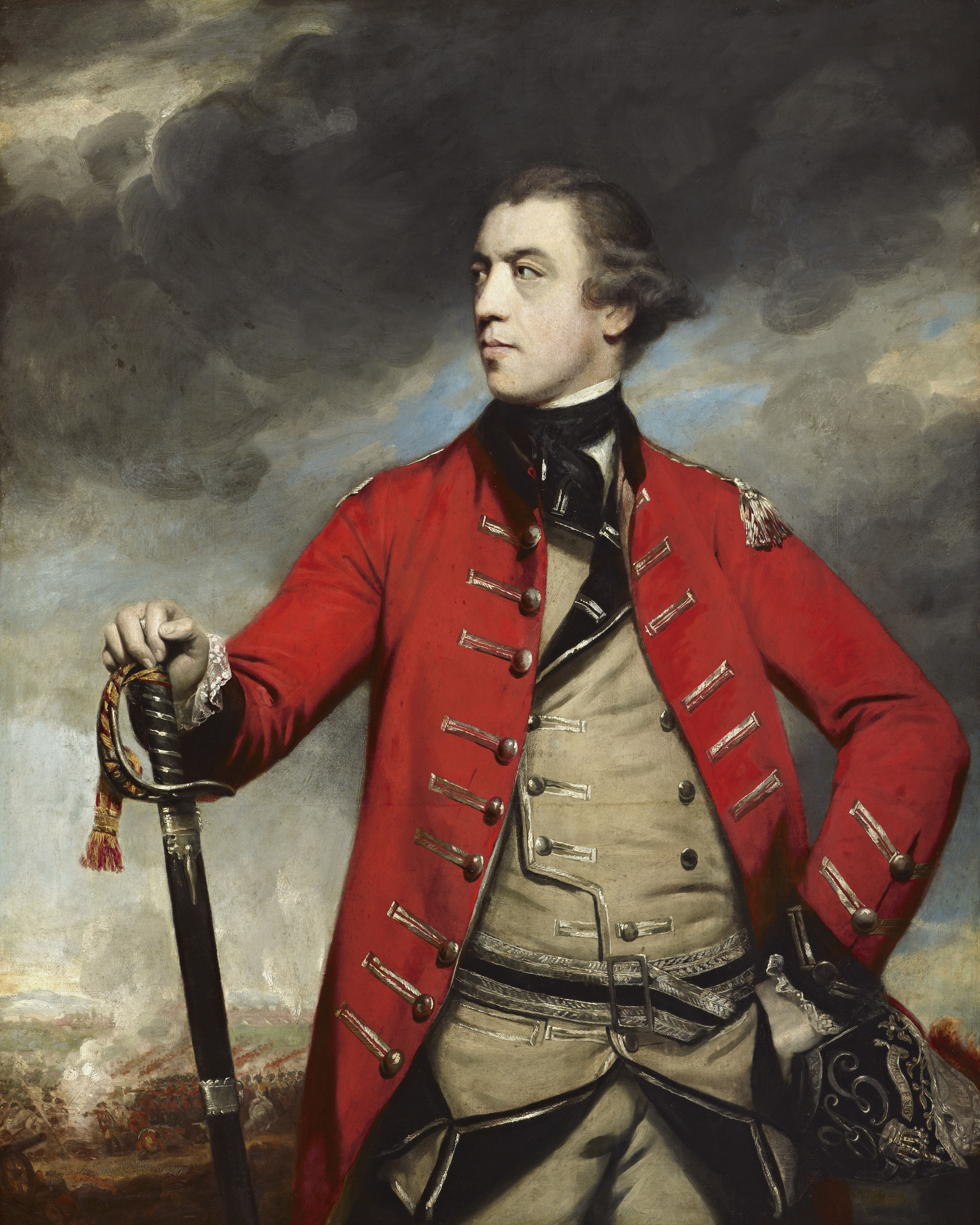
Portrait of John Burgoyne by Joshua Reynolds, 1766

General John Burgoyne arrived in Quebec in May 1777 and prepared to lead the British forces assembled there south with the aim of gaining control of Ticonderoga and the Hudson River valley, dividing the rebellious provinces. The British Infantry included; 9th, 20th, 21st, 24th, 47th, 53rd, 62nd Regiments of Foot, King's Loyal Americans, and Queen's Loyal Rangers. The British force also consisted of a sizable Hessian force consisting of Prinz Ludwig's Dragoons and Specht's, Von Rhetz's, Von Riedesel's, Prinz Frederich's, Erbprinz's and Breyman's Jäger regiments.

Most of these forces had arrived in 1776, and many participated in the campaign that drove the American army out of Quebec.

The total size of Burgoyne's regular army was about 7,000. In addition to the regulars, there were about 800 Indians, and a relatively small number of Canadiens and Loyalists, who acted primarily as scouts and screening reconnaissance. The army was also accompanied by more than 1,000 civilians, including a pregnant woman, and Baroness Riedesel with her three small children. Including these non-military personnel, the total number of people in Burgoyne's army was more than 10,000.

Burgoyne and General Carlton re-sited the troops at Fort Saint-Jean, near the northern end of Lake Champlain, on 14 June. By 21 June, the armada carrying the army was on the lake, and they had arrived at the unoccupied Fort Crown Point by 30 June. The Indians and other elements of the advance force laid down such an effective screen that the American defenders at Ticonderoga were unaware of either the exact location or strength of the force moving along the lake. While en route, Burgoyne authored a proclamation to the Americans, written in the turgid, pompous style for which he was well-known, and frequently criticized and parodied.

=== American defenses ===
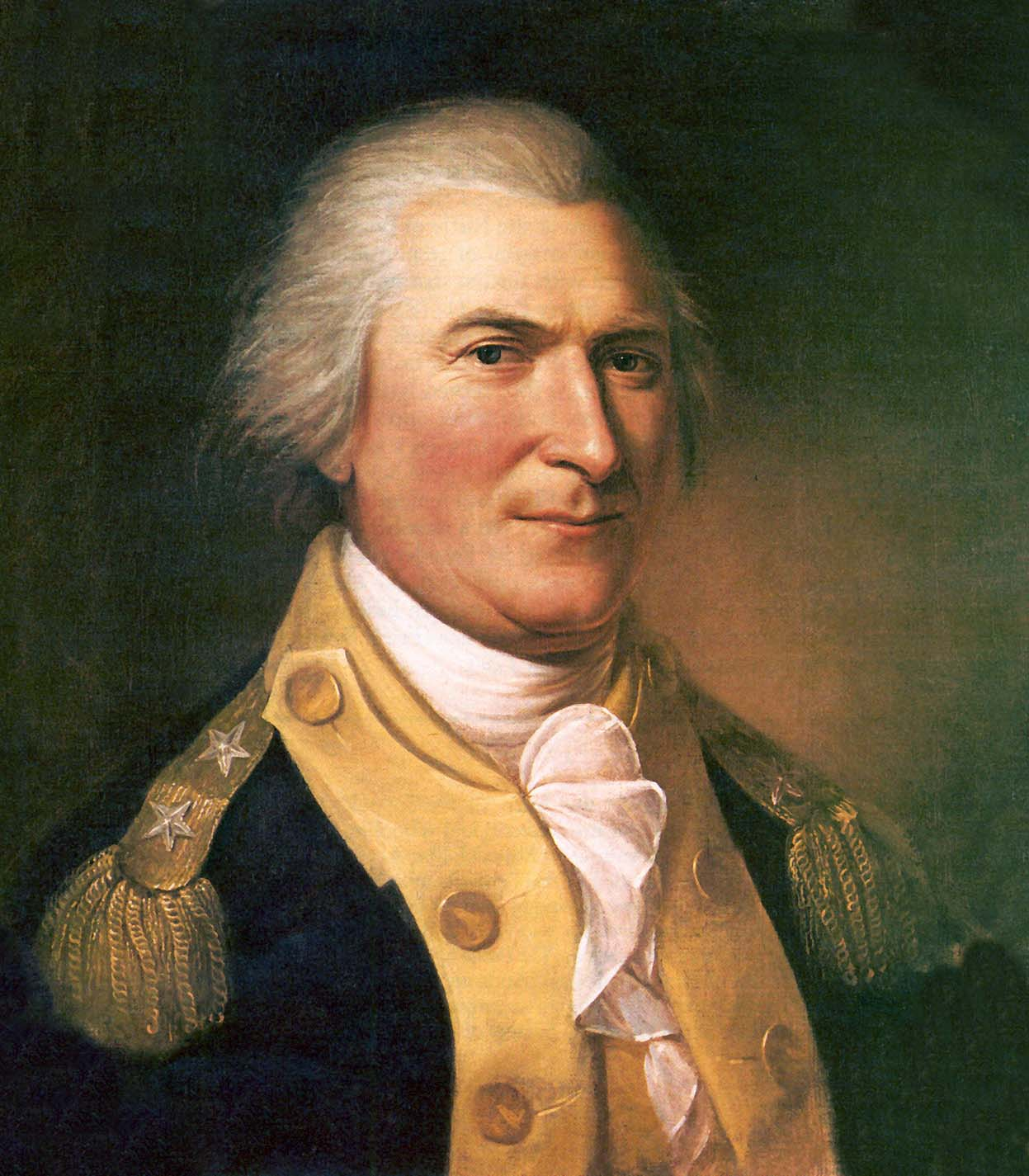
General Arthur St. Clair, portrait by Charles Willson Peale

American forces had occupied the forts at Ticonderoga and Crown Point since they captured them in May 1775 from a small garrison. In 1776 and 1777, they undertook significant efforts to improve the defenses surrounding Ticonderoga. A peninsula on the east side of the lake, renamed Mount Independence, was heavily fortified. To the north of old Fort Ticonderoga, the Americans built numerous redoubts, a large fort at the site earlier French fortifications, and a fort on Mount Hope. A quarter-mile long floating bridge was constructed across the lake to facilitate communication between Ticonderoga and Mount Independence.

Command at Ticonderoga went through a variety of changes early in 1777. Until 1777, General Philip Schuyler had headed the Continental Army's Northern Department, with General Horatio Gates in charge of Ticonderoga. In March 1777 the Continental Congress gave command of the whole department to Gates. Schuyler protested this action, which Congress reversed in May, at which point Gates, no longer willing to serve under Schuyler, left for Philadelphia. Command of the fort was then given to General Arthur St. Clair, who arrived only three weeks before Burgoyne's army.

The entire complex was manned by several under-strength regiments of the Continental Army and militia units from New York and nearby states. A war council held by Generals St. Clair and Schuyler on 20 June concluded that "the number of troops now at this post, which are under 2,500 effectives, rank and file, are greatly inadequate to the defense", and that "it is prudent to provide for a retreat". Consequently, plans were made for retreat along two routes. The first was by water to Skenesboro, the southernmost navigable point on the lake. The second was overland by a rough road leading east toward Hubbardton in the New Hampshire Grants (present-day Vermont).

The American force only consisted of two regiments, three composite units, and other undermanned corps; Francis' and Marshall's Massachusetts Regiments, and Hale's, Cilley's and Scammell's New Hampshire Continentals.

=== Sugar Loaf ===
A height called Sugar Loaf (now known as Mount Defiance) overlooked both Ticonderoga and Independence, and large cannons on that height would make the fort impossible to defend. This tactical problem had been pointed out by John Trumbull when Gates was in command. It was believed to be impossible for the British to place cannons on the heights, even though Trumbull, Anthony Wayne, and an injured Benedict Arnold climbed to the top and noted that gun carriages could probably be dragged up.

The defence, or lack thereof, of Sugar Loaf was complicated by the widespread perception that Fort Ticonderoga, with a reputation as the "Gibraltar of the North", had to be held. Neither abandoning the fort nor garrisoning it with a small force (sufficient to respond to a feint but not to an attack in strength) was viewed as a politically viable option. Defending the fort and the associated outer works would require all the troops currently there, leaving none to defend Sugar Loaf. Furthermore, George Washington and the Congress were of the opinion that Burgoyne, who was known to be in Quebec, was more likely to strike from the south, moving his troops by sea to New York City.

Following the war council of 20 June, Schuyler ordered St. Clair to hold out as long as he could, and to avoid having his avenues of retreat cut off. Schuyler took command of a reserve force of 700 at Albany, and Washington ordered four regiments to be held in readiness at Peekskill, further down the Hudson River.

== Battle ==
=== British advance ===
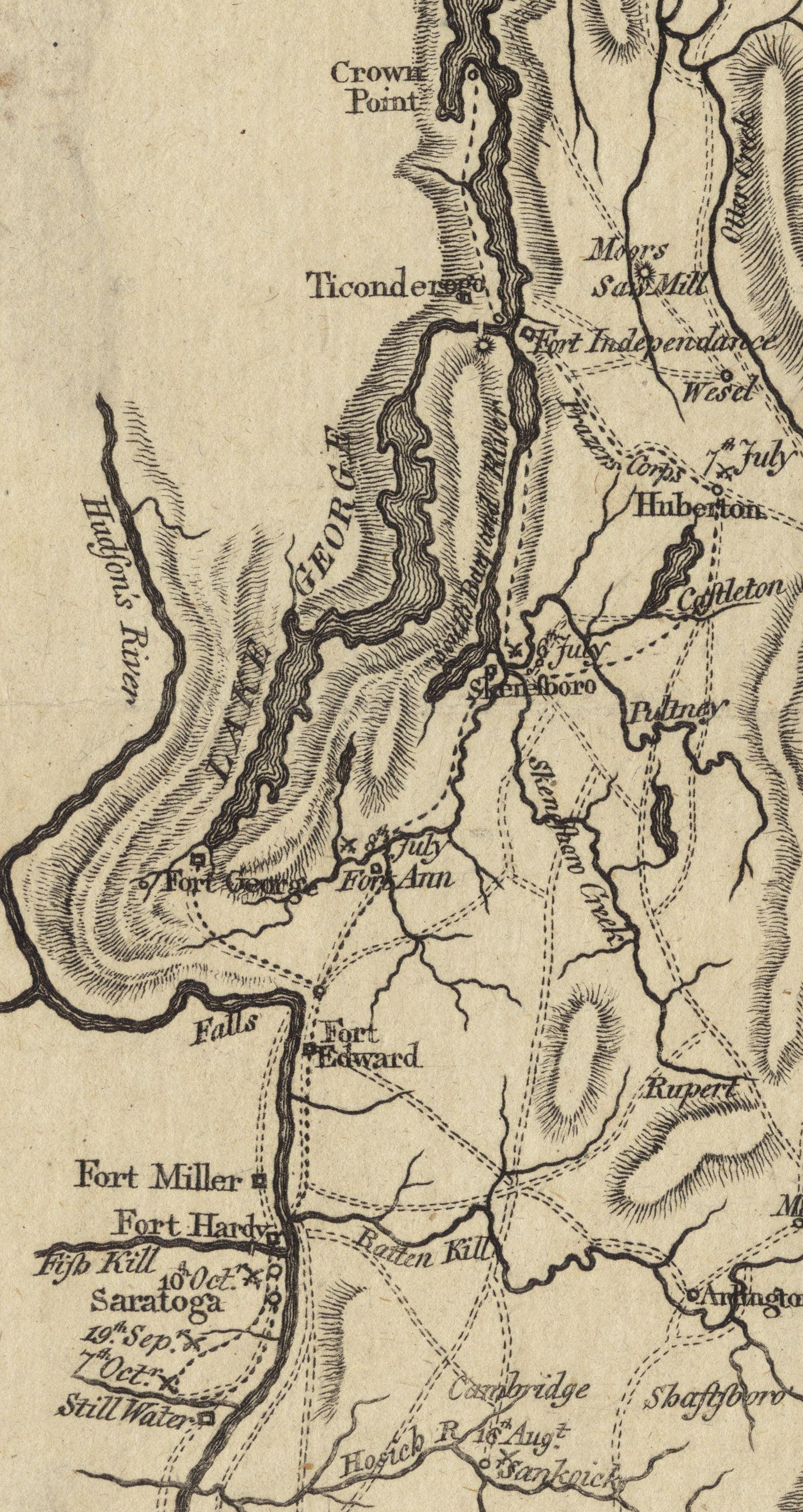
Detail of a 1780 map showing the Ticonderoga area, with battle sites marked

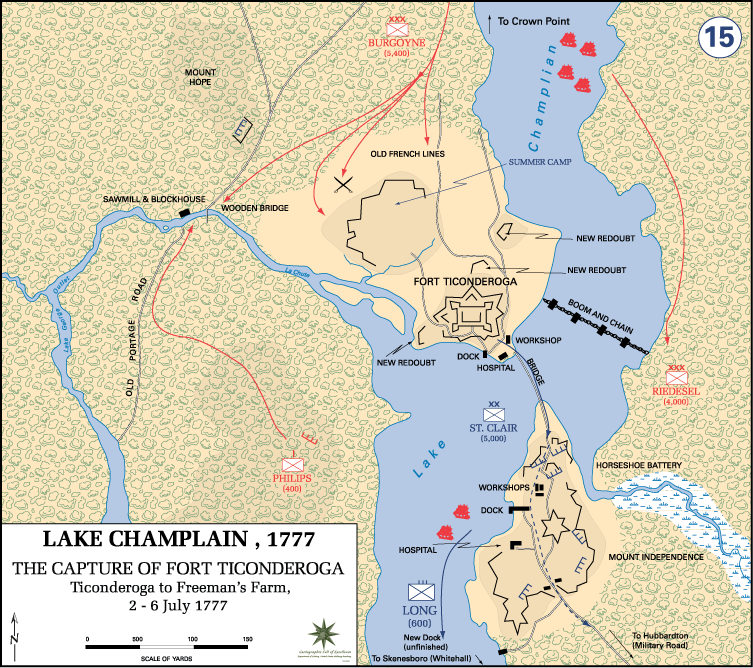
Siege of Fort Ticonderoga, 2–6 July 1777

On 1 July, General St. Clair was still unaware of the full strength of Burgoyne's army, which lay just 4 miles (6.4 km) away. Burgoyne had deployed Brigadier-General Simon Fraser's advance force and right column on the west side of the lake, hoping to cut off the defenses at Mount Hope. Riedesel and the German column were deployed on the east side of the lake, where their objective was Mount Independence and the road to Hubbardton. Burgoyne gave the order to advance on 2 July.

On the morning of 2 July, St. Clair decided to withdraw the men occupying the defence post at Mount Hope, which was exposed and subject to capture. The detachment there set fire to the works and retreated to the old French lines (so-called because they were the site of the French defence in the 1758 Battle of Carillon), getting away not long before the arrival of Burgoyne's advance guard. That afternoon, a company of British soldiers and Indians came toward those lines, but not near enough to do significant damage, and opened fire. St. Clair ordered his men to hold their fire until the enemy was closer, but James Wilkinson fired at a British soldier, spurring the untrained defenders to follow suit. The soldier Wilkinson fired at fell, and the British troops fled. When the man was captured, it turned out he was uninjured, and that he had fallen down because he was drunk. Through the deception of placing him with a man posing as a captured Loyalist, St. Clair learned the nature of the opposing forces.

Fraser's advance forces occupied Mount Hope on 3 July. Burgoyne ordered some of the scouts and Indians over to the east side of the lake for reconnaissance ahead of the German column, and brought some of the Germans over to the west side. Some of the British camp was placed close enough to the American lines that they were harassed by gunfire. This did not prevent the British from making repairs to the bridges on the portage road between Ticonderoga and Lake George.

British engineers discovered the strategic position of Sugar Loaf, and realized that the American withdrawal from Mount Hope gave them access to it. Starting on 2 July, they began clearing and building gun emplacements on top of that height, working carefully to avoid notice by the Americans. They spent several days drawing some of their larger guns up the slope. Burgoyne's objective was to spring the trap only when Riedesel's Germans were in position to cut off the American retreat.

=== American retreat ===
On 4 July, the Americans held a quiet celebration with some toasts to commemorate the previous year's Declaration of Independence. That night the British lost their element of surprise when some Indians lit fires on Sugar Loaf, alerting the Americans to their presence there. On the morning of 5 July, St. Clair held a war council in which the decision was made to retreat. Since their position was completely exposed, they delayed departure until nightfall, when their movements would be concealed. In a conversation with one of his quartermasters, St. Clair observed that he could "save his character and lose the army" by holding the fort, or "save the army and lose his character" if he retreated, giving a clear indication of the political reaction he was expecting to his decision.

All possible armaments, as well as invalids, camp followers, and supplies were loaded onto a fleet of more than 200 boats that began to move up the lake toward Skenesboro, accompanied by Colonel Pierse Long's regiment. Owing to a shortage of boats, four invalids were left behind, as were the very largest cannons and a variety of supplies—everything from tents to cattle. The rest of the army crossed to Mount Independence and headed down the Hubbardton road, which Riedesel's forces had not yet reached. A handful of men were left at the pontoon bridge with loaded cannons to fire on British attempts to cross it, but they were drunk when the British arrived the next morning.

The British occupied the forts without firing a single shot, and detachments from Fraser's and Riedesel's troops set out in pursuit of the retreating Americans on the Hubbardton road, while Burgoyne hurried some of his troops up the lake toward Skenesboro.

== Aftermath ==
At least seven Americans were killed and 11 wounded in skirmishing prior to the American retreat. British casualties were not tallied, but at least five were killed in skirmishes.

The Americans made good time on the Hubbardton road. Most of the force reached Castleton—a march of 30 miles (50 km)—on the evening of 6 July. The British pursuit resulted in the Battle of Hubbardton when they caught up with the rear guard on the morning of 7 July, but this enabled the main American body to escape, eventually joining forces with Schuyler at Fort Edward. The smaller American force that had fled by boat to Skenesboro fought off Burgoyne's advance force in the Battle of Fort Anne, but was forced to abandon equipment and many sick and wounded in skirmishing at Skenesboro.

The confrontation at Ticonderoga did not substantially slow Burgoyne's advance, but he was forced to leave a garrison of more than 900 men in the Ticonderoga area, and wait until 11 July for the dispersed elements of his army to regroup at Skenesboro. He then encountered delays in traveling the heavily wooded road between Skenesboro and Fort Edward, which General Schuyler's forces had effectively ruined by felling trees across it and destroying all its bridges in the swampy terrain. Burgoyne's campaign ultimately failed and he was forced to surrender after the Battles of Saratoga. General Gates reported to Governor George Clinton on 20 November that Ticonderoga and Independence had been abandoned and burned by the retreating British.

=== Political and public outcry ===
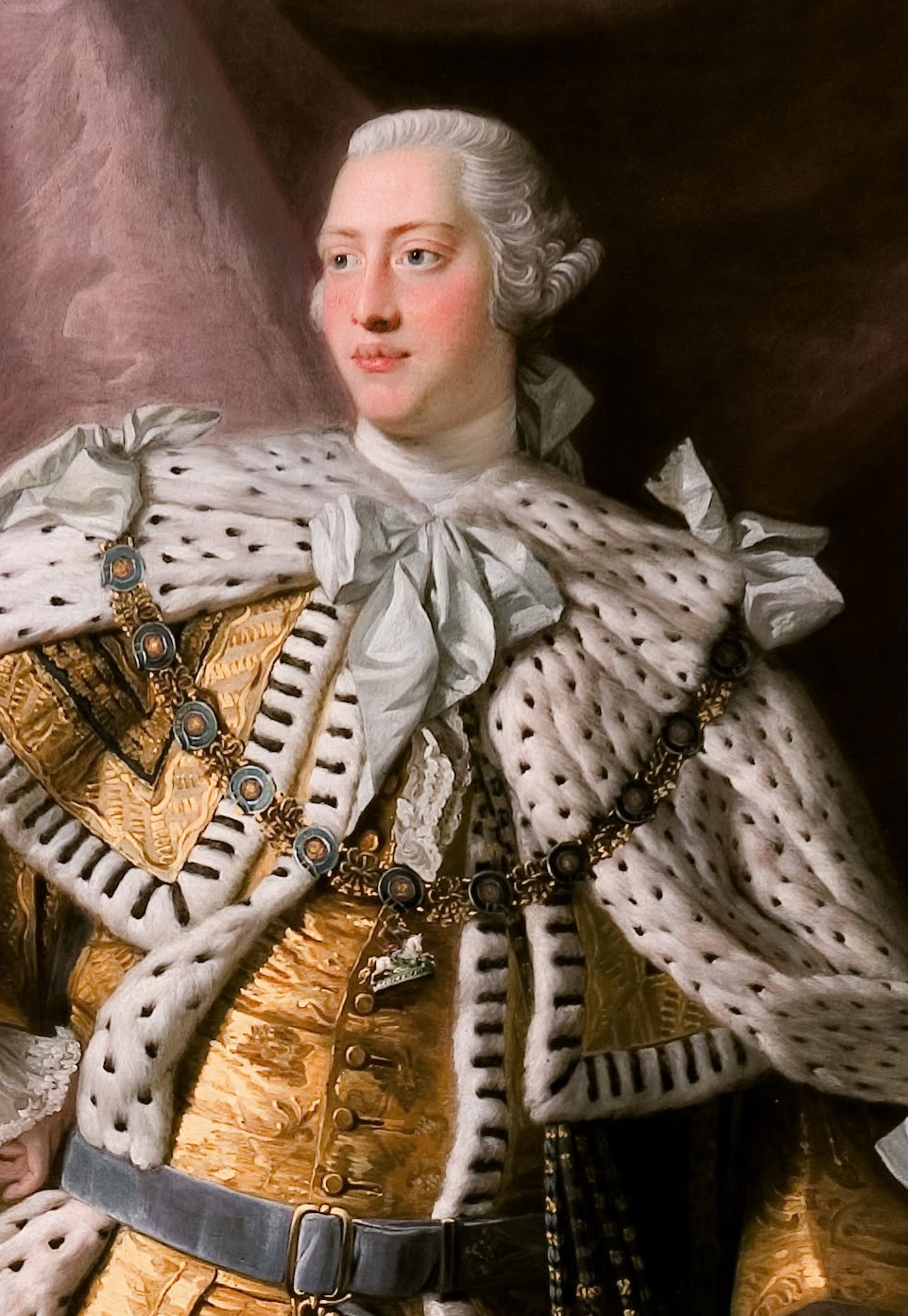
King George III, detail of portrait by Allan Ramsay

The political and public outcry after the withdrawal was significant. The Congress was appalled, and criticized both Schuyler and St. Clair for the loss. John Adams wrote, "I think we shall never be able to defend a post until we shoot a general", and George Washington said it was "an event of chagrin and surprise, not apprehended nor within the compass of my reasoning". Rumors circulated that St. Clair and Schuyler were traitors who had taken bribes in exchange for the retreat.

Schuyler was eventually removed as commander of the Northern Department, replaced by General Gates; the fall of Ticonderoga was among the reasons cited. St. Clair was removed from his command and sent to headquarters for an inquiry. He maintained that his conduct had been honorable, and demanded a review by court martial. The court martial was not held until September 1778 due to political intrigues against Washington; St. Clair was completely exonerated, although he was never given another field command. Schuyler was also cleared of any wrongdoing by a court martial.

The news made headlines in Europe. King George is reported to have burst into the chambers of the scantily clad Queen, exclaiming, "I have beat them! I have beat all the Americans!" The French and Spanish courts were less happy with the news, as they had been supporting the Americans, allowing them to use their ports, and engaging in trade with them. The action emboldened the British to demand that Spain and France close their ports to the Americans; this demand was rejected, heightening tensions among the European powers.

== See also ==
- List of American Revolutionary War battles
- American Revolutionary War § British northern strategy fails. Places 'Siege of Fort Ticonderoga (1777)' in overall sequence and strategic context.
