= Saratoga Battlefield =

Saratoga Battlefield may refer to:

- Saratoga campaign, part of the American Revolutionary War
  - Battles of Saratoga, climax of the Saratoga campaign
    - First Saratoga: Battle of Freeman's Farm, September 19, 1777
    - Second Saratoga: Battle of Bemis Heights, October 7, 1777
