= Long's Regiment =

- Active: 1776-1777
- Allegiance: Continental Congress of the United States
- Type: Infantry
- Part of: New Hampshire Line
- Engagements: Battle of Fort Ann

Commanders
- Notable commanders: Pierse Long and Hercules Mooney

Long's Regiment was an infantry regiment that was raised on May 14, 1776 at New Castle, New Hampshire under Colonel Pierse Long for service with the Continental Army. The regiment was stationed at Fort Ticonderoga and Mount Independence on Lake Champlain and fought a delaying action at Fort Ann, New York on July 8, 1777 against the advance units of John Burgoyne's army. The regiment was disbanded at the end of July 1777 in northern New York as the one year enlistments of the men ran out before the main engagements of the Saratoga Campaign. Col. Long and some of the men of the regiment joined other New Hampshire regiments that fought at Saratoga.

== Members of the Regiment ==
- Hercules Mooney
- Joseph Peirce

== Sources ==
- State Builders: An Illustrated Historical and Biographical Record of the State of New Hampshire. State Builders Publishing Manchester, NH 1903
