= Saratoga campaign =

Campaign of the American Revolutionary War

- Part of the Northern Theater of the American Revolutionary War
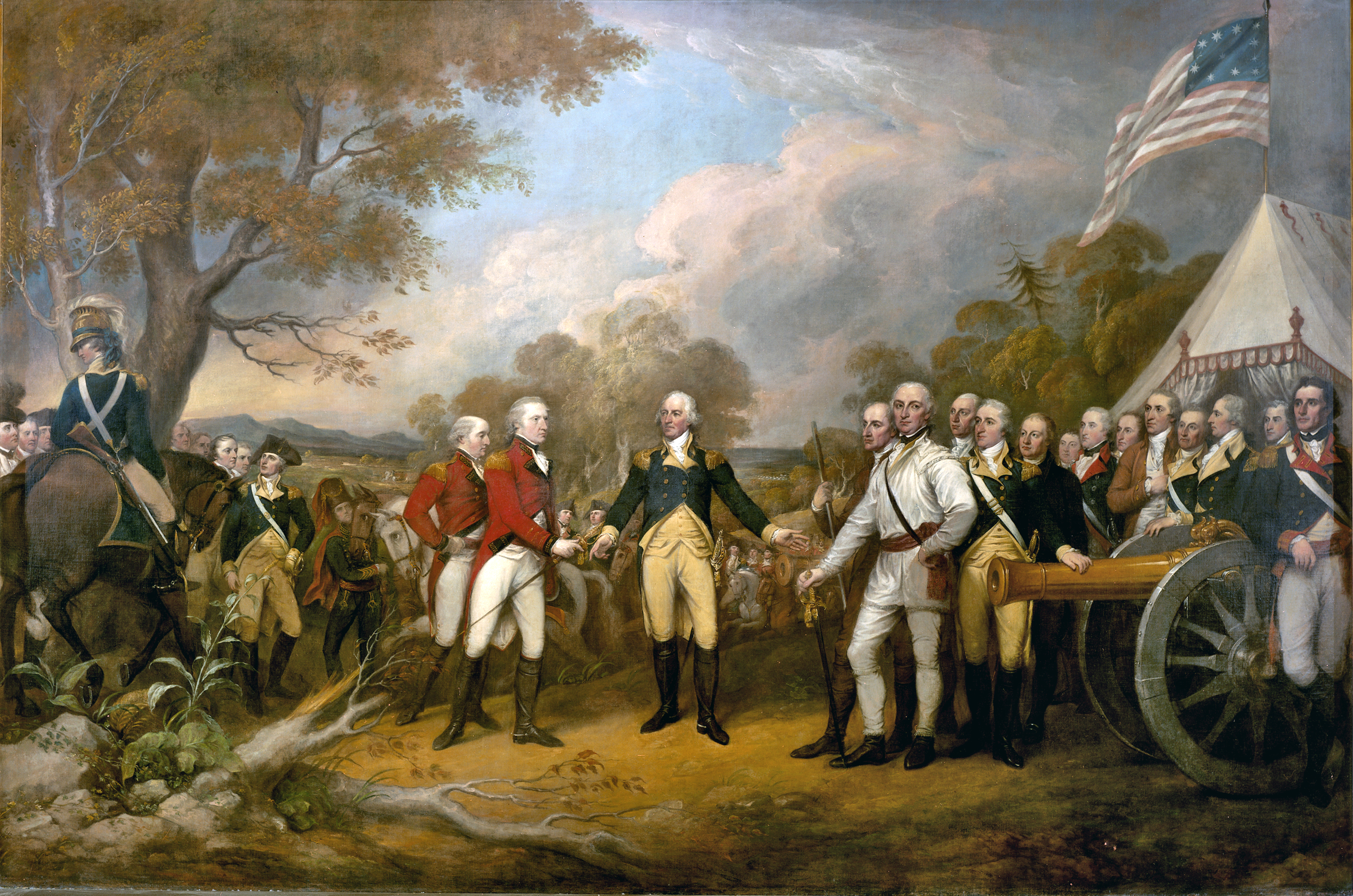
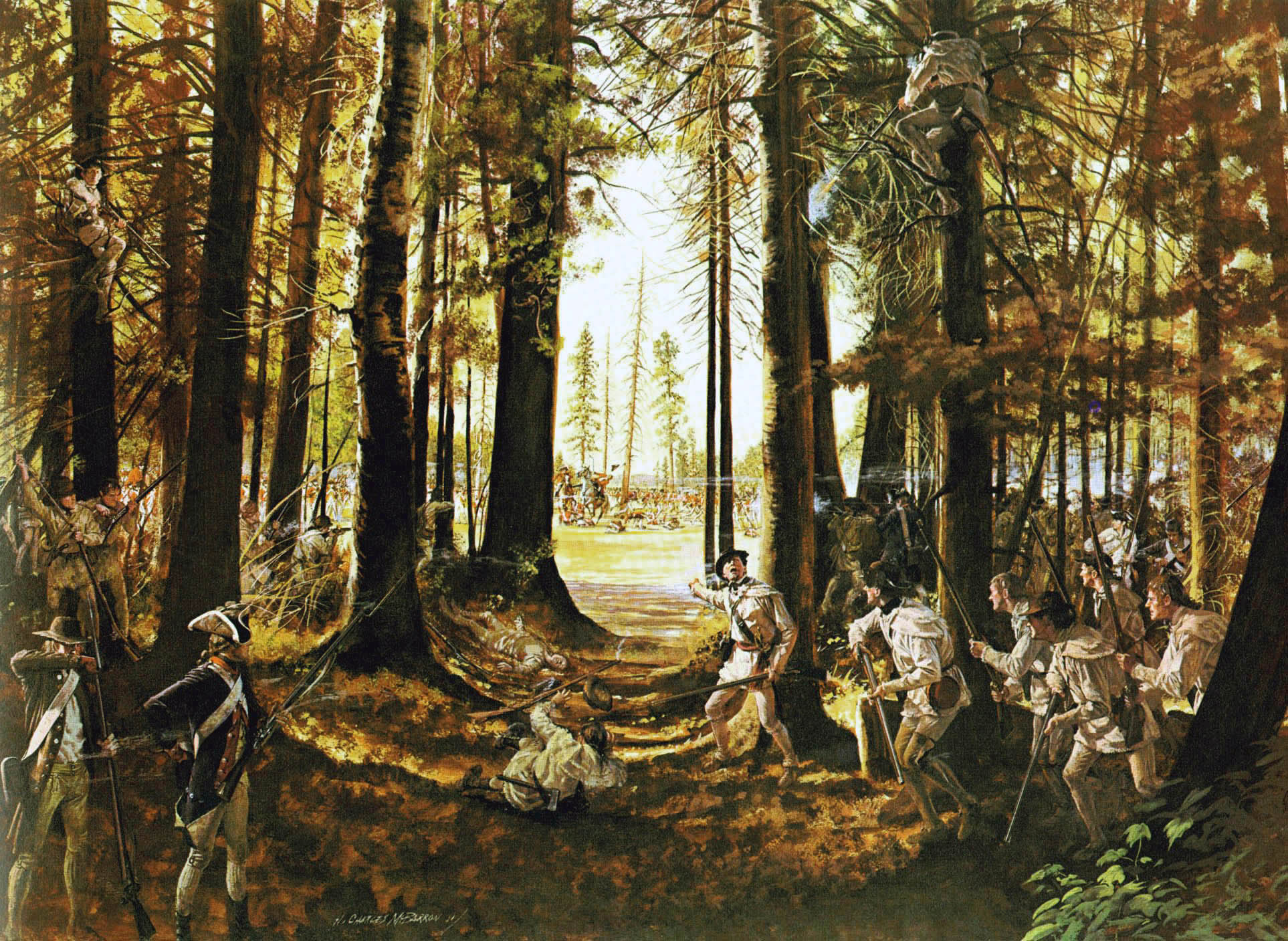
- Clockwise from top-left: Surrender of General Burgoyne by John Trumbull; The Battle of Bennington; Herkimer at the Battle of Oriskany by Frederick Coffay Yohn; Burial of General Simon Fraser; U.S. riflemen from Daniel Morgan's Corps, Oct. 7; Benedict Arnold at Bemis Heights
Date	June 14 – October 17, 1777
Location	Upstate New York and Vermont
Result	American victory: Surrender of Burgoyne's army; Beginning of Haudenosaunee civil war; Franco-American alliance (1778); French entry into the war against Great Britain

Belligerents
United States; Vermont; Oneida	Great Britain; (Kingdom of Great Britain) Quebec; Loyalists; Hesse-Cassel; Hesse-Hanau; Brunswick-Lüneburg; Haudenosaunee (minus Oneida) Other Native Americans

Commanders and leaders
Horatio Gates; Philip Schuyler; Arthur St. Clair; Benedict Arnold (WIA); B. Lincoln (WIA); Israel Putnam; George Clinton; James Clinton (WIA); John Stark; James Livingston; Seth Warner	John Burgoyne (surrendered); William Phillips (POW); Simon Fraser †; Barry St. Leger; Luc de la Corne; Henry Clinton; F. A. Riedesel (POW); H. von Breymann †; Joseph Brant; Charles de Langlade

Strength
25,000	8,500 (Burgoyne); 1,600 (St. Leger); 3,000 (Clinton)
- A Campaign streamer embroidered "Saratoga 2 July–17 October 1777" is awarded to American military units that participated in this campaign.

The Saratoga campaign in 1777 was an attempt by the British to gain military control of the strategically important Hudson River valley during the American Revolutionary War. It ended in the surrender of a British army, which historian Edmund Morgan argues, "was a great turning point of the war, because it won for Americans the foreign assistance which was the last element needed for victory."

The primary thrust of the campaign was planned and initiated by Lieutenant General John Burgoyne. Commanding a main force of some 8,000 men, he moved south in June from Quebec, boated south on Lake Champlain to Fort Ticonderoga and from there boated south on Lake George, then marched down the Hudson Valley to Saratoga. He initially skirmished there with the Patriot defenders with mixed results. The turning point of the campaign happened in August at the Battle of Bennington when militia forces from Vermont, New Hampshire, and Massachusetts defeated, killed, and captured around 1,000 Brunswick–Lüneburg and Hessian troops from Burgoyne's army. Then, after losses in the Battles of Saratoga in September and October, his deteriorating position and the ever-increasing size of the American army forced him to surrender his forces to the American general Horatio Gates on October 17.

In this critical British loss on the field of battle, the coordinated movements that had been drawn up in London did not materialize. Colonel Barry St. Leger had been assigned to move east through the Mohawk River valley on Albany, New York, but was forced to retreat during the siege of Fort Stanwix after losing his Indigenous allies. The major expedition planned from the south was not launched due to miscommunication with London when General William Howe sent his army to take Philadelphia rather than sending it up the Hudson River to link up with Burgoyne. A last-minute effort to reinforce Burgoyne from New York City was made in early October, but it was too little, too late.

The American victory was an enormous morale boost to the fledgling nation. More importantly, it convinced France to enter the war in alliance with the United States, openly providing money, soldiers, and munitions, as well as fighting a naval war worldwide against Britain.

== British strategy ==
Toward the end of 1776, it was apparent to many in England that the pacification of New England was very difficult due to the high concentration of Patriots. The British decided to isolate New England and concentrate on the central and southern regions where Loyalists supposedly could be rallied.

In December 1776, General John Burgoyne met with Lord Germain, the British Secretary of State for the Colonies and the government official responsible for managing the war, to set strategy for 1777. There were two main armies in North America to work with: General Guy Carleton's army in Quebec and General William Howe's army, which had driven George Washington's army from New York City in the New York campaign.

=== Howe's plan to attack Philadelphia ===
On November 30, 1776, Howe—the British commander-in-chief in North America—wrote to Germain, outlining an ambitious plan for the 1777 campaign. Howe said that if Germain sent him substantial reinforcements, he could launch multiple offensives, including sending 10,000 men up the Hudson River to take Albany, New York. Then, in the autumn, Howe could move south and capture the U.S. capital of Philadelphia. Howe changed his mind soon after writing this letter: the reinforcements might not arrive, and the retreat of the Continental Army over the winter of 1776–77 made Philadelphia an increasingly vulnerable target. Therefore, Howe decided that he would make the capture of Philadelphia the primary object of the 1777 campaign. Howe sent Germain this revised plan, which Germain received on February 23, 1777.

=== Burgoyne's plan to capture Albany ===
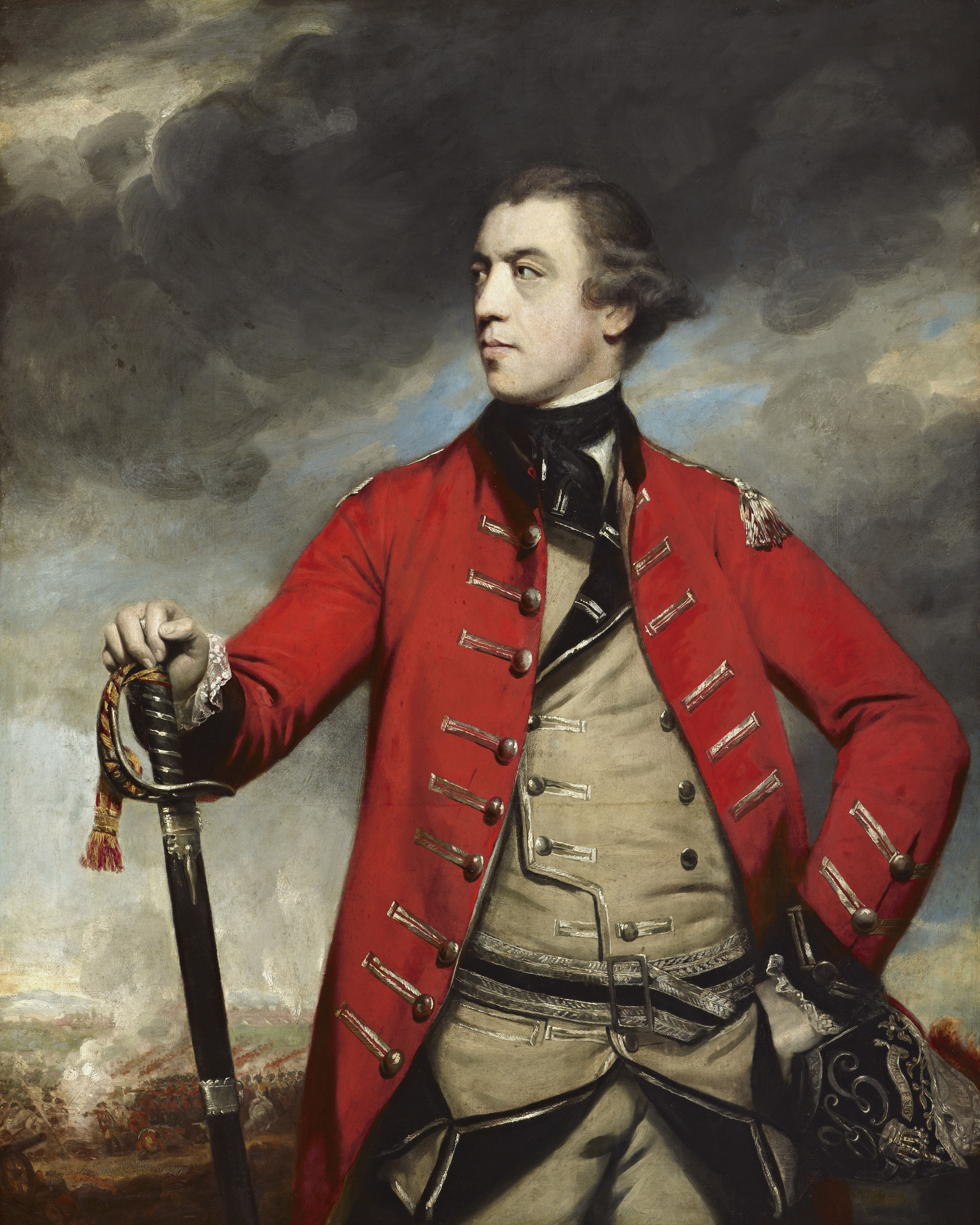
Portrait of John Burgoyne by Joshua Reynolds, 1766

Burgoyne, seeking to command a major force, proposed to isolate New England by an invasion from Quebec into New York. This had already been attempted by General Carleton in 1776, although he had stopped short of a full-scale invasion due to the lateness of the season. Carleton was heavily criticized in London for not taking advantage of the American retreat from Quebec, and he was also intensely disliked by Germain. This, combined with rival Henry Clinton's failed attempt to capture Charleston, South Carolina, placed Burgoyne in a good position to get command of the 1777 northern campaign. Burgoyne presented a written plan to Lord Germain on February 28, 1777; Germain approved it and gave Burgoyne command of the main expedition.

Burgoyne's invasion plan from Quebec had two components: he would lead the main force of about 8,000 men south from Montreal along Lake Champlain and the Hudson River Valley while a second column of about 2,000 men (which Barry St. Leger was chosen to lead), would move from Lake Ontario east down the Mohawk River valley in a strategic diversion. Both expeditions would converge upon Albany, where they would link up with troops from Howe's army, proceeding up the Hudson. Control of the Lake Champlain–Lake George–Hudson River route from Canada to New York City would cut off New England from the rest of the American colonies.

The last part of Burgoyne's proposal, the advance by Howe up the Hudson from New York City, proved to be the most controversial part of the campaign. Germain approved Burgoyne's plan after having received Howe's letter detailing his proposed offensive against Philadelphia. Whether Germain told Burgoyne, who was still in London at that time, about Howe's revised plans is unclear: while some sources claim he did, others state that Burgoyne was not notified of the changes until the campaign was well underway. Historian Robert Ketchum believes that Burgoyne would probably have been aware of the problems that lay ahead had he been notified of the Philadelphia plan.

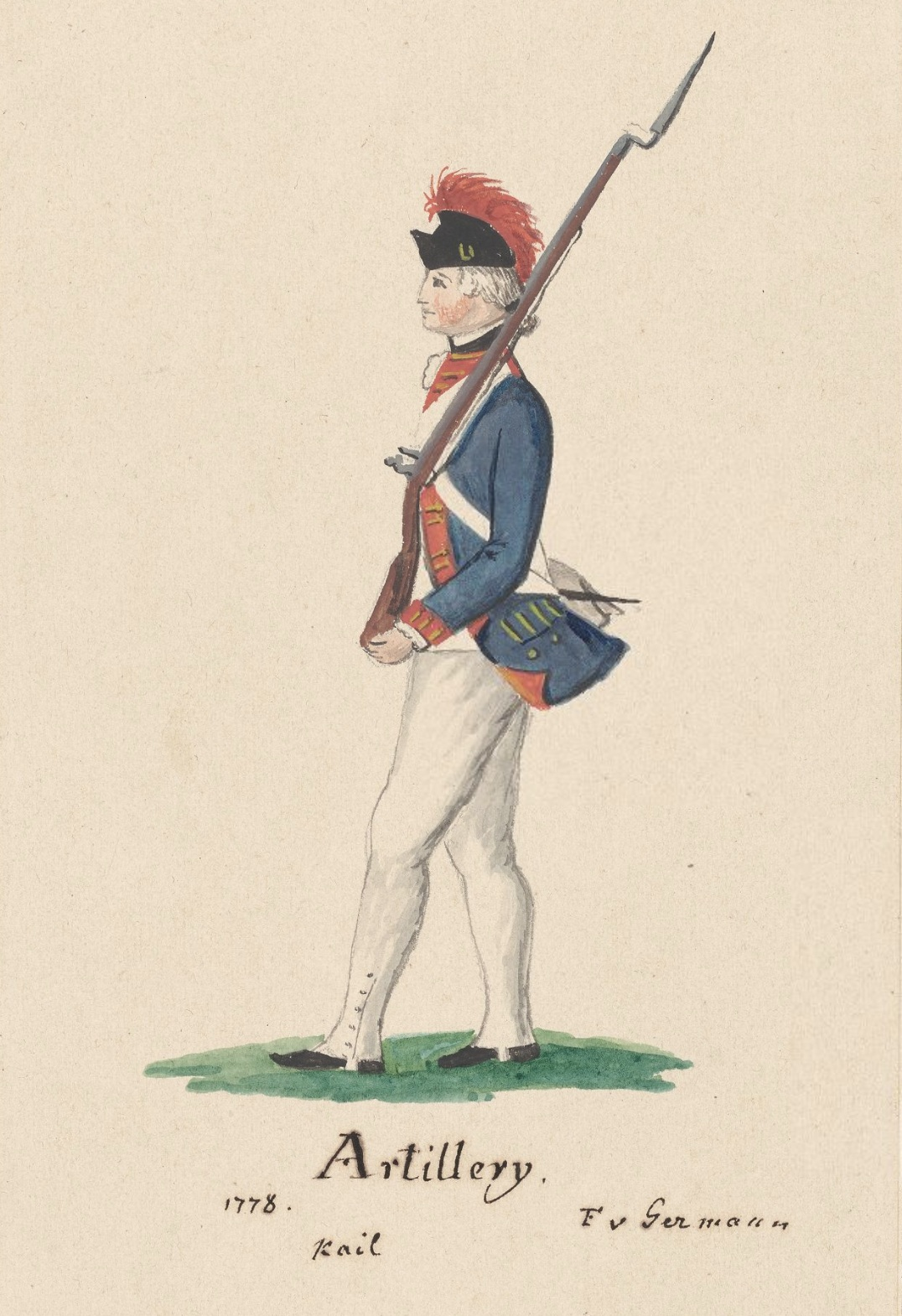
Illustration of a Royal Artillery soldier in Canada in 1777

Whether Germain, Howe, and Burgoyne had the same expectations about the degree to which Howe was supposed to support the invasion from Quebec is also unclear. What is clear is that Germain either left his generals with too much latitude or without a clearly defined overall strategy. In March 1777, Germain had approved of Howe's Philadelphia expedition and did not include any express orders for Howe to go to Albany. Yet Germain also sent Howe a copy of his instructions to Carleton, which plainly stated that the northern army was to make a junction with Howe's army at Albany. In a letter from Germain to Howe dated May 18, 1777, he made clear that the Philadelphia expedition should "be executed in time for you to co-operate with the army ordered to proceed from Canada and put itself under your command." This last letter, however, was not received by Howe until after he had departed New York for the Chesapeake. To attack Philadelphia Howe could either have moved overland through New Jersey or by sea via the Delaware Bay, both options would have kept him a position to aid Burgoyne if necessary. The final route he took, through the Chesapeake Bay, was immensely time-consuming and left him wholly unable to assist Burgoyne as Germain had envisioned. The decision was so difficult to understand that Howe's more hostile critics accused him of deliberate treachery.

Burgoyne returned to Quebec on May 6, 1777, bearing a letter from Lord Germain which introduced the plan but lacked some details. This produced another of the conflicts of command that plagued the British throughout the war. Lieutenant General Burgoyne technically outranked Major General Carleton, but Carleton was still the governor of Quebec. Germain's instructions to Burgoyne and Carleton had specifically limited Carleton's role to operations in Quebec. This slight against Carleton, combined with Carleton's failure to get command of the expedition, led to his resignation later in 1777, and to his refusal to supply troops from the Quebec regiments to garrison the forts at Crown Point and Ticonderoga after they were captured.

== American strategy ==
George Washington, whose army was encamped at Morristown, New Jersey, and the American military command did not have a good picture of British plans for 1777. The principal question on the minds of Washington and his generals Horatio Gates and Philip Schuyler—who both were at turns responsible for the Continental Army's Northern Department and its defense of the Hudson River—was of the movements of Howe's army in New York. They had no significant knowledge of what was being planned for the British forces in Quebec, in spite of Burgoyne's complaints that everyone in Montreal knew what he was planning. The three generals disagreed on what Burgoyne's most likely movement was, and Congress also rendered the opinion that Burgoyne's army was likely to move to New York by sea.

Partly as a result of this indecision, and the fact that the northern forts would be isolated from their supply lines if Howe moved north, the garrisons at Fort Ticonderoga and elsewhere in the Mohawk and Hudson valleys were not significantly increased. Schuyler took the measure in April 1777 of sending a large regiment under Colonel Peter Gansevoort to rehabilitate Fort Stanwix in the upper Mohawk valley as a step in defending against British movements in that area. Washington also ordered four regiments to be held at Peekskill, New York that could be directed either to the north or the south in response to British movements.

American troops were allocated throughout New York theater in June 1777. About 1,500 troops (including those of Colonel Gansevoort) were in outposts along the Mohawk River, about 3,000 troops were in the Hudson River highlands under the command of General Israel Putnam, and Schuyler commanded about 4,000 troops (inclusive of local militia and the troops at Ticonderoga under St. Clair).

== International interest ==
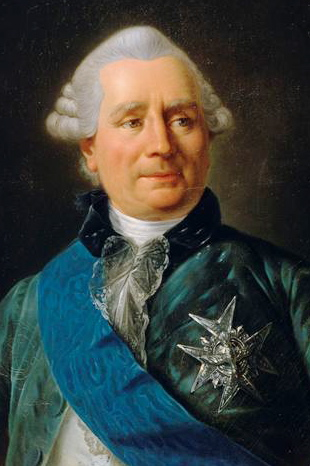
Charles Gravier, comte de Vergennes, portrait by Antoine-François Callet

Ever since the Seven Years' War, France's foreign ministers, beginning with Choiseul, had followed the idea that the independence of Britain's North American colonies would be beneficial for France, and furthermore that French attempts to recover parts of New France would be detrimental to that cause. When war broke out in 1775, the Comte de Vergennes, then the Foreign Minister, outlined a series of proposals that led to secret French and also Spanish support of Congress, and some preparations for the possibility of war, including expansion of their navies. Vergennes did not think open participation in the war was diplomatically or politically feasible until Washington's army demonstrated its strength and ability to gain military victories without significant assistance.

To further the aim of French participation in the war, Vergennes closely monitored news from North America and London, and worked to remove impediments to Spanish participation in the war. Vergennes went so far as to propose war to King Louis XVI in August 1776, but news of Howe's capture of New York City scuttled that plan.

== Campaign begins ==
Most of Burgoyne's army had arrived in Quebec in the spring of 1776 and participated in the routing of Continental Army troops from the province. In addition to British regulars, the troops in Quebec included several regiments from the German principalities of Hesse-Cassel, Hesse-Hanau (from whose name the common reference of Hessian comes) and Brunswick–Lüneburgers under the command of Baron Friedrich Adolph Riedesel. Of these regular forces, 200 British regulars and 300 to 400 Germans were assigned to St. Leger's Mohawk valley expedition, and about 3,500 men remained in Quebec to protect the province. The remaining forces were assigned to Burgoyne for the campaign to Albany. The regular forces were supposed to be augmented by as many as 2,000 militiamen raised in Quebec; by June, Carleton had managed to raise only three small companies. Burgoyne had also expected as many as 1,000 Indians to support the expedition. About 500 joined between Montreal and Crown Point.

Burgoyne's army was beset by transport difficulties before it left Quebec, something that apparently neither Burgoyne nor Carleton anticipated. As the expedition expected to travel mainly over water, there were few wagons, horses, and other draft animals available to move a large amount of equipment and supplies on the land portions of the route. Only in early June did Carleton issue orders to procure carts sufficient to move the army. Consequently, the carts were poorly constructed of green wood, and the teams were driven by civilians who were at a higher risk of desertion.

On June 13, 1777, Burgoyne and Carleton reviewed the assembled forces at St. John's on the Richelieu River, just north of Lake Champlain, and Burgoyne was ceremonially given command. In addition to five sailing ships built the previous year, a sixth had been built, and three had been captured after the Battle of Valcour Island. These provided some transport as well as military cover for the large fleet of transport boats that moved the army south on the lake.

The army that Burgoyne launched the next day had about 7,000 regulars and over 130 artillery pieces ranging from light mortars to 24-pound (11 kg) pieces. His regulars were organized into an advance force under Brigadier General Simon Fraser, and two divisions. Major General William Phillips led the 3,900 British regulars on the right, while Baron Riedesel's 3,100 Brunswick–Lüneburgers held the left. His regular troops started out in good condition, but some, notably some of the German dragoons, were poorly equipped for wilderness fighting.

Colonel St. Leger's expedition was also assembled by mid-June. His force, a mixed company of British regulars, Loyalists, Hessians, and rangers from the Indian department, numbering about 750 men left Lachine, near Montreal, on June 23.

== Ticonderoga falls ==
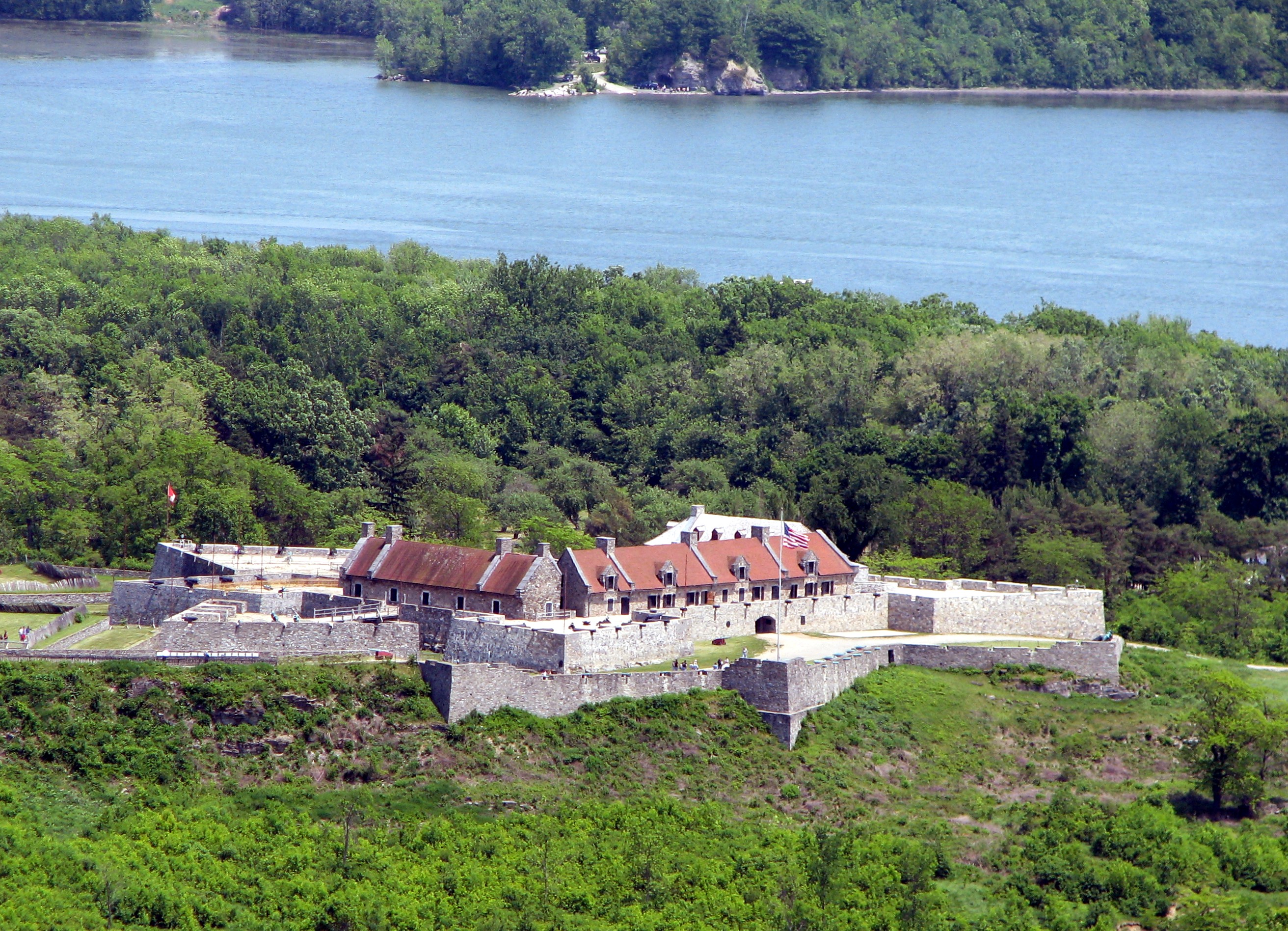
Fort Ticonderoga from Mount Defiance

Burgoyne's army traveled up the lake and occupied the undefended Fort Crown Point by June 30. The screening activities of Burgoyne's Indian support were highly effective at keeping the Americans from learning the details of his movements. General Arthur St. Clair, who had been left in command of Fort Ticonderoga and its surrounding defenses with a garrison of about 3,000 regulars and militia, had no idea on July 1 of the full strength of Burgoyne's army, large elements of which were then just 4 miles (6.4 km) away. St. Clair had been ordered by General Schuyler to hold out as long as possible, and had planned two avenues of retreat.

Open skirmishing began on the outer defense works of Ticonderoga on July 2. By July 4, most of the American garrison was either at Fort Ticonderoga or nearby Mount Independence, the extensive fortifications on the Vermont side of the lake. Unknown to the Americans, their withdrawal from an outer defensive position cleared a way for the British to place artillery on the hilltop known then as Sugar Loaf (now Mount Defiance), whose heights commanded the fort. St. Clair withdrew the night after spotting British cannon on Sugar Loaf on July 5, and Burgoyne's men occupied the main fortification and the positions on Mount Independence on July 6. The uncontested surrender of the supposedly impregnable fort caused a public and political uproar. Although a later investigation cleared both Schuyler and St. Clair of any wrongdoing in the withdrawal, it caused the Continental Congress to replace Schuyler with General Horatio Gates as commander of the Northern Department of the Continental Army in August.

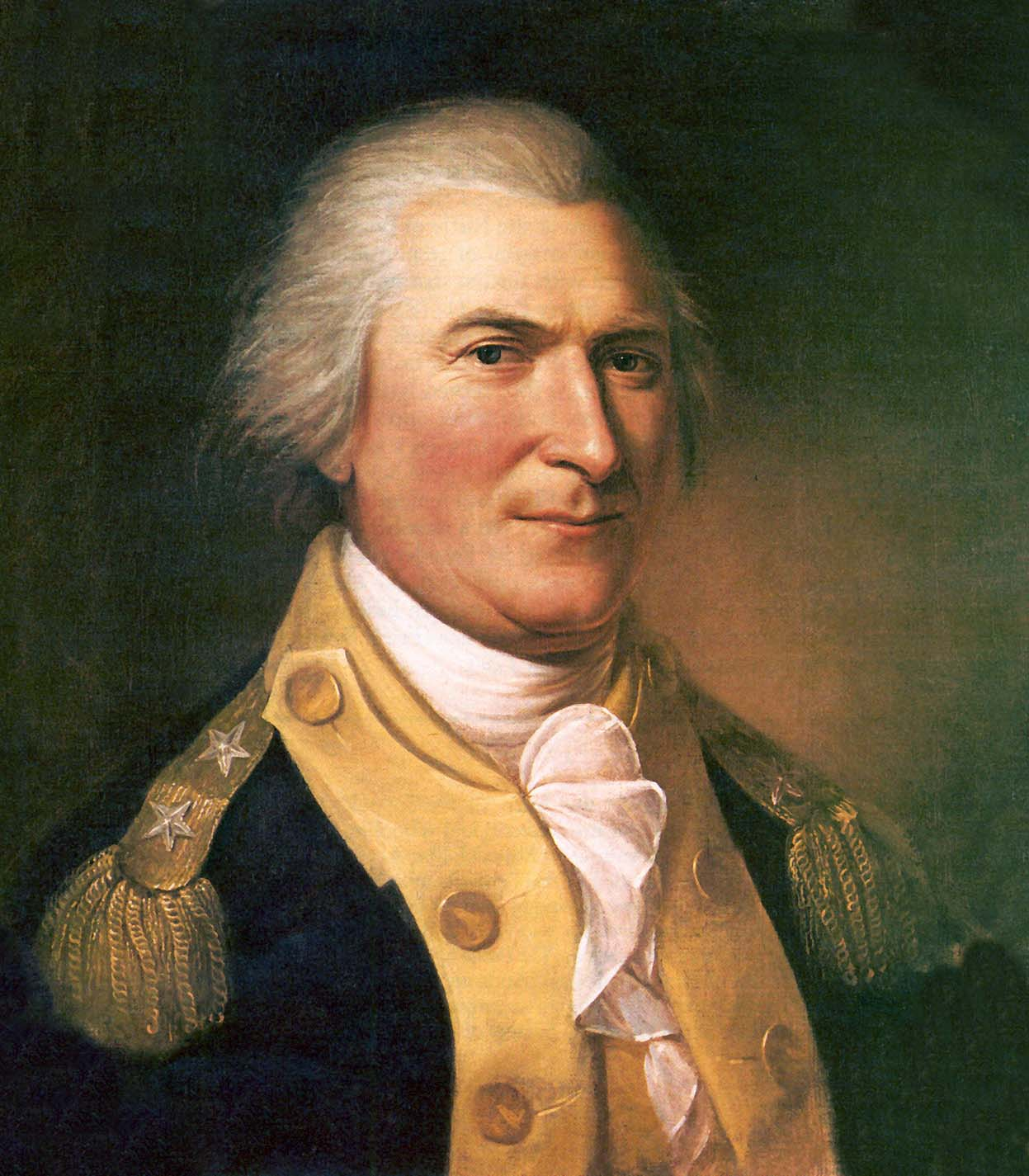
General Arthur St. Clair, portrait by Charles Willson Peale

Burgoyne sent forces out from his main body to pursue the retreating army, which St. Clair had sent south via two different routes. The British caught up with elements of the retreating Americans at least three times. General Fraser and elements of Riedesel's troops faced determined resistance in Battle of Hubbardton on July 7, and that same day the vanguard of the main army met Pierse Long's retreating companies in a skirmish at Skenesboro (now Whitehall). These were followed by another standoff in the Battle of Fort Anne on July 8, in which a forward company of the British army was nearly decimated. These actions cost the Americans about 50% more casualties than those incurred by the British, and they demonstrated to the British officers present that the Americans were capable of putting up stiff resistance. Burgoyne's army was reduced by about 1,500 men as a result of the Ticonderoga actions. He left 400 men to garrison the magazine at Crown Point and another 900 to defend Ticonderoga, and the battles that followed resulted in about 200 casualties.

The bulk of St. Clair's army retreated through the New Hampshire Grants (present-day Vermont). St. Clair issued appeals to the states for militia support, and also arranged to have as much of the area's livestock and supplies delivered to Fort Edward on the Hudson River, where the American armies would regroup. St. Clair reached Fort Edward on July 12 after five days of grueling marches. Some of the remnants that had been scattered at Hubbardton rejoined the army, but Seth Warner and the remains of his regiment were stationed at Manchester in the Grants.

== Reaction and delay ==
Burgoyne settled into the house of Loyalist Philip Skene at Skenesboro while the pieces of his army regrouped and he considered his next steps. He penned letters describing the British victory, intended for public consumption. When this news reached the capitals of Europe, King George was happy, and the Comte de Vergennes was not, as the news effectively scuttled an early proposal for French entry into the war. British diplomats increased pressure on the French and Spanish, demanding that they close their ports to American shipping. While this demand was refused, it markedly increased the tensions between the powers. The news was also harshly received by Congress and the American public, including slanders that St. Clair and Schuyler had been bribed.

On July 10, Burgoyne issued orders for the next series of movements. Most of the army was to take the rough road from Skenesboro to Fort Edward via Fort Anne, while the heavy artillery was to be transported down Lake George to Fort William Henry, and then over land to Ft. Edward. Riedesel's troops were sent back up the road toward Castleton, primarily as a diversion intended to suggest that he might be aiming for the Connecticut River. Burgoyne's decision to move the army overland via Fort Anne was a curious one, for it contradicted his own earlier commentaries on planning the expedition, in which he presciently observed that defenders could easily block the route. His decision appears to have been motivated by two factors; the first being the perception that moving the army over water via Lake George would require a retrograde movement that could be perceived as a retreat, and the second being the influence of Philip Skene, whose property would benefit by the improved road Burgoyne would have to build.

General Schuyler, at Albany when he received word of Ticonderoga's fall, immediately rode to Fort Edward, where there was a garrison of about 700 regulars and 1,400 militia. He decided to make Burgoyne's passage as difficult as possible, using the axe as a weapon; as it was much easier to fell large trees in the enemy's path than to remove them after they were down, this brought Burgoyne's advance to a crawl, tiring his troops and forcing them to use up supplies. On July 11 Burgoyne wrote to Lord Germain, complaining that the Americans were systematically felling trees, destroying bridges, and damming streams along the road to Fort Edward. Schuyler also employed scorched earth tactics to deny the British access to local provisions. Despite Burgoyne's lack of movement, his scouts were active; some of Schuyler's work crews were attacked.

Schuyler's tactics required Burgoyne to build a road through the wilderness for his guns and troops, a task that took about two weeks. They moved out of Skenesboro on July 24 and reached Fort Edward on July 29, finding that Schuyler had already abandoned it in a retreat that ended at Stillwater, New York. Before he left Skenesboro, Burgoyne was joined by about 500 Indians (mostly Odawas, but also Meskwaki, Mississauga, Chippewa, and Ojibwe, as well as members of the Haudenosaunee) from the Great Lakes region under the leadership of St. Luc de la Corne and Charles Michel de Langlade.

== St. Leger's expedition ==
Lieutenant Colonel St. Leger proceeded up the St. Lawrence by bateaux and crossed Lake Ontario to arrive at Oswego without incident. He had about 240 British regulars, supported by 90 jäger from Hesse-Hanau, 250 Loyalists from the King's Royal Regiment of New York, and 50 Canadien militia. They were joined by 100 British Indian Department rangers led by John Butler, and 800 indigenous warriors led by the Haudenosaunee war chiefs Sayenqueraghta, Cornplanter, and Joseph Brant.

Burgoyne's march on Albany June–October 1777

Leaving Oswego on July 26, the expedition marched to Fort Stanwix on the Mohawk River, and began besieging it on August 2. About 800 members of the Tryon County militia and their Oneida allies marched to relieve the siege, but a detachment of St. Leger's force ambushed them on August 6 at the Battle of Oriskany. After several hours of fighting, St. Leger's force abandoned their attack. This left the Americans holding the field of battle, however, they were also forced to withdraw because of the catastrophic casualties they had suffered, including the mortal wounding of their leader, Brigadier General Nicholas Herkimer.

Warriors from the Haudenosaunee nations fought on both sides of the battle, marking the beginning of a civil war within the Six Nations. During the Oriskany action, the besieged Americans staged a sortie from Fort Stanwix and raided the nearly empty indigenous camp. This, combined with the significant casualties they suffered at Oriskany, was a major blow to the morale of St. Leger's native allies.

On August 10, Benedict Arnold left Stillwater, New York for Fort Stanwix with 800 men of the Continental Army from Schuyler's Northern Department. He expected to recruit members of the Tryon County militia when he arrived at Fort Dayton on August 21. Arnold, however, could only raise about 100 men, as most of the militiamen who had been at Oriskany refused to participate. Arnold instead resorted to subterfuge. He staged the escape of a Loyalist captive, who convinced St. Leger that Arnold was coming with a much larger force than he actually had.

Upon receiving this news, St. Leger's indigenous allies withdrew and took most of the remaining supplies with them. St. Leger was forced to abandon the siege and head back through Oswego to Quebec. Arnold sent a detachment to Oneida Lake in pursuit, but turned the rest of his force east to rejoin the American forces at Saratoga. St. Leger eventually arrived with elements of his expedition at Fort Ticonderoga on September 27. Their arrival was too late to effectively support Burgoyne, whose army was already being hemmed in by the growing American forces around him.

== Mounting difficulties ==
The advance of Burgoyne's army to Fort Edward was, as with the approach to Ticonderoga, preceded by a wave of Indians, which chased away the small contingent of troops left there by Schuyler. These allies became impatient and began indiscriminate raids on frontier families and settlements, which had the effect of increasing rather than reducing local support to the American rebels. In particular, the death at Indian hands of the young Loyalist settler Jane McCrea was widely publicized and served as a catalyst for rebel support, as Burgoyne's decision not to punish the perpetrators was seen as unwillingness or inability to keep the Indians under control.

Even though the bulk of his army made the trip from Skenesboro to Fort Edward in just five days, the army's lack of adequate transport served to delay the army again, as the supply train, hampered by a lack of draft animals and carts and wagons that were capable of dealing with the rough tracks through the wilderness, took time to follow.

On August 3, messengers from General Howe finally succeeded in making their way through the American lines to Burgoyne's camp at Fort Edward. (Numerous attempts by the British generals to communicate were frustrated by the capture and hanging of their messengers by the Americans.) The messengers did not bring good news. On July 17, Howe wrote that he was preparing to depart by sea with his army to capture Philadelphia, and that General Clinton, responsible for New York City's defense, would "act as occurrences may direct". Burgoyne refused to divulge the contents of this dispatch to his staff.

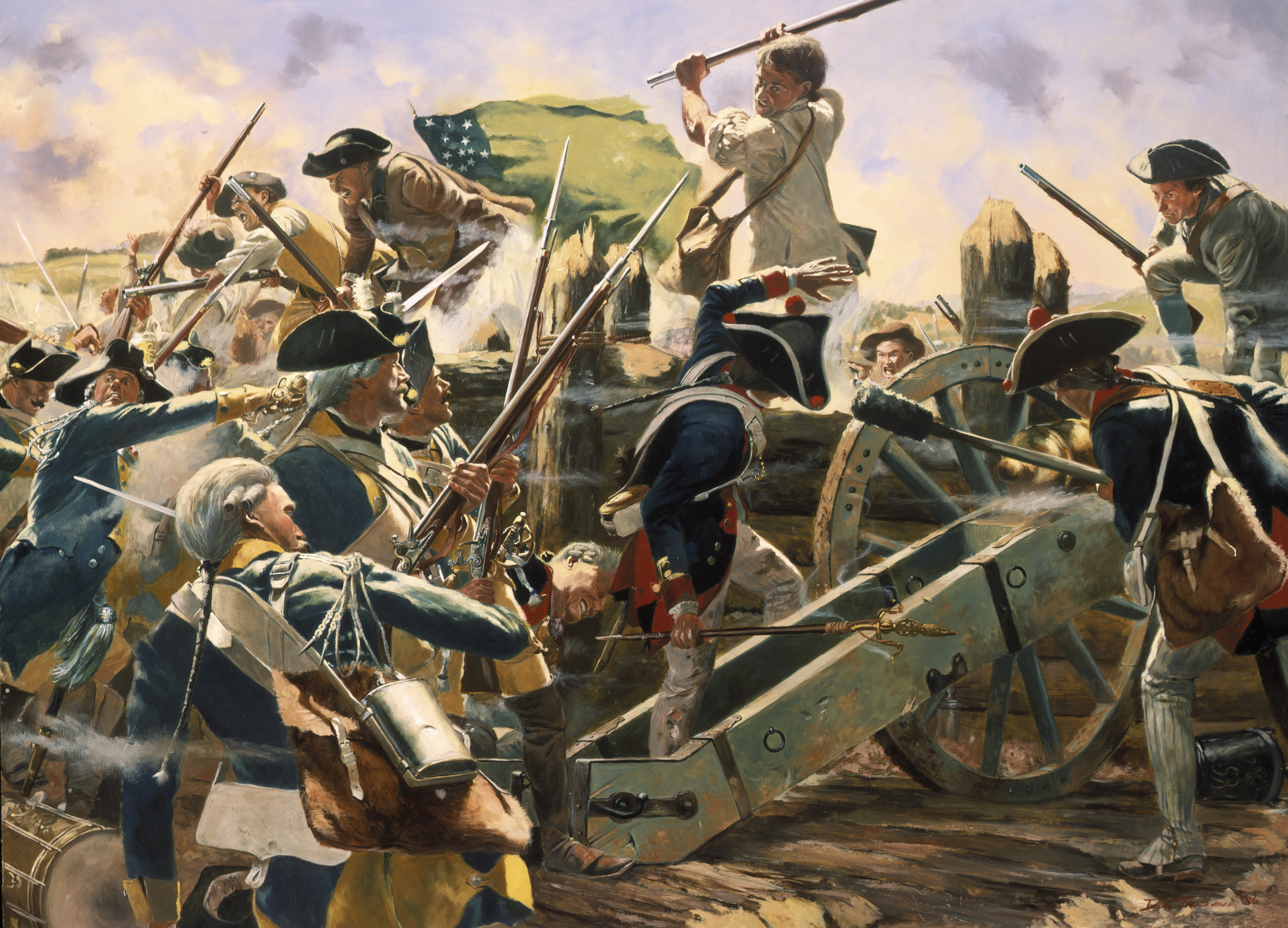
The Battle of Bennington

Realizing that he now had a serious supply problem, Burgoyne decided to act on a suggestion that Riedesel had made to him in July. Riedesel, whose forces Burgoyne had stationed at Castleton for a time while he was at Skenesboro, had observed that the area was rich in draft animals and horses, which might be seized for the army's benefit (including the mounting of Riedesel's currently unmounted dragoons). Pursuing this idea, Burgoyne sent Colonel Friedrich Baum's regiment to obtain supplies from the armory in Bennington, Vermont on August 9, along with some Brunswick dragoons. Most of Baum's detachment never returned from the August 16 Battle of Bennington, and the reinforcements he had sent after them came back after they were ravaged in the same battle, which deprived Burgoyne of nearly 1,000 men and the much-needed supplies. What Burgoyne had been unaware of was that St. Clair's calls for militia support following the withdrawal from Ticonderoga had been answered, and General John Stark had placed 2,000 men at Bennington. Stark's force enveloped Baum's at Bennington, killing him and capturing much of his detachment.

The death of Jane McCrea and the Battle of Bennington, besides acting as rallying cries for the Americans, had another important effect. Burgoyne blamed his Indian and Canadian allies for McCrea's death, and, even after the Indians had lost 80 of their number at Bennington, Burgoyne showed them no gratitude. As a result, Langlade, La Corne, and most of the Indians left the British camp, leaving Burgoyne with fewer than 100 Indian scouts. Burgoyne was left with no protection in the woods against the American rangers. Burgoyne would later blame La Corne for deserting him, while La Corne countered that Burgoyne never respected the Indians. In the British Parliament, Lord Germain sided with La Corne.

== American change of fortune ==
While the tactic of delay worked well in the field, the result in the Continental Congress was a different matter. General Horatio Gates was in Philadelphia when Congress discussed its shock at the fall of Ticonderoga, and Gates was more than willing to help assign the blame to reluctant generals. Some in the Congress had already been impatient with General George Washington, wanting a large, direct confrontation that might eliminate occupation forces but which Washington feared would probably lose the war. John Adams, the head of the War Committee, praised Gates and remarked that "we shall never hold a post until we shoot a general." Over the objections of the New York delegation, Congress sent Gates to take command of the Northern Department on August 10. It also ordered states from Pennsylvania to Massachusetts to call out their militias. On August 19, Gates arrived at Albany to take charge. He was cold and arrogant in manner, and pointedly excluded Schuyler from his first war council. Schuyler left for Philadelphia shortly after, depriving Gates of his intimate knowledge of the area.

Throughout August and continuing into September, militia companies arrived at the Continental Army camps on the Hudson. These were augmented by troops Washington ordered north from the Hudson Highlands as part of General Arnold's operation to relieve Stanwix. Those troops arrived at the end of August and included the crack sharpshooters of Daniel Morgan's rifle corps, which he sent north from his own army. News of the American successes at Bennington and Fort Stanwix, combined with outrage over the death of Jane McCrea, rallied support, swelling Gates' army to over 6,000 rank and file. This number did not include Stark's small army at Bennington, which was reduced in size by disease and the departure of some of its companies, but was also augmented by several hundred troops raised by General Benjamin Lincoln, who was assigned to make attacks against Burgoyne's supply and communications.

== Saratoga ==
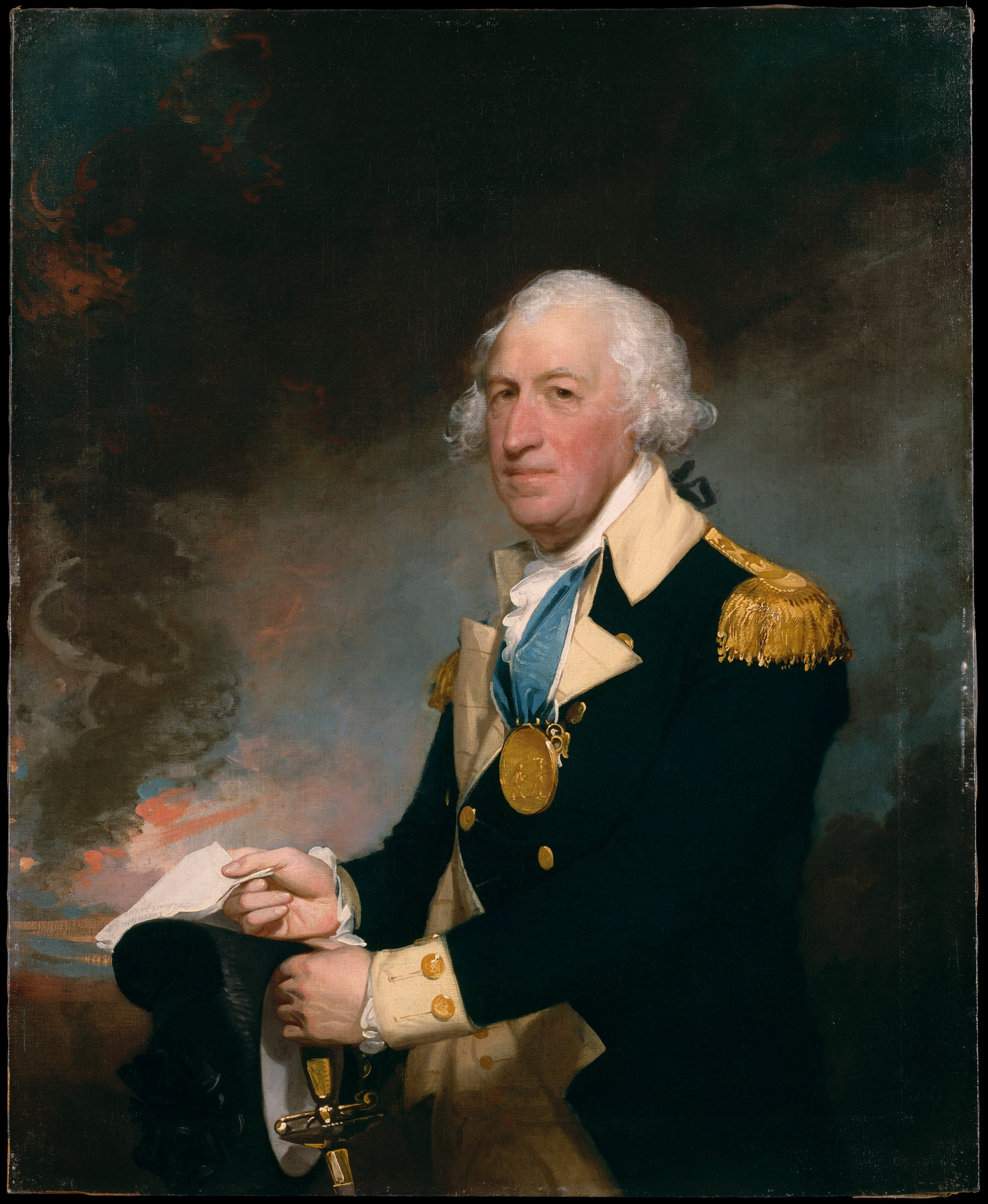
Portrait of Horatio Gates by Gilbert Stuart, 1794

The "Battle of Saratoga" is often depicted as a single event, but it was actually a month-long series of maneuvers punctuated by two battles. At the beginning of September 1777, Burgoyne's army, now just over 7,000 strong, was located on the east bank of the Hudson. He had learned of St. Leger's failure at Stanwix on August 28, and even earlier that Howe would not be giving him substantial support from New York City. Faced with the need to reach defensible winter quarters, which would require either retreat back to Ticonderoga or advance to Albany, he decided on the latter. Subsequent to this decision, he made two further crucial decisions. He decided to deliberately cut communications to the north so that he would not need to maintain a chain of heavily fortified outposts between his position and Ticonderoga, and he decided to cross the Hudson River while he was in a relatively strong position. He therefore ordered Riedesel, whose forces were in the rear, to abandon outposts from Skenesboro south, and ordered the army to cross the river just north of Saratoga, (now Schuylerville), which it did between September 13 and 15. Moving cautiously, since the departure of his Indian support had deprived him of reliable scouting, Burgoyne advanced to the south. On September 18 the vanguard of his army had reached a position just north of Saratoga, about 4 miles (6.4 km) from the American defensive line, and skirmishes occurred between the leading elements of the armies.

When Gates took over Schuyler's army, much of it was located near the mouth of the Mohawk River, south of Stillwater. On September 8, he ordered the army, then about 10,000 men (of whom about 8,500 were effective combat troops), to Stillwater with the idea of setting up defenses there. The Polish engineer Tadeusz Kościuszko found the area inadequate for proper defensive works, so a new location was found about three miles further north (and about 10 miles (16 km) south of Saratoga). At this location Kosciusko laid out defensive lines stretching from the river to the bluffs called Bemis Heights.

The right side of these defenses was nominally given to General Lincoln, but as he was leading troops intended for a diversion against Ticonderoga, Gates assumed command of that portion of the line himself. Gates put General Arnold, with whom he had previously had a good relationship, in command of the army's left, the western defenses on Bemis Heights. The relationship between the two soured when Arnold chose to staff his command with friends of Schuyler, whom Gates hated. Combined with the prickly natures of both Gates and Arnold, this eventually brought internal power squabbles to a boil.

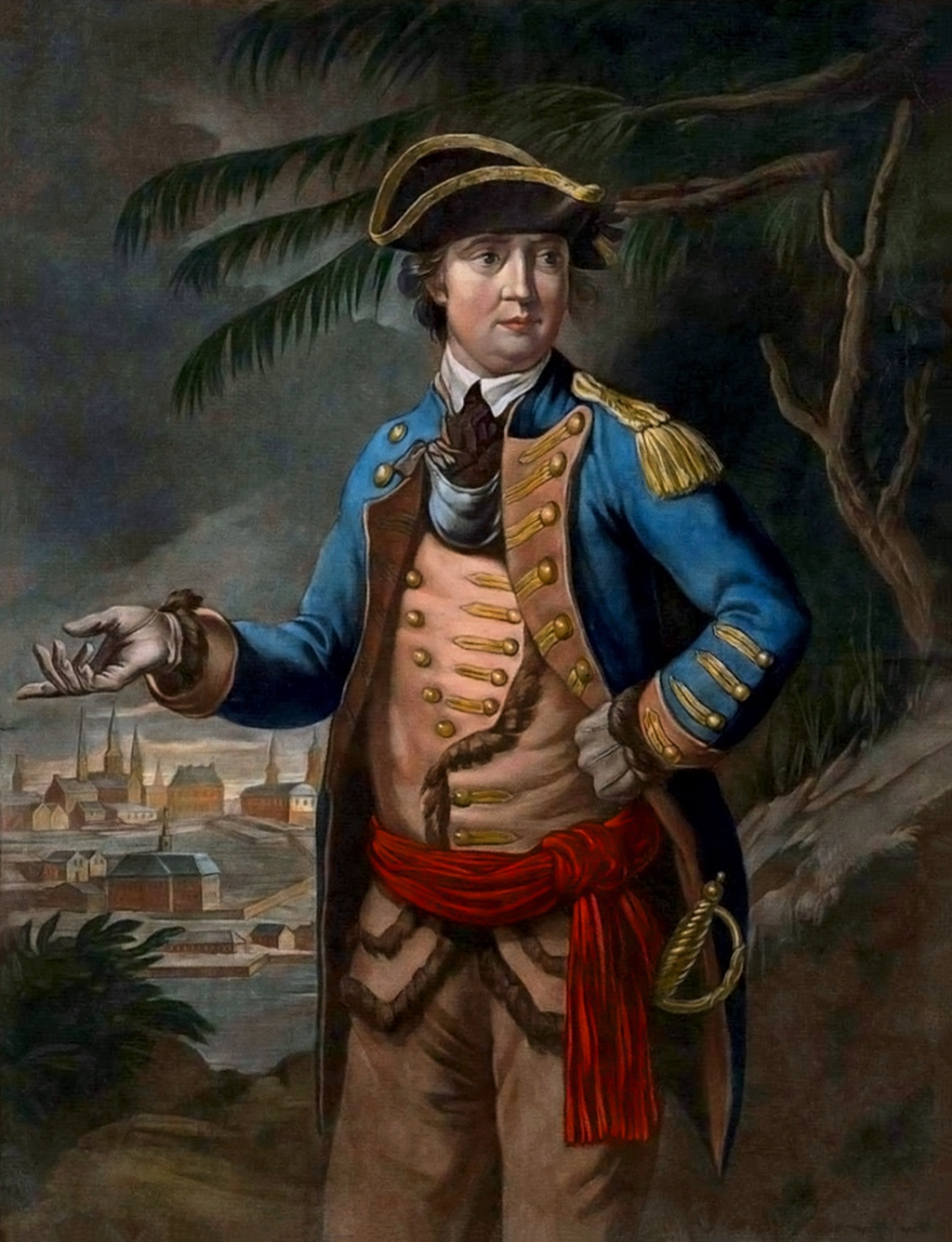
Artist's conception of General Benedict Arnold, color mezzotint by Thomas Hart

=== Freeman's Farm ===
Both Generals Burgoyne and Arnold recognized the importance of the American left flank. Burgoyne recognized that the American position could be flanked and divided his forces, sending a large detachment to the west on September 19. Arnold, also recognizing that a British attack on the left was likely, asked Gates for permission to move his forces out to Freeman's Farm to anticipate that maneuver. Gates refused to carry out a general movement since he wanted to wait behind his defenses for the expected frontal attack; but he did permit Arnold to send Daniel Morgan's riflemen and some light infantry out for a reconnaissance in force. These forces precipitated the Battle of Freeman's Farm when they made contact with Burgoyne's right flank. In the ensuing battle, the British gained control of Freeman's Farm, but at the cost of 600 casualties, ten percent of their forces.

After the battle, the feud between Gates and Arnold erupted. Not only did Gates not mention Arnold at all in the official account of the battle he sent to Congress, but he also transferred Morgan's company (which had been technically independent but operated under Arnold's command in the battle) to his direct command. Arnold and Gates had a noisy argument in Gates' quarters, in which Gates said that General Lincoln would be replacing him. Following the argument, Arnold drafted a letter to Gates outlining his grievances and requesting a transfer to Washington's command. Gates gave Arnold a pass to leave and continued to inflict petty indignities on Arnold. A commonly referenced reason why Arnold chose to remain is that a petition signed by all of the line officers except Gates and Lincoln convinced him to stay. While proposals for such a document were considered, there is no contemporary evidence of one actually being drafted and signed.

Burgoyne considered renewing the attack the next day but called it off when Fraser noted that many men were fatigued from the previous day's exertions. He therefore dug his army in, and waited for news that he would receive some assistance from the south, as a letter he received from General Clinton in New York on September 21 suggested that a movement up the Hudson would draw off some of Gates' army. Although he was aware of the persistent desertions that were reducing the size of his army and that the army was running short of food and other critical supplies, he did not know that the American army was also daily growing in size, or that Gates had intelligence on how dire the situation was in his camp.

=== Attack on Ticonderoga ===
Unknown to either side at Saratoga until after the battle, General Lincoln and Colonel John Brown had staged an attack against the British position at Fort Ticonderoga. Lincoln had collected 2,000 men at Bennington by early September. After marching north to Pawlet, they received word that the guard at Ticonderoga might be susceptible to surprise. Lincoln sent three detachments of 500 men each to "annoy, divide, and distract the enemy." One went to Skenesboro, which was found to be abandoned by the British. The second went to capture Mount Independence on the east side of Lake Champlain, while the third, led by John Brown, made the approach to Ticonderoga.

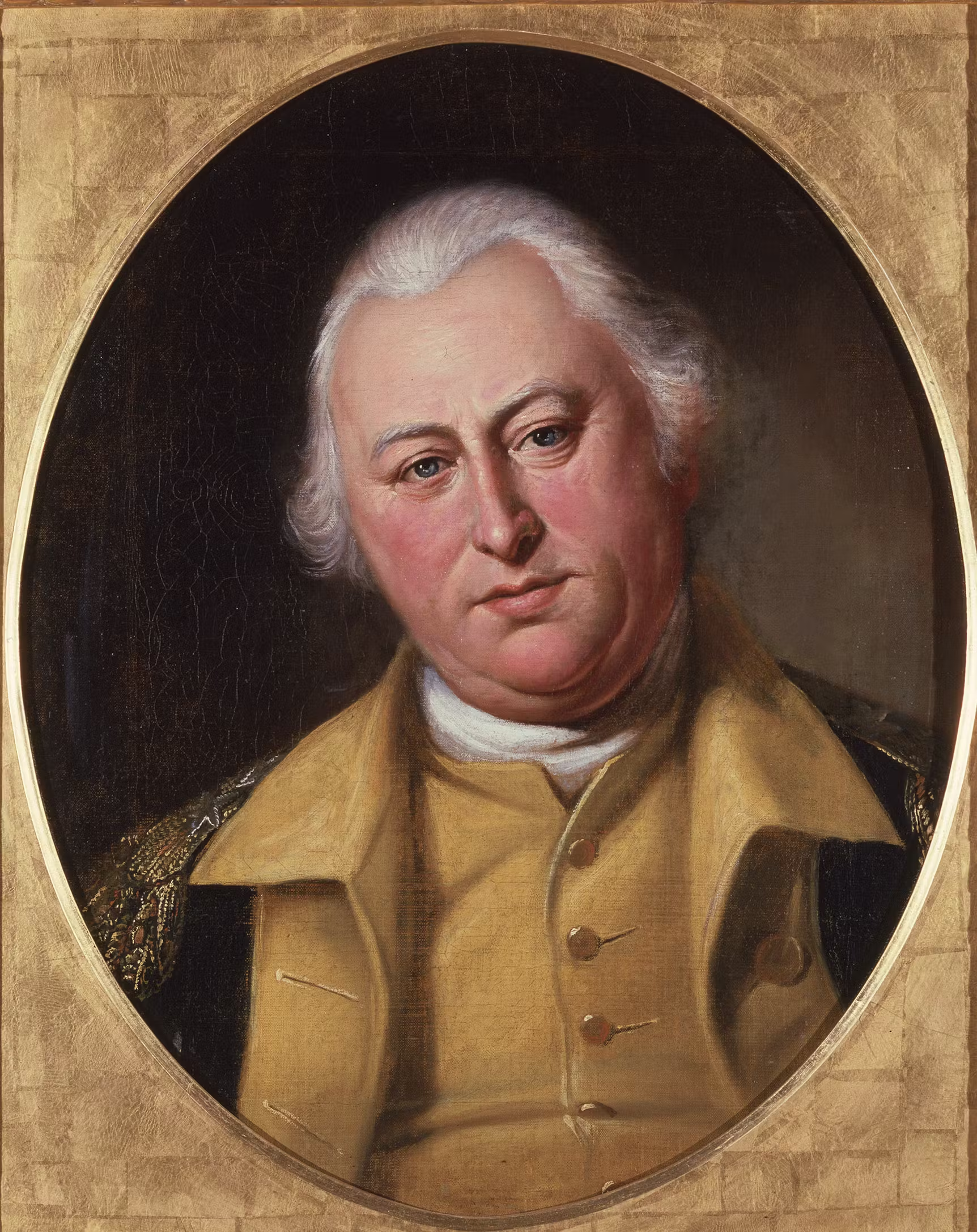
General Benjamin Lincoln, portrait by Charles Willson Peale

On the morning of September 18, Brown surprised the British defenders at the southern end of the portage trail connecting Lake George to Lake Champlain. Rapidly moving up the trail, his men continued to surprise British defenders and capture artillery pieces until they reached the height of land just before Ticonderoga, where they occupied the "old French lines" (so named because it was there that a French defense improbably held against a much larger British army in the 1758 Battle of Carillon). On the way he rescued 100 American prisoners (thus increasing the size of his force) and captured nearly 300 British. His demand for the fort's surrender was refused, and Brown's men and the fort exchanged cannon fire for the next four days, to little effect. Since he had insufficient manpower to actually assault the fort, Brown then withdrew to Lake George, where he made an unsuccessful attempt to capture a storage depot on an island in the lake.

General Gates wrote to Lincoln on the day of Freeman's Farm, ordering his force back to Saratoga and that "not one moment should be lost". Lincoln reached Bemis Heights on September 22, but the last of his troops did not arrive until the 29th.

=== Sir Henry Clinton attempts a diversion ===
General Howe, when he left New York for Philadelphia, had put General Sir Henry Clinton in charge of New York's defense, with instructions to assist Burgoyne if opportunities arose. Clinton wrote to Burgoyne on September 12 that he would "make a push at [Fort] Montgomery in about ten days" if "you think 2000 men can assist you effectually." When Burgoyne received the letter, he immediately replied, appealing to Clinton for instruction on whether he should attempt to advance or retreat, based on the likelihood of Clinton's arrival at Albany for support. Burgoyne indicated that if he did not receive a response by October 12, he would be forced to retreat.

On October 3, Clinton sailed up the Hudson River with 3,000 men and on October 6, one day after receiving Burgoyne's appeal, captured the highland forts named Clinton and Montgomery. Burgoyne never received Clinton's dispatches following this victory, as all three messengers were captured. Clinton followed up the victory by dismantling the chain across the Hudson and sending a raiding force up the river that reached as far north as Livingston Manor on October 16 before turning back. General Schuyler found a spot alongside the Hudson River to build a garrison house where the Indians had a few settlements. This housing area resulted in the Indians losing this fishing ground. Word of Clinton's movements only reached Gates after the Battle of Bemis Heights.

=== Bemis Heights ===
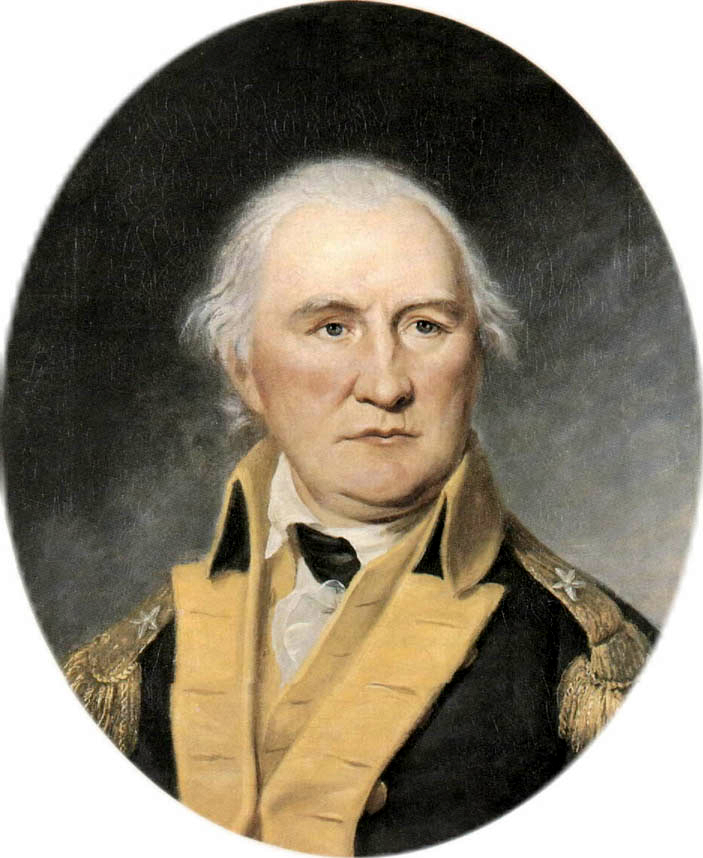
General Daniel Morgan, portrait by Charles Willson Peale

In addition to Lincoln's 2,000 men, militia units poured into the American camp, swelling the American army to over 15,000 men. Burgoyne, who had put his army on short rations on October 3, called a council the next day. The decision of this meeting was to launch a reconnaissance in force of about 1,700 men toward the American left flank. Burgoyne and Fraser led this detachment out early on the afternoon of October 7. Their movements were spotted, and Gates wanted to order only Daniel Morgan's men out in opposition. Arnold said that this was clearly insufficient and that a large force had to be sent. Gates, put off one last time by Arnold's tone, dismissed him, saying, "You have no business here." However, Gates did accede to similar advice given by Lincoln. In addition to sending Morgan's company around the British right, he also sent Enoch Poor's brigade against Burgoyne's left. When Poor's men made contact, the Battle of Bemis Heights was underway.

The initial American attack was highly effective, and Burgoyne attempted to order a withdrawal, but his aide was shot down before the order could be broadcast. In intense fighting, the flanks of Burgoyne's force were exposed, while the Brunswick–Lüneburgers at the center held against Learned's determined attack. General Fraser was mortally wounded in this phase of the battle. While frequently claimed to be the work of Timothy Murphy, one of Morgan's men, the story appears to be a 19th-century fabrication. After Fraser's fall and the arrival of additional American troops, Burgoyne ordered what was left of the force to retreat behind their entrenched lines.

General Arnold, frustrated by the sound of fighting he was not involved in, rode off from the American headquarters to join the fray. Arnold, who some claimed was in a drunken fury, took the battle to the British position. The right side of the British line consisted of two earthen redoubts that had been erected on Freeman's Farm, and were manned by Brunswick–Lüneburgers under Heinrich von Breymann and light infantry under Lord Balcarres. Arnold first rallied troops to attack Balcarres' redoubt, without success. He then boldly rode through the gap between the two redoubts, a space guarded by a small company of Canadian irregulars. Learned's men followed and made an assault on the open rear of Breymann's redoubt. Arnold's horse was shot out from under him, pinning him and breaking his leg. Breymann was killed in the fierce action, and his position was taken. However, night was falling, and the battle came to an end. The battle was a bloodbath for Burgoyne's troops: nearly 900 men were killed, wounded, or captured, compared to about 150 for the Americans.

== Surrender ==
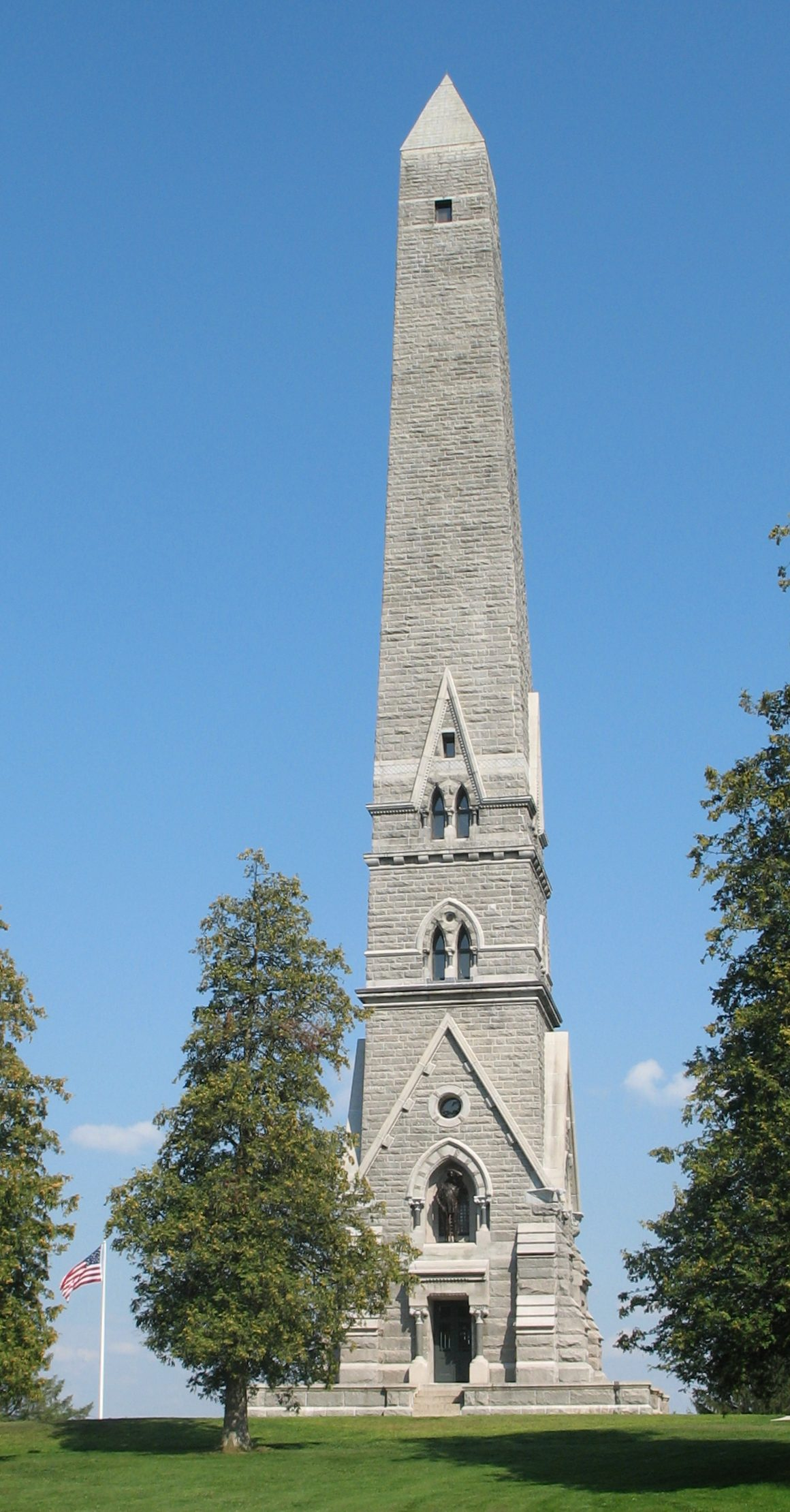
Monument at Victory, New York

Simon Fraser died of his wounds early the next day, and was buried at sunset the following day. Burgoyne ordered the army, whose entrenchments had been subjected to persistent harassment by the Americans, to retreat. One consequence of the skirmishing was that General Lincoln was also wounded. Combined with Arnold's wounds, this deprived Gates of his top two field commanders.

Facing heavy rains and probes against the column by the Continental Army, it took the British Army nearly two days to reach Saratoga. Burgoyne was aided by logistical problems in the American camp, where delays in bringing forward and issuing rations hampered the army's ability to move forward. Gates ordered detachments to take positions on the east side of the Hudson River to oppose any attempted crossings. By the morning of October 13 Burgoyne's army was completely surrounded, so his council voted to open negotiations. Terms were agreed on October 16 that Burgoyne insisted on calling a "convention" rather than a capitulation.

Baroness Riedesel, wife of the commander of the Brunswick–Lüneburg troops, vividly describes in her journal the confusion and besetting starvation of the retreating British army. Her account of the tribulation and death of officers and men, and of the terrified women who had taken shelter in the cellar of what later became known as the Marshall House dramatizes the desperation of the besieged army.

On October 17, Burgoyne's army surrendered with full honours of war. Burgoyne gave his sword to Gates, who immediately returned it as a sign of respect. Burgoyne's army, about 6,000 strong, marched past to stack arms as the American and British bands played "Yankee Doodle" and "The British Grenadiers".

== Aftermath ==
British troops withdrew from Ticonderoga and Crown Point in November, and Lake Champlain was free of British troops by early December. American troops, on the other hand, still had work to do. Alerted to General Clinton's raids on the Hudson, most of the army marched south toward Albany on October 18, while other detachments accompanied the "Convention Army" east. Burgoyne and Riedesel became guests of General Schuyler, who had come north from Albany to witness the surrender. Burgoyne was allowed to return to England on parole in May 1778, where he spent the next two years defending his actions in Parliament and the press. He was eventually exchanged for more than 1,000 American prisoners.

In response to Burgoyne's surrender, Congress declared December 18, 1777, as a national day "for solemn Thanksgiving and praise" in recognition of the military success at Saratoga; it was the nation's first official observance of a holiday with that name.

=== Convention Army ===
Under the terms of the convention, Burgoyne's army was to march to Boston, where British ships would transport it back to England, on condition that its members not participate in the conflict until they were formally exchanged. Congress demanded that Burgoyne provide a list of troops in the army so that the terms of the agreement concerning future combat could be enforced. When he refused, Congress decided not to honor the terms of the convention, and the army remained in captivity. The army was kept for some time in sparse camps throughout New England. Although individual officers were exchanged, much of the "Convention Army" was eventually marched south to Virginia, where it remained prisoner for several years. Throughout its captivity, a large number of men (more than 1,300 in the first year alone) escaped and effectively deserted, settling in the United States.

== Consequences ==
Erected 1887 By

JOHN WATTS de PEYSTER
Brev: Maj: Gen: S.N.Y.
2nd V. Pres't Saratoga Mon't Ass't'n:
In memory of
the most brilliant soldier of the
Continental Army
who was desperately wounded
on this spot the sally port of
BORGOYNES GREAT WESTERN REDOUBT
7th October, 1777
winning for his countrymen
the decisive battle of the
American Revolution
and for himself the rank of

Major General

— Inscription on the Boot Monument

On December 4, 1777, word reached Benjamin Franklin at Versailles that Philadelphia had fallen and that Burgoyne had surrendered. Two days later, King Louis XVI assented to negotiations for an alliance. The treaty was signed on February 6, 1778, and France declared war on Britain one month later, with hostilities beginning with naval skirmishes off Ushant in June. Spain did not enter into the war until 1779, when it entered the war as an ally of France pursuant to the secret Treaty of Aranjuez. Vergennes' diplomatic moves following the French entry into the war also had material impact on the later entry of the Dutch Republic into the war, and declarations of neutrality on the part of other important geopolitical players like Russia.

The British government of Lord North came under sharp criticism when the news of Burgoyne's surrender reached London. Of Lord Germain it was said that "the secretary is incapable of conducting a war", and Horace Walpole opined (incorrectly, as it turned out) that "we are ... very near the end of the American war." Lord North issued a proposal for peace terms in Parliament that did not include independence; when these were finally delivered to Congress by the Carlisle Peace Commission they were rejected.

== Remembrances ==
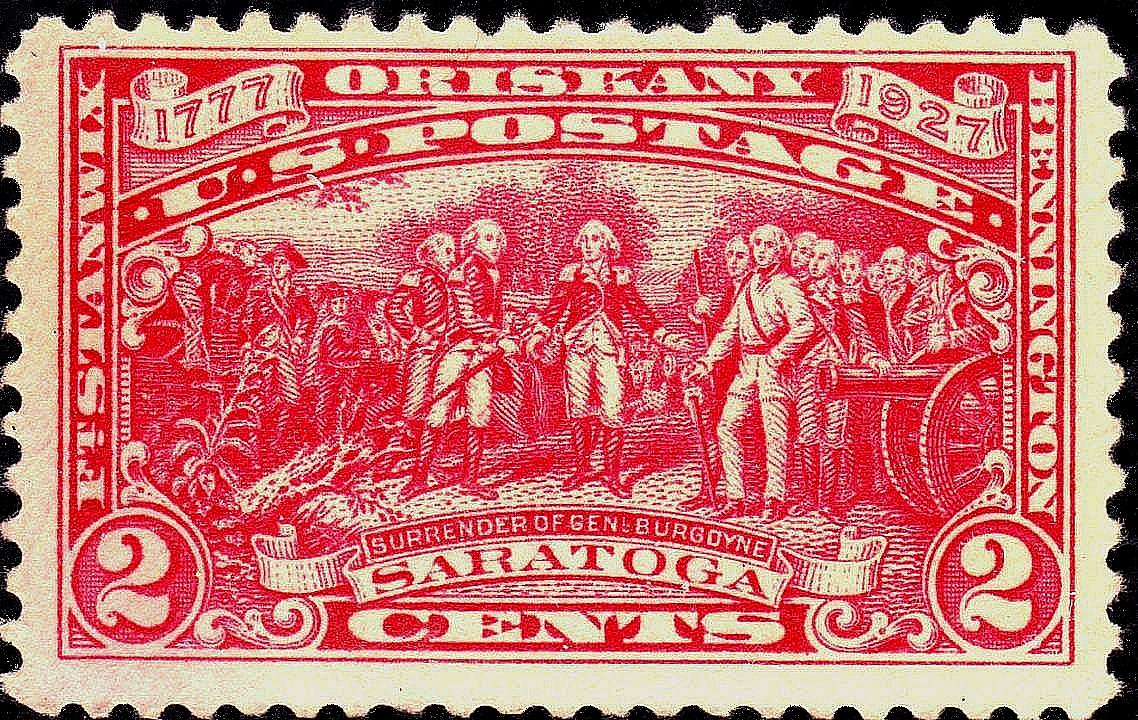
On the 150th anniversary of the Battle of Saratoga, the U.S. Post Office issued a stamp commemorating the victory. Issued in 1927

Most of the battlefields of the campaign have been preserved in some way, usually as state or national parks, but also as historic sites under state or federal control. Some monuments erected to mark the battles are listed as National Historic Landmarks and some are separately listed on the National Register of Historic Places. Many of the battles are regularly reenacted, and the Battle of Bennington (although it was actually fought in present-day Walloomsac, New York) is marked in the state of Vermont by Bennington Battle Day.

The commemorations of Benedict Arnold's contributions to the American success of the campaign are particularly noteworthy. The obelisk at Saratoga National Historical Park has, on three of its four sides, alcoves bearing statues of three generals instrumental in the success at Saratoga: Gates, Schuyler, and Morgan. The fourth alcove, representing Arnold, is empty. The park also contains the Boot Monument which, though again without identifying Arnold by name, clearly honors his contribution in the second Saratoga battle.

The World War II era aircraft carriers USS Saratoga (CV-3), USS Oriskany and USS Bennington (CV-20) were named after the battles of the Saratoga campaign.

== See also ==
- List of American Revolutionary War battles
- American Revolutionary War#American strategy
- American Revolutionary War#British strategy
