= Fort Independence (Vermont) =

Fortifications located on Mount Independence in Orwell, Vermont

Coordinates: 43°49′37″N 73°22′50″W

"Fort Independence" is an infrequently used and incorrect alternative name for the extensive Revolutionary War fortifications located on Mount Independence in Orwell, Vermont. Although "Fort Independence" can be found occasionally in Revolutionary War documents referring to the fortifications on Lake Champlain, the proper and official name of the peninsula and fortifications was Mount Independence. During the American Revolution, "Fort Independence" nearly always refers to a fort in the Boston Harbor or one in Bronx County, New York.
