= Mount Defiance (New York) =

Hill on the New York side of Lake Champlain

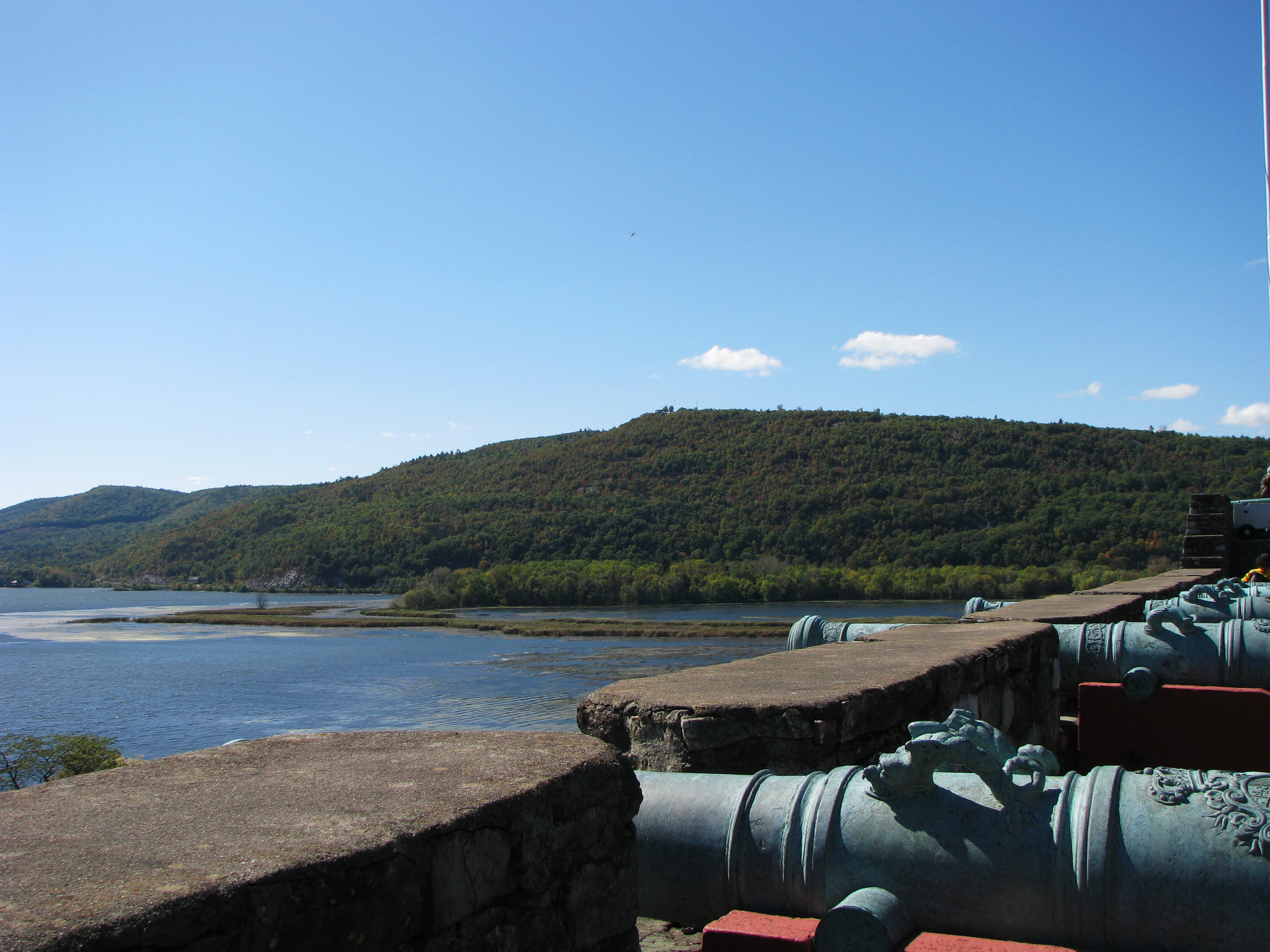
- Mount Defiance from Fort Ticonderoga. The LaChute River, leading to Lake George, is at right; the southernmost reaches of Lake Champlain at left

Highest point
- Elevation: 840 ft (260 m)
- Coordinates: 43°49′53″N 73°24′24″W

Geography
- Location within New York Adirondack Park Location within the United States
- Location: Essex County, New York
- Topo map: USGS Ticonderoga

Mount Defiance is an 840 ft (260 m) high hill on the New York side of Lake Champlain, in the northeastern United States. It is notable in that the hill militarily dominates both Fort Ticonderoga and Mount Independence, but it was deemed inaccessible so never fortified. Mount Defiance was previously known as Sugar Loaf.

In the 1777 Siege of Fort Ticonderoga, the British army succeeded in positioning artillery on Mount Defiance, causing the Continental Army to withdraw from both forts without a fight.

Mount Defiance is located in the town of Ticonderoga in southeastern Essex County.

== Gallery ==
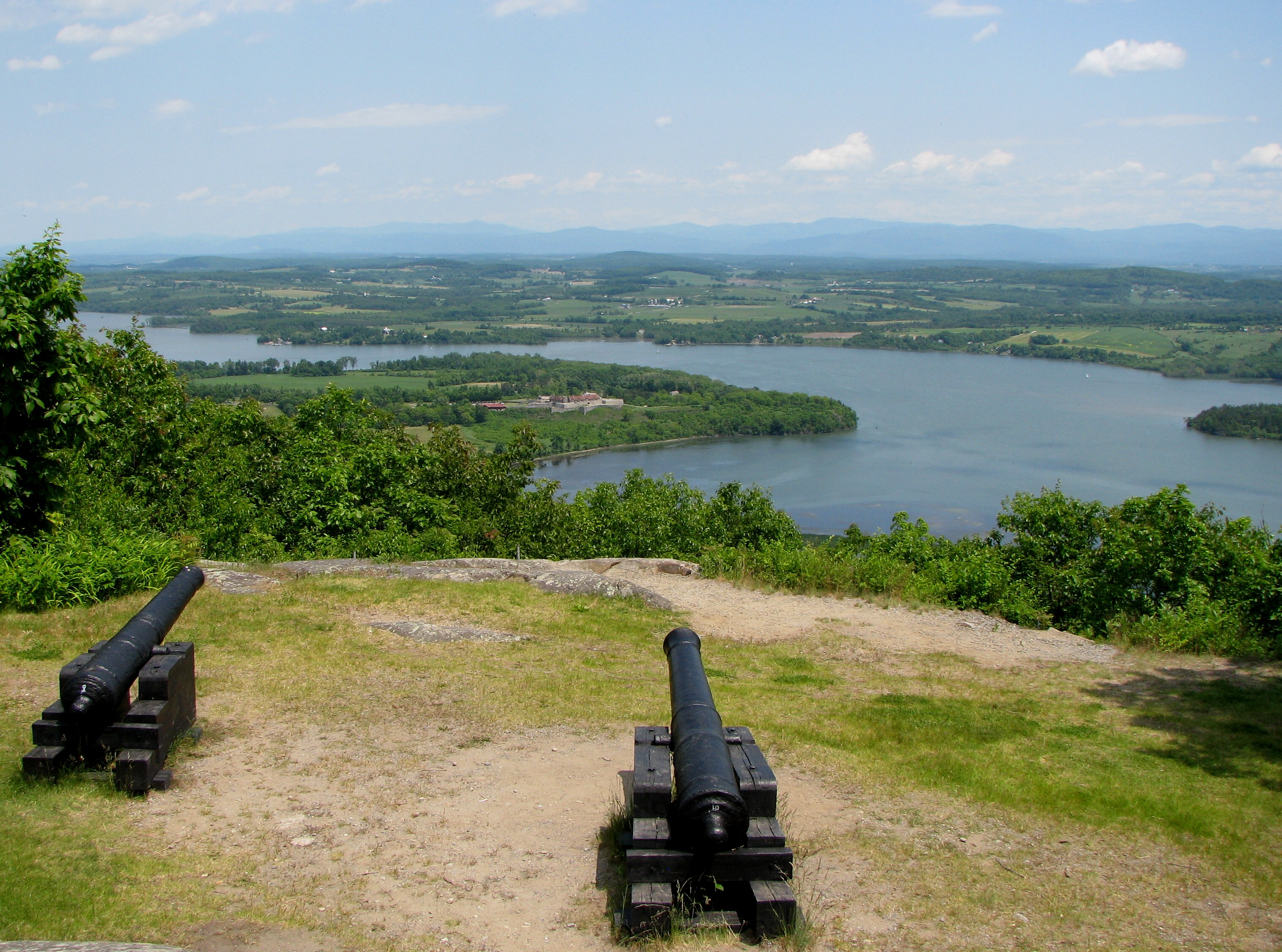
View from Mount Defiance showing Fort Ticonderoga, center, on Lake Champlain
