= Pierse Long =

American merchant

Pierse Long (1739 – April 13, 1789) was an American merchant from Portsmouth, New Hampshire. He served as a colonel of the Continental Army in the Revolutionary War and served as a New Hampshire delegate to the Confederation Congress in 1785 and 1786.

Pierse was the son of an Irish immigrant who had originally traded with merchants from Ireland who were based in Portsmouth. His father's name was also Pierse. In the vicinity of 1730, he relocated to Portsmouth in order to establish a shop there. Pierse Sr. married in Portsmouth, and the couple went on to have two daughters in addition to their son, who was born in 1739. His father died only a year or two later. After completing his elementary schooling, the young Long became an apprentice to another businessman named Robert Trail.

Following the completion of his apprenticeship, Long established himself as a successful merchant. He dealt primarily in the trade of timber to the West Indies as well as the importation of goods from England and Ireland. He prospered in business and became active in the militia and in civic affairs.

As the start of the Revolution drew closer, he joined Portsmouth's Committee of Safety to help keep the city safe. In the year 1774, he was a participant in the raid that took place at Fort William and Mary to steal gunpowder. The year after that, the community chose him to represent them at the revolutionary Provincial Congress that was held in Exeter. As the state of New Hampshire prepared for war by reorganizing the militia, he was given the position of colonel of the Continental Army regiment raised in New Castle, New Hampshire, and it was given the name Long's Regiment.

During the Saratoga campaign that took place in 1777, he was in charge of leading the majority of his regiment as they evacuated Fort Ticonderoga. At the Battle of Fort Ann, which took place on July 8, they were successful in delaying the British. Very quickly after that, the terms of their enlistment ran out, and the majority of the regiment was eventually discharged. Long and a few of his men volunteered to fight in the Battle of Saratoga as a part of Enoch Poor's brigade. They did so as part of the United States Army. But by the time the year was over, he had already made his way back to Portsmouth. Because of his illness, he was unable to leave his house for almost half a year before he was able to resume his business activities.

In the year 1784, New Hampshire chose him to represent them at the Continental Congress as a delegate. While serving in Congress, he was an active participant in the development of several of the proposals for managing western lands. Even though many of these provisions were not enacted at the time, in 1787 they were included in the Northwest Ordinance. After moving back to New Hampshire, he joined the New Hampshire State Council in 1786 and remained there until 1789. He was a delegate to the convention of the state that met in 1788 to ratify the Constitution of the United States.

On April 13, 1789, Long died in his home in Portsmouth, and he was laid to rest in the Proprietor's Burying Ground in that city.

== Sources ==
- State Builders: An Illustrated Historical and Biographical Record of the State of New Hampshire. State Builders Publishing Manchester, NH 1903
