= New Hampshire Line =

Formation in the Continental Army

The New Hampshire Line was a formation in the Continental Army. The term "New Hampshire Line" referred to the quota of numbered infantry regiments assigned to New Hampshire at various times by the Continental Congress. These, along with similar contingents from the other twelve states, formed the Continental Line. For the promotion of senior officials, this concept is particularly important. Officers of the Continental Army below the rank of brigadier general were ordinarily ineligible for promotion except in the line of their own state.

Not all Continental infantry regiments raised in a state were part of a state quota, however. On December 27, 1776, the Continental Congress gave Washington temporary control over certain military decisions that the Congress ordinarily regarded as its own prerogative. These "dictatorial powers" included the authority to raise sixteen additional Continental infantry regiments at large.

Early in 1777, Washington offered command of one of these additional regiments to Alexander Scammel of New Hampshire. Scammel declined in order to become colonel of the newly raised 3d New Hampshire Regiment.

Still other Continental infantry regiments and smaller units, also unrelated to a state quota, were raised as needed for special or temporary service. Bedel's Regiment and Long's Regiment, both raised in New Hampshire in 1776, were examples of such "extra" regiments.

== New Hampshire Provincial regiments, 1775 ==
On April 23, 1775, the Massachusetts Provincial Congress voted to raise a volunteer force of 13,600 men, and it called upon the other New England colonies for assistance in raising an army of 30,000 men.

In response, on May 22, 1775, the New Hampshire Provincial Congress voted to raise a volunteer force of 2,000 men to join the patriot army at Boston. These "provincials" were organized into three regiments, each regiment having an official establishment of 648 officers and men in ten companies. The troops were enlisted to serve until December 31, 1775.

The New England delegates to the Continental Congress urged that the Congress assume responsibility for the provincial troops of New Hampshire, Massachusetts, Rhode Island, and Connecticut, that were blockading Boston. This was done on June 14, 1775, and these troops were designated the Continental Army. George Washington was selected as commander in chief of this force, and all other Continental Army troops, the following day.

In an effort to weld the separate New England armies into a single "Continental" Army, on August 5, 1775, General Washington ordered that a board be convened to determine the rank of the regiments at Boston. The board was to consist of a brigadier general as moderator and six field officers as members. It completed its task on August 20, 1775, and reported its decision to Washington. The regiments of infantry in the Continental Army were accordingly numbered without reference to their colony of origin. There were thirty-nine "Regiments of Foot in the Army of the United Colonies." In General Orders, Washington often referred to his regiments by these numbers; and they appear in the strength reports compiled by Adjutant General Horatio Gates.

The 1st New Hampshire Regiment (1775) was commanded by Colonel John Stark, of Derryfield. In August 1775, Stark's Regiment was designated "The 7th Regiment of Foot." It served from the siege of Boston until its disbandment.

The 2d New Hampshire Regiment (1775) was commanded by Colonel Enoch Poor, of Exeter. In August 1775, Poor's Regiment was designated "The 11th Regiment of Foot." It served from the siege of Boston until its disbandment.

The 3d New Hampshire Regiment (1775) was commanded by Colonel James Reed, of Fitzwilliam. In August 1775, Reed's Regiment was designated "The 3d Regiment of Foot." It served from the siege of Boston until its disbandment.

== Numbered Continental regiments, 1776 ==
On November 4, 1775, the Continental Congress resolved that on January 1, 1776, the Continental Army, exclusive of artillery and extras, should consist of 27 infantry regiments: 1 from Pennsylvania, 3 from New Hampshire, 16 from Massachusetts, 2 from Rhode Island, and 5 from Connecticut. Each regiment was to have an official establishment of 728 officers and men in eight companies. The regiments were to receive numbers instead of names, and the troops were to be enlisted to serve until December 31, 1776.

The three New Hampshire regiments raised in 1775 were used as cadres for the new Continental regiments from New Hampshire, and the same colonels remained in command.

The old 1st New Hampshire Regiment became the 5th Continental Regiment, under Colonel John Stark. It initially served in the siege of Boston, then moved to New York City with the Main Army, served in the Northern Theater, and rejoined the Main Army for the Battles of Trenton and Princeton.

The old 2d New Hampshire Regiment became the 8th Continental Regiment, under Colonel Enoch Poor. It initially served in the siege of Boston, then moved to New York City with the Main Army, served in the Northern Theater, and rejoined the Main Army for the Battles of Trenton and Princeton.

The old 3d New Hampshire Regiment became the 2nd Continental Regiment, under Colonel James Reed. It initially served in the siege of Boston, then moved to New York City with the Main Army, served in the Northern Theater, and rejoined the Main Army for the Battles of Trenton and Princeton.

The low number given to Reed's regiment was meant to resolve a dispute with Colonel Poor from the preceding year over Reed's seniority in the New Hampshire line. Colonel Reed was made a Continental brigadier general on August 9, 1776, and, for the remainder of the year, the 2d Continental Regiment was commanded by its next senior officer, Lieutenant Colonel Nicholas Gilman.

During 1776, the Continental Congress gradually overcame its ideological objections to a standing army, and, on September 16, 1776, it resolved that, on January 1, 1777, the Continental Line should consist of 88 infantry regiments, to be maintained for the duration of the war: 3 from New Hampshire, 15 from Massachusetts, 2 from Rhode Island, 8 from Connecticut, 4 from New York, 4 from New Jersey, 12 from Pennsylvania, 1 from Delaware, 8 from Maryland, 15 from Virginia, 9 from North Carolina, 6 from South Carolina, and 1 from Georgia. The quotas for states outside New England included regiments that had been on the Continental establishment earlier, but the term Continental Line was now broadened to include the lines of all the states.

== New Hampshire Line, 1777 ==
As in January 1776, the three old New Hampshire regiments were used as cadres for three new regiments.

The 5th Continental Regiment became the new 1st New Hampshire Regiment (1777), under Colonel John Stark. Stark resigned from the Continental Army on March 23, 1777. Command of the 1st New Hampshire Regiment passed to its next senior officer, Lieutenant Colonel Joseph Cilley, who was promoted to colonel on April 2, 1777. Stark returned to the Continental Army on October 4, 1777, with the rank of brigadier general.

The 8th Continental Regiment became the new 2nd New Hampshire Regiment (1777), under Colonel Enoch Poor. Poor was made a Continental brigadier general on February 21, 1777. Command of the 2d New Hampshire Regiment passed to its next senior officer, Lieutenant Colonel Nathan Hale, who was promoted to colonel on April 2, 1777. Colonel Hale was captured at the Battle of Hubbardton on July 7, 1777, and died in captivity on September 23, 1780. (He was not related to Nathan Hale of Connecticut, who was hanged as a spy in 1776).

The 2d Continental Regiment became the new 3rd New Hampshire Regiment (1777), under Colonel Alexander Scammell. Scammell served as Adjutant General of the Continental Army from January 5, 1778, to January 1, 1781. On the latter date, he assumed command of the 1st New Hampshire Regiment. He was mortally wounded and captured at Yorktown, September 30, 1781, and died in captivity on October 6, 1781.

== Reorganization of the New Hampshire Line, 1778–1779 ==
While the Main Army, that portion of Washington's army under his immediate command, was in winter quarters at Valley Forge, the Congress acted to reduce the size and increase the tactical efficiency of the Continental Army. On May 27, 1778, it resolved that the number of infantry regiments be reduced from 88 to 80: 3 from New Hampshire, 15 from Massachusetts, 2 from Rhode Island, 8 from Connecticut, 5 from New York, 3 from New Jersey, 11 from Pennsylvania, 1 from Delaware, 8 from Maryland, 11 from Virginia, 6 from North Carolina, 6 from South Carolina, and 1 from Georgia. The official establishment of a regiment was reduced to 582 officers and men. Each regiment was to consist of nine rather than eight companies. The ninth company was to be a company of light infantry, and was to be kept up to strength by drafting men from the regiment's eight other companies if necessary. During the campaigning season, the light infantry companies of the regiments in a field army were to be combined into a special corps of light infantry.

Because the Continental Congress passed this resolve at the beginning of the campaigning season, it was nearly a year before this reorganization was completed.

== Reorganization of the New Hampshire Line, 1781 ==
In October 1780, the Continental Congress passed resolutions providing for what would be the last reorganization of the Continental Army before its final disbandment. The Congress determined that on January 1, 1781, the Continental Line should be reduced from 80 regiments to 50: 2 from New Hampshire, 10 from Massachusetts, 1 from Rhode Island, 5 from Connecticut, 2 from New York, 2 from New Jersey, 6 from Pennsylvania, 1 from Delaware, 5 from Maryland, 8 from Virginia, 4 from North Carolina, 2 from South Carolina, 1 from Georgia, and 1 regiment raised at large (Colonel Moses Hazen's Canadian Regiment). The official establishment of an infantry regiment was increased to 717 officers and men. Each regiment continued to have nine companies, including a light infantry company, but the companies were made larger. For the first time, each regiment was to have a permanent recruiting party of 1 lieutenant, 1 drummer, and 1 fifer. Thus, there were to be two recruiting parties in New Hampshire to systematically find and forward recruits to the New Hampshire regiments in the field.

Under this reorganization, the New Hampshire line was reduced from three regiments to two by disbanding the 3d New Hampshire Regiment. Alexander Scammell completed his tour as Adjutant General of the Continental Army and became the commander of the 1st New Hampshire Regiment. The 2nd New Hampshire Regiment was commanded by Lieutenant Colonel George Reid.

The prolonged period of peace negotiations following the surrender of Lord Cornwallis at Yorktown, on October 19, 1781, presented the Continental Congress with the dilemma of keeping up a military force until the definitive peace treaty was signed, even though the national finances were exhausted. It accomplished this by reducing and consolidating the state Lines whenever possible, and by placing units on furlough, subject to recall.

The preliminary peace treaty was signed on November 30, 1782. Great Britain signed preliminary articles of peace with France and Spain on January 20, 1783, and on February 4, 1783, Britain announced the cessation of hostilities.

== Demobilization of the New Hampshire Line ==
On March 1, 1783, the New Hampshire line was reduced to one full regiment of nine companies and a battalion of four companies. The 1st New Hampshire Regiment was retained as a full regiment and redesignated the New Hampshire Regiment. The 2d New Hampshire Regiment was reduced to four companies and redesignated the New Hampshire Battalion.

The Continental Congress received the text of the preliminary peace treaty on March 13, 1783, and the Continental Congress announced the cessation of hostilities on April 11, 1783. It ratified the preliminary peace treaty on April 15, 1783.

The New Hampshire Battalion was merged into the New Hampshire Regiment on June 22, 1783, and the consolidated unit, of five companies, was redesignated the New Hampshire Battalion.

The final treaty of peace was signed in Paris on September 3, 1783.

On October 18, 1783, the Continental Congress proclaimed that Continental troops on furlough were to be discharged on November 3, 1783. The Main Army, with the exception of a small observation force in the Hudson Highlands under the command of General Knox, was disbanded on November 3, 1783. The Northern Army was disbanded on November 5, 1783, and the Southern Army was disbanded on November 15, 1783.

New York City was evacuated by British troops on November 25, 1783. The British fleet left New York City on December 4, 1783, and on the same day Washington bid farewell to his officers at Fraunces Tavern.

On January 1, 1784, the Continental Line was reduced to a single regiment, under the command of Colonel Henry Jackson. The New Hampshire Battalion was disbanded at New Windsor, New York, and the New Hampshire Line ceased to exist.

The Continental Congress ratified the Treaty of Paris on January 14, 1784.

The United States and Great Britain exchanged ratifications of the Treaty of Paris on May 12, 1784.
