= New Hampshire Regiment =

- Active: 1783-1784
- Allegiance: Continental Congress
- Type: Infantry
- Part of: New Hampshire Line

The New Hampshire Regiment was formed when the 1st New Hampshire Regiment was redesignated on 1 March 1783 of nine companies of volunteers. The regiment was consolidated with the New Hampshire Battalion (2nd New Hampshire Regiment) on 22 June 1783 as five companies and re-designated as the New Hampshire Battalion.

== See also ==
- 1st New Hampshire Regiment
- 5th Continental Regiment
- New Hampshire Battalion
