= George Reid (soldier) =

George Reid (1733–1815) was born in Londonderry, Province of New Hampshire and was a farmer by trade. He married Mary Woodburn in 1765 who was noted for her skill in running their farm in George's long service during the American Revolutionary War. With news of the Battle of Lexington and Concord, George Reid marched with his militia company to Boston, Massachusetts and commanded a company of the 1st New Hampshire Regiment at the Battle of Bunker Hill. George Reid was with the 1st NH during the Invasion of Canada, the Battle of Trenton and the Battle of Princeton. In the Spring of 1777 George Reid was appointed Lt. Col. of the 2nd New Hampshire Regiment. With the capture of Col. Nathan Hale at the Battle of Hubbardton by the British Army, George Reid took command of the 2nd NH and led them during the rest of the Saratoga Campaign, the Battle of Monmouth and the Sullivan Expedition of 1779. With the consolidation of the three New Hampshire regiments in 1783, Col. Reid was appointed commander of the combined unit until its disbandment on January 1, 1784.

After the war, now Brigadier General Reid led a militia unit that put down the Exeter Rebellion in 1786 at the then state capital Exeter, New Hampshire. The Rebellion was over the value and use of paper money issued by the government of New Hampshire. Later an angry crowd surrounded his house and threatened his life, but the old general faced them down alone and dispersed the mob without further incident. In 1791 George Reid was appointed Sheriff of Rockingham County, New Hampshire. Reid died at the age of 83 in 1815.
