= New Hampshire Battalion =

- Active: 1783-1784
- Allegiance: Continental Congress of the United States
- Type: Infantry
- Size: 728 soldiers
- Part of: New Hampshire Line

The New Hampshire Battalion was formed when the 1st New Hampshire Regiment and the 2nd New Hampshire Regiment were consolidated into one unit on 22 June 1783 consisting of five companies of volunteers. The battalion was disbanded on 1 January 1784 at New Windsor, New York.

== See also ==
- 1st New Hampshire Regiment
- 2nd New Hampshire Regiment
- New Hampshire Regiment
- 5th Continental Regiment
