= Paper Money Riot =

Armed uprising in the U.S.

- Part of Shays' Rebellion
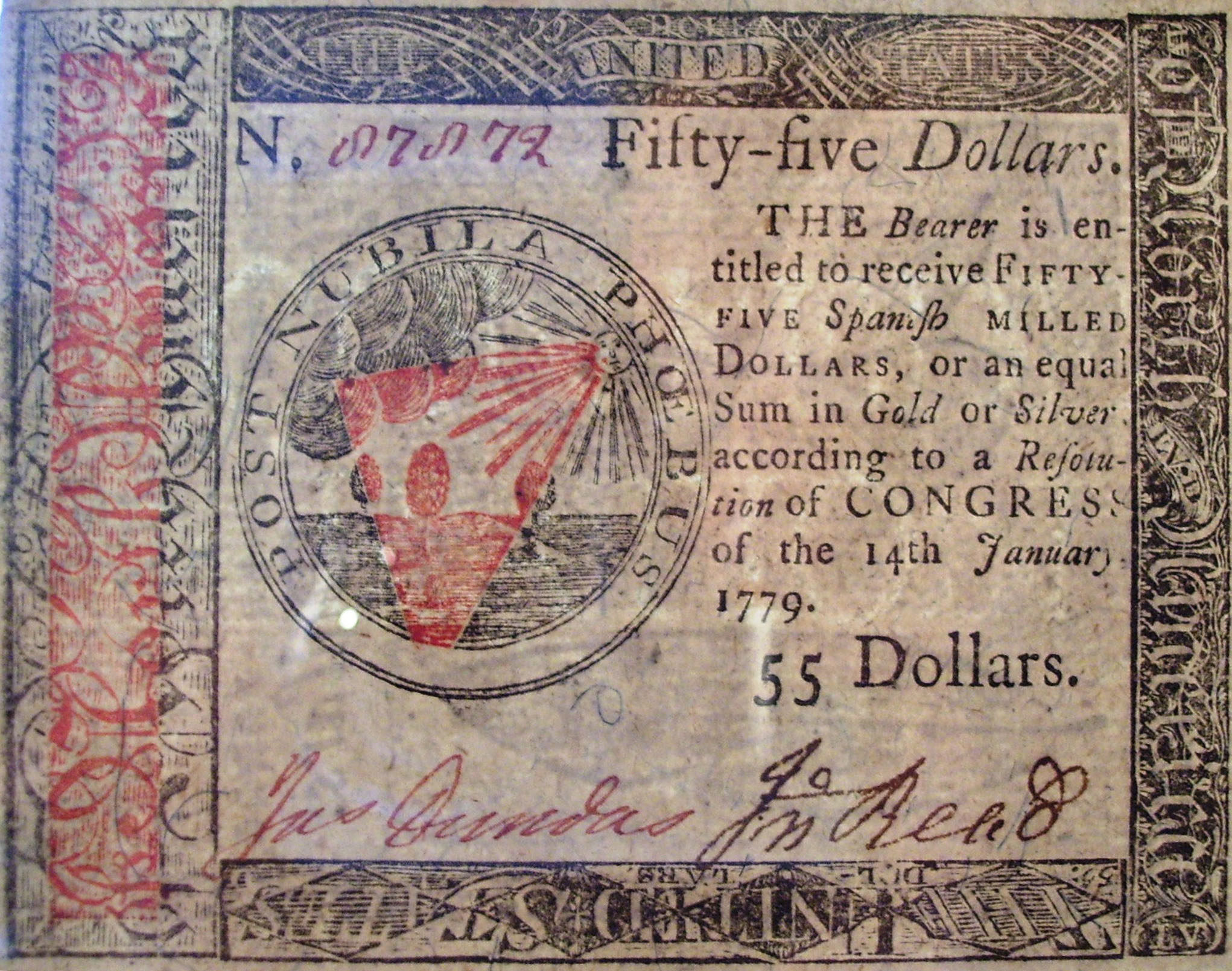
- Example of the Continental Dollar, paper money issued by Congress as currency. This dollar was weak, and caused economic depression immediately after the Revolutionary War.
- Date: September 20, 1786
- Location: Exeter, New Hampshire
- Caused by: Economic depression Lack of currency in the state
- Goals: To force the state government to print paper currency in an attempt to stimulate the economy.
- Methods: Conventions were held to draft petitions to the legislature. When that failed, they surrounded the legislature with armed men in an attempt to force change.
- Result: Rebellion crushed, conventions outlawed, and Governor was granted the power to call upon the militia in times of civil unrest.

Parties
Paper Money Regulators	State of New Hampshire; Rockingham County Militia

Lead figures
Joseph French; James Cochran; John McKean	John Sullivan; George Reid; William Plumer; Joseph Cilley; Nicholas Gilman

Number
200 yeomen	2,000 militia

Casualties and losses
0 killed	0 killed

The Paper Money Riot, or Exeter Rebellion, was an armed uprising in Exeter, New Hampshire, on September 20, 1786. Following the American Revolution, the nation, states, and many individuals were deeply in debt. The lack of specie and paper currency in circulation made the payment of debts difficult for poor farmers. A group calling themselves Regulators called for the printing of paper money, believing that issuing paper notes on credit would help to stimulate the state's economy.

Many towns held conventions to draft petitions to the legislature over the issue of paper currency. These petitions fell on deaf ears. The Regulators grew ever more frustrated by this, and occasionally their protests turned violent.

Eventually the Regulators in Rockingham County armed themselves and marched on Exeter to demand the New Hampshire General Court immediately issue money. New Hampshire's President at the time, John Sullivan, was able to calm the situation, and convinced the mob to disperse for the night.

Meanwhile, he sent word to the surrounding towns to raise their militia and assemble in Exeter. The following morning, around 2,000 men had mustered, and they moved out to ambush the rebels' camp. The rebels were caught completely off guard, and they scattered into the woods. Most of the leaders were captured, but later pardoned.

This event took place during the time of Shays' Rebellion. New Hampshire's government was able to put down the rebellion without further incident or a prolonged engagement. It is one of the events which led to the Constitutional Convention a year later.

== Background ==
After the Revolutionary War, debt was rampant in the country. The Continental Dollar had depreciated, rendering it an inexpedient form of currency. Hard currency was also scarce at this time. Congress had issued a requisition to the states in order to pay off their debt, roughly 30% of which was to be paid in hard currency. The result was a shortage of money circulating within the states, leaving many farmers unable to pay their personal debts. Commodities and property were appraised, and confiscated in order to make payments on these debts.

== Town conventions ==
The first convention to address the issue in New Hampshire was held in Concord. In attendance were many opponents of the paper money scheme, including William Plumer. The opponents planned to make a mockery of the proceedings by having some of their members pretend to be in favor of the Regulators.

The convention drafted a petition to send to the legislature in Exeter, and it was tabled in the House. Speaker of the House John Langdon was aware of the prank, and played along until the ruse was exposed. Those conventioneers who were sincere in their monetary reforms felt disenfranchised. Each subsequent town meeting yielded similar results. The farmers felt that their voices were not being heard by their government.

== Rioters suspend court ==
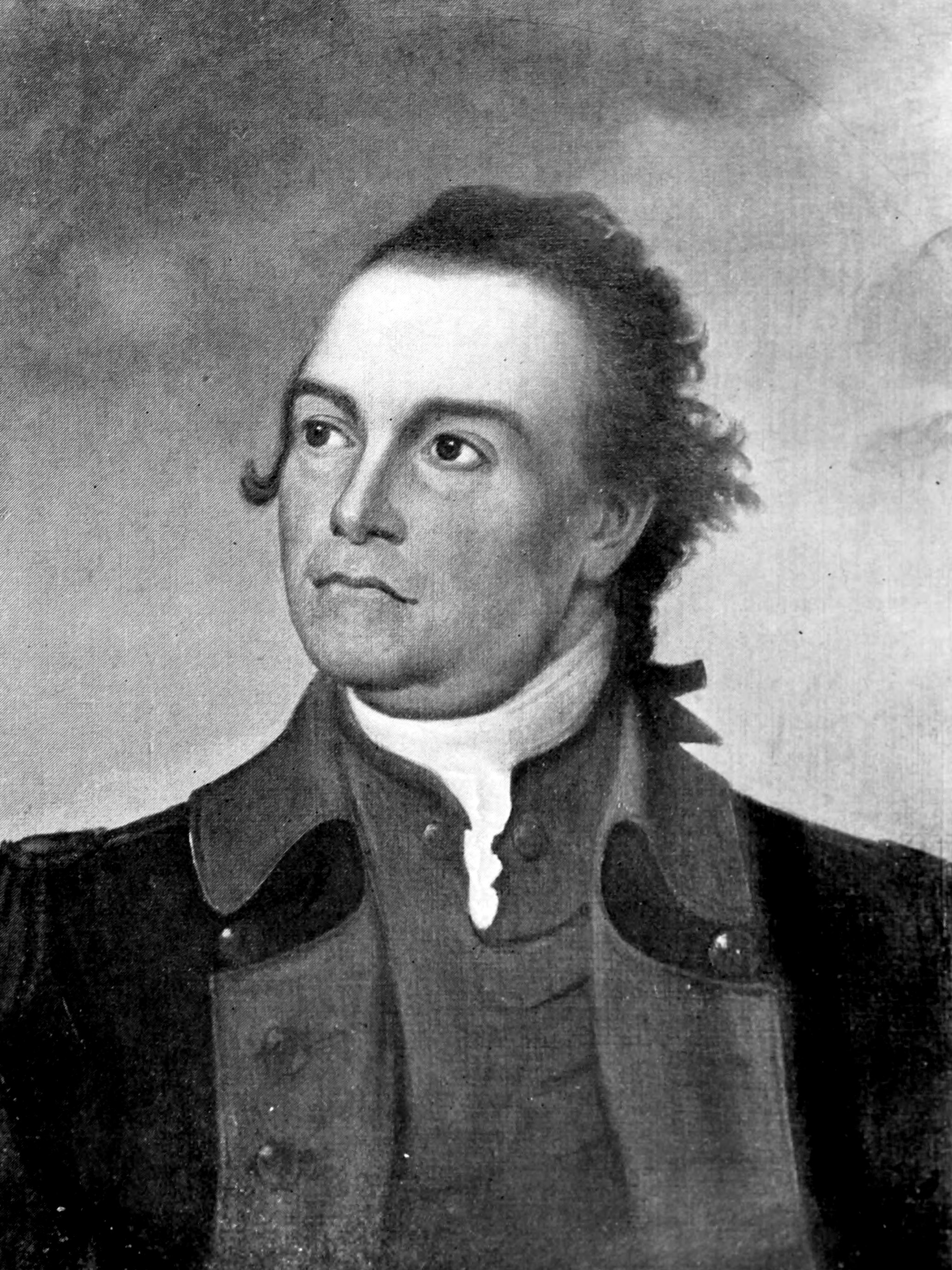
General John Sullivan, by A. Tenney

In 1782, armed rioters in Keene shut down the courthouse, in an attempt to stall cases being heard regarding debts. John Sullivan was the state's attorney general at the time, and on his way into Keene when he heard about the armed mob. He donned his Continental Army uniform, then proceeded to the courthouse. He listened to the crowd's demands and told them to disperse. Many of the rioters were former soldiers of Sullivan's, so he used this status to his advantage. They reluctantly left, and court was adjourned for the day.

The following morning, the courthouse was packed with townsfolk eager to hear if their reform petition would be heard. Much to their relief, Sullivan had decided to skip any case where either party was not ready to proceed. Feeling that they had achieved their goal, the rioters left the court to its business, and cheered General Sullivan for hearing their demands.

But this did not fix New Hampshire's money problems. The lack of currency continued to plague debtors, and they were forced to liquidate property, or even face prison sentences. And their petitioning of the state legislature continued to fall on deaf ears. Many who supported the petitions began to spread rumors that the bill had already passed, and the disenfranchised would be refunded the value of their seized property. The bill failed to pass, and the Regulators sought to solve their grievances at gunpoint.

== The riot ==
On September 20, 1786, 200 men from Rockingham County gathered in Kingston. They were allegedly encouraged by Jonathan Moulton and Nathaniel Peabody. The mob was led by three men: Joseph French from Hampstead, James Cochran from Pembroke, and John McKean from Londonderry.

From Kingston the crowd marched in a military column to Exeter. Their plan was to surround the town meeting house (where the General Court typically conducted business), and to force the assembly to print currency. By chance, on this particular day the legislature was meeting in the First Church of Exeter, and the Superior Court was in session in the meeting house. When the rioters surrounded the court, the presiding judge, Samuel Livermore, ordered the room to ignore them. He then continued with the court's business.

Once the rebels finally realized their error, a crowd had congregated to witness the ruckus. As they tried to make their way over to the church, they met with opposition from the people of Exeter. It took quite a bit of effort to get through the crowd to the doors. Once there, sentries were posted to prevent anyone from entering or exiting the building.

Again, John Sullivan (now President of New Hampshire) engaged the mob as he had done in Keene several years prior. After discussing the matter with the insurgents, he promised to do all he could to appease them. He did not disperse the rioters, because he thought they would calm down if allowed to assemble freely.

Many of the citizens of Exeter were displeased that armed men had invaded their town. Nathaniel Gilman orchestrated a ruse to break the siege. He gathered a few townspeople and began marching them in a military fashion towards the rebels. They gave the impression that they were Hackett's Artillery Company from Portsmouth. The ruse worked, and the Regulators finally dispersed. They crossed the river on the road back to Kingston and set up camp on the far side.

Now that the legislature was free to exit the church, they granted President Sullivan the power to send word out to nearby towns and call upon the militia. By the next morning, roughly 2,000 men had mustered in Exeter. They marched until they were near the rebels' camp, then a cavalry detachment under the command of Joseph Cilley crossed the river and cut off their retreat. The insurgents, now surrounded by state troops, fired only a few shots before scattering into the woods.

== Aftermath ==
Several members of the uprising were caught, including the leaders. The following day, French, Cochrane, and McKean were brought before the General Court to answer to the charge of treason. The men argued that they were encouraged by Moulton and Peabody (who were both members of the legislature), but these men denied their involvement. French is said to have pleaded for his life, while Cochrane only for a pardon. Though they were indicted, they were immediately pardoned. Any rebels who were also militiamen were dismissed.

The Legislature did eventually write a bill concerning the issuance of paper money. The proposal was issued to the towns who were to vote on the issue, and send their replies to the legislature. These came back with the majority against it. President Sullivan outlawed conventions for the purpose of petitioning the government, because they were considered to undermine the state's authority. The government also used this opportunity to allow the governor to call up the militia in times of unrest. The only other uprising of this nature occurred in Grafton County, where farmers burned a courthouse.

This episode in New Hampshire's history highlighted the problems with the Articles of Confederation. It occurred at the same time as Shays' Rebellion, though it was put down quickly, and without bloodshed. Like the agrarian uprisings in Massachusetts and other states, it paved the way for the Constitutional Convention, and the Coinage Act of 1792.

== See also ==
- Early American currency
- Fries's Rebellion
- Fugio Cent
- Gove's Rebellion
- Pine Tree Riot
- Shays' Rebellion
- Whiskey Rebellion

== Bibliography ==
- Belknap, Jeremy (1831). The History of New Hampshire. Vol. 1. Dover: S.C. Stevens and Ela & Wadleigh.
- Holton, Woody (2007). Unruly Americans and the Origins of the Constitution. U.S.A.: Farrar, Straus, and Giroux.
- Heffernan, Nancy Coffey; Stecker, Ann Page (1986). New Hampshire: Crosscurrents in Its Development. Lebanon: University Press of New England.
- Griffin, Simon Goodell (1904). A History of the Town of Keene. Keene: Sentinel Printing Company.
- Bell, Charles Henry (1888). History of the Town of Exeter, New Hampshire. Boston: J.E. Farwell & Co.
- Sanborn, Franklin Benjamin (1904). New Hampshire: An Epitome of Popular Government. Cambridge: The Riverside Press.
- McClintock, John Norris (1888). History of New Hampshire. Boston: B.B. Russell.
- Szatmary, David P. (1980). Shays' Rebellion: The Making of an Agrarian Insurrection. U.S.A.: University of Massachusetts Press.
