= Mount Cilley =

Mountain in the American state of New Hampshire

Coordinates: 43.986331°N 71.721368°W

Mount Cilley is 2,227-foot (679 m) peak in the White Mountains of New Hampshire. The wooded mountain is in the town of Woodstock, west of the Pemigewasset River and northeast of Elbow Pond. It was named for General Joseph Cilley.
