= Joseph Cilley (1734–1799) =

American politician

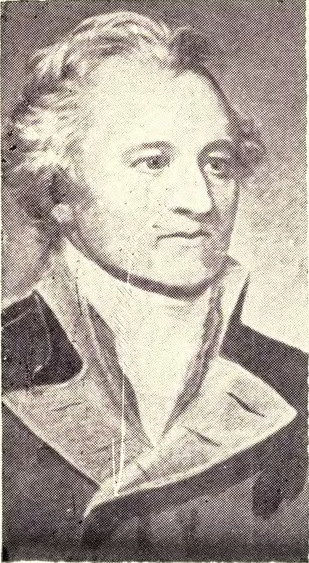
- Born: 1734; Nottingham
- Died: August 25, 1799; Nottingham
- Occupations: Politician, lawyer
- Spouse: Sarah Longfellow

Joseph Cilley (1734 – August 25, 1799) was a military figure in New Hampshire during the American Revolutionary War. He later served as a state senator.

== Biography ==
Cilley was born in 1734 at Nottingham, Province of New Hampshire, to Captain J. Cilley of the Isles of Shoals and his wife Alice Rawlings. In 1758, he joined Rogers' Rangers and served in northern New York and Canada. On December 15, 1774, he was with John Langdon and John Sullivan in the raid on Fort William and Mary at New Castle, New Hampshire.

At the start of the American Revolutionary War, Cilley was appointed major of the 2nd New Hampshire Regiment. After the Siege of Boston, he was promoted to Lt. Col. in the 1st New Hampshire Regiment, and he and the regiment were sent to reinforce the Continental Army in Canada fighting at the Battle of Trois-Rivières. With the defeat of the Continental Army in Canada the 1st New Hampshire was sent to New Jersey and Gen. George Washington's main army. Cilley took part in the Battle of Trenton and the Battle of Princeton. With the resignation of John Stark, Cilley took command of the 1st New Hampshire and led them during the Saratoga Campaign of 1777, and the Battle of Monmouth and the Battle of Stony Point in 1778. Henry Dearborn was among the officers under his command. In 1779, Cilley and the 1st New Hampshire were with Gen. Sullivan in his campaign against the Iroquois and Loyalists in western New York.

On March 19, 1779, the New Hampshire Assembly voted unanimously, "that the worthy Col. Jos. Cilley be presented with a pair of pistols as a token of this State's good intention to reward merit in a brave officer." These pistols are now housed at the Museum of New Hampshire History in Concord, New Hampshire. Cilley retired from the Continental Army on January 1, 1781.

After the war, he was appointed major general of the 1st Division of New Hampshire Militia, June 22, 1786. Later that year, he commanded troops who put down the Paper Money Riot. Cilley was elected to the New Hampshire Senate and Treasurer, Vice President and President of the Society of the Cincinnati in New Hampshire. Cilley died on August 25, 1799, at his home in Nottingham.

Cilley married Sarah Longfellow on November 4, 1756. They had ten children, including Greenleaf Cilley, whose sons Joseph Cilley and Jonathan Cilley served in the U. S. Senate and U.S. House, respectively.

Mount Cilley in the White Mountains is named for him.

Cilley is depicted (second from left) in John Trumbull's painting the Surrender of General Burgoyne, which hangs in the Rotunda of the US Capitol building.

== See also ==
- New Hampshire historical marker no. 85: Nottingham – Chartered 1722

== Sources ==
- A List of The Revolutionary Soldiers of Dublin, N.H. by Samuel Carroll Derby Press of Spahr & Glenn, Columbus, Ohio 1901
- Memoirs and Services of Three Generations: General Joseph Cilley, First New Hampshire Line. War of the Revolution; Johnathan Longfellow, Father of sarah, wife of General Joseph Cilley; Colonel Joseph Cilley, U.S. Senator and Officer in the War of 1812; Honorable Johnathan Cilley, Member of Congress from Maine; Commander Greenleaf Cilley, War with Mexico and War of 1861; General Johnathan P. Cilley, First Main Cavalry, War of the Rebellion - reprint from the Courier-Gazette, Rockland Maine, 1909
- State Builders: An Illustrated Historical and Biographical Record of the State of New Hampshire. State Builders Publishing Manchester, NH 1903
