= Samuel Richards (captain) =

Captain Samuel Richards served in the American Revolutionary War in the 1st New Hampshire regiment under Col John Stark. He saw action in the Battle of Bunker Hill and at Ticonderoga.
