= 1st New Hampshire Regiment =

American infantry unit

- Active: 1775–1784
- Allegiance: Continental Congress of the United States
- Type: Line infantry
- Part of: New Hampshire Line
- Engagements: Siege of Boston; Battle of Chelsea Creek; Battle of Bunker Hill; Battle of Trois-Rivières; Battle of Trenton; Battle of Princeton; Battles of Saratoga; Battle of Monmouth; Sullivan Expedition; Siege of Yorktown (Light Infantry Company)

Commanders
- Notable commanders: Colonel John Stark; Colonel Joseph Cilley; Colonel Henry Dearborn; Colonel George Reid

The 1st New Hampshire Regiment was an infantry unit that came into existence on 22 May 1775 at the beginning of the American Revolutionary War. John Stark was the regiment's first commander. The unit fought at Chelsea Creek and Bunker Hill in 1775. On 1 January 1776, while engaged in the Siege of Boston, the unit was renamed the 5th Continental Regiment. In the spring it was sent to Canada where the New Hampshire soldiers fought at Trois-Rivières and later helped defend the area around Lake Champlain. Late in the year, the 5th Continental Regiment was transferred south to George Washington's main army where it fought at Trenton.

On 1 January 1777 the unit was renamed the 1st New Hampshire Regiment and it saw action at Princeton before being sent back to the Northern Department. The regiment fought at Saratoga in the fall of 1777. That winter it was transferred to Washington's army and fought at Monmouth in the summer of 1778. The troops participated in Sullivan's Expedition in the summer of 1779. The unit stayed with the main army until August 1781 when it was left to defend the Hudson Highlands. The regiment rejoined the main army in late 1782 and was renamed the New Hampshire Regiment in early 1783. After first being reduced to a battalion, the unit was disbanded on 1 January 1784.

== History ==
The 1st New Hampshire Regiment was authorized as New Hampshire State Troops on 22 May 1775, and was organized as 10 companies of 800 volunteers from Hillsborough and Rockingham counties of the colony of New Hampshire at Medford, Massachusetts, commanded by John Stark. The regiment was adopted into the Continental Army on 14 June 1775, and assigned to General John Sullivan's brigade on 22 July 1775. The regiment saw action at the Battle of Bunker Hill.

The regiment was redesignated the 5th Continental Regiment on 1 January 1776, as eight companies in Sullivan's Brigade in the main Continental Army. On 27 April 1776, the regiment was relieved from the brigade and assigned to the Canadian Department. On 2 July 1776, the regiment was reassigned to the Northern Department, and on 20 July 1776, it was assigned to General John Stark's brigade. On 26 November 1776, the regiment was reassigned to the main Continental Army and later assigned to Sullivan's brigade.

On 1 January 1777, the 5th Continental Regiment was re-organized to eight companies and redesignated as the 1st New Hampshire Regiment. The regiment was relieved from the brigade on 14 February 1777, and assigned to the Northern Department. On 28 April 1777, the regiment was assigned to the New Hampshire Brigade. On 20 October 1777, the brigade was reassigned to the main army and re-organized to nine companies on 23 December 1778. The brigade was reassigned to the Highlands Department on 19 August 1781. Between 10 and 14 October 1781, the brigade was reassigned to the Northern Department. On 12 November 1782, the brigade was reassigned to the main army. The regiment was redesignated as the New Hampshire Regiment and re-organized as nine companies on 1 March 1783.

== Service record ==
| Designation | Date | Brigade | Department |
|---|---|---|---|
| 1st New Hampshire Regiment | 22 May 1775 | none | none |
| 1st New Hampshire Regiment | 14 June 1775 | none | Main Army |
| 1st New Hampshire Regiment | 22 July 1775 | Sullivan's | Main Army |
| 5th Continental Regiment | 1 January 1776 | Sullivan's | Main Army |
| 5th Continental Regiment | 27 April 1776 | none | Canadian |
| 5th Continental Regiment | 2 July 1776 | none | Northern |
| 5th Continental Regiment | 20 July 1776 | Stark's | Northern |
| 5th Continental Regiment | 26 November 1776 | Sullivan's | Main Army |
| 1st New Hampshire Regiment | 1 January 1777 | Sullivan's | Main Army |
| 1st New Hampshire Regiment | 14 February 1777 | none | Northern |
| 1st New Hampshire Regiment | 28 April 1777 | New Hampshire | Northern |
| 1st New Hampshire Regiment | 20 October 1777 | New Hampshire | Main Army |
| 1st New Hampshire Regiment | 19 August 1781 | New Hampshire | Highlands |
| 1st New Hampshire Regiment | 10–14 October 1781 | New Hampshire | Northern |
| 1st New Hampshire Regiment | 12 November 1782 | New Hampshire | Main Army |
| New Hampshire Regiment | 1 March 1783 | none | Main Army |
| New Hampshire Battalion | 22 June 1783 | none | Main Army |
| New Hampshire Battalion | 1 January 1784 | none | disbanded |

== Notable members ==
- John Stark
- Joseph Cilley
- Henry Dearborn
- Caleb Stark
- John Simpson
- Captain Samuel Richards
- Isaac Wyman
- Captain Nathaniel Hutchins
- Primus Lane

== See also ==
- 1st New Hampshire Volunteer Regiment (American Civil War)
