= Nathan Hale (colonel) =

American Revolutionary War officer

- Born: Nathan Hale; September 23, 1743; Hampstead, New Hampshire
- Died: September 23, 1780 (aged 37); Brooklyn, New York
- Relatives: Enoch Hale (brother)
- Military career
- Allegiance: United States
- Branch: Continental Army
- Service years: 1774–1780
- Rank: Colonel
- Conflicts: American Revolutionary War: Battle of Lexington and Concord; Battle of Bunker Hill; Siege of Fort Ticonderoga; Battle of Hubbardton

Nathan Hale (September 23, 1743 – September 23, 1780) was an American Revolutionary War officer who fought in the Battle of Lexington and Concord, Battle of Bunker Hill, and the Siege of Fort Ticonderoga, Hale was caught at British borders in Manhattan, New York and died as a POW at the age of 37.

== Family and early life ==
Nathan Hale was born in Hampstead, New Hampshire, son of Moses and Elizabeth (Wheeler) Hale. He was a descendant of Thomas Hale of Newbury, Massachusetts, who arrived in 1637 from Watton-At-Stone, Hertfordshire, England as the latter part of the Winthrop Fleet and Great Migration. There is no known relation between Colonel Nathan Hale and Captain Nathan Hale, the American spy hanged by the British in 1776.

In his teens, Hale moved with his family to the area that would become Rindge, New Hampshire. He married Abigail Grout, daughter of Col. John and Joanna (Boynton) Grout of Lunenburg, Massachusetts. When the town of Rindge was organized in 1768, Hale was chosen the first constable of the town, and served as the moderator of the annual town meetings in 1773, 1774 and 1775

== Service in the American Revolution ==
In 1774, Hale became the captain of a militia company of minutemen. Once Hale was told of the Battle of Lexington on April 19, 1775, he and his fifty men marched to Cambridge, Massachusetts, to join the Army of Observation.

On April 23, 1775, Hale was commissioned as a Major in the 3rd New Hampshire Regiment. They fought at the Battle of Bunker Hill on June 17, 1775. The Army of Observation (consisting of militiamen from Massachusetts, Connecticut, New Hampshire and Rhode Island) had about 2,400 men and the British had over 3,000. The colonies suffered 450 casualties and the British suffered 1,054 casualties in what has been described as a British Pyrrhic victory.

Hale was promoted to lieutenant-colonel of the 2nd New Hampshire Regiment on November 8, 1776. Achieving success in battle, he was again promoted to colonel on April 2, 1777. In the same year he served under Major General Arthur St. Clair at the Siege of Fort Ticonderoga in early July.

On July 4, 1777, the British managed to place two cannon and soldiers atop Mount Defiance, overlooking the fort. With no defense against artillery placed on the hill, General St. Clair and the officers decided to evacuate the fort in the dark of night. Hale's regiment and other stragglers from the retreating army were discovered by pursuing British forces at the Battle of Hubbardton a few days later, and he was taken prisoner on July 7, 1777.

His surrender and subsequent treatment by the British was the subject of controversy. Hale was later released on limited parole by the British, on the condition that he was not allowed to serve in the Army nor return to the enemy lines. He returned to Rindge, New Hampshire on July 20, 1777. Since he had not been exchanged as a prisoner of war, Hale was returned to prison on June 14, 1779. He hoped to be able to exonerate himself, but he died in prison on September 23, 1780, in New Utrecht, Brooklyn.

== Bibliography ==
- Chidsey, Donald Barr (1966). The Siege of Boston. Boston, Massachusetts: Crown. OCLC 890813.
- Clinton, Henry (1954). Willcox, William B (ed.). The American Rebellion: Sir Henry Clinton's Narrative of His Campaigns, 1775–1782. New Haven, Connecticut: Yale University Press. OCLC 1305132.
- Digby, William (1887). The British invasion from the north: The campaigns of Generals Carleton and Burgoyne, from Canada, 1776–1777, with the journal of Lieut. William Digby, of the 53d, or Shropshire regiment of foot. J. Munsell's Sons.
- Frothingham Jr, Richard (1851). History of the Siege of Boston and of the Battles of Lexington, Concord, and Bunker Hill (2nd ed.). Boston, Massachusetts: Charles C. Little and James Brown. OCLC 2138693.
- Fischer, David Hackett (1994). Paul Revere's Ride. Oxford, Oxfordshire: Oxford University Press. ISBN 0-19-508847-6.
- Hadden, James Murray; Carleton, Guy; Burgoyne, John; Phillips, William (1884). Rogers, Horatio (ed.). Hadden's journal and orderly books: a journal kept in Canada and upon Burgoyne's campaign in 1776 and 1777. Albany, New York: J. Munsell's Sons. ISBN 978-0-665-05139-5. OCLC 77380241.
- Ketchum, Richard M (1997). Saratoga: Turning Point of America's Revolutionary War. New York: Henry Holt. ISBN 978-0-8050-6123-9. OCLC 41397623.
- Morse, Rev. Abner (1857). The Genealogy of the Descendants of Capt. John Grout. Boston: for the author. OCLC 123390520.
- New England Historic Genealogical Society (1995). The New England Historical and Genealogical Register, 1877. Heritage Books. ISBN 978-0-7884-0240-1.
- Pancake, John S (1977). 1777: The Year of the Hangman. Tuscaloosa, Alabama: University of Alabama Press. ISBN 978-0-8173-5112-0. OCLC 2680804.
