= 2nd New Hampshire Regiment =

- Active: 1775-1783
- Allegiance: Continental Congress of the United States
- Type: Line infantry
- Part of: New Hampshire Line
- Motto(s): The Glory, Not the Prey
- Engagements: Battle of Trois-Rivières; Battle of Trenton; Battle of Princeton; Battle of Hubbardton; Battle of Saratoga; Battle of Monmouth; Sullivan Expedition; Battle of Yorktown

Commanders
- Notable commanders: Colonel Enoch Poor; Colonel Nathan Hale; George Reid

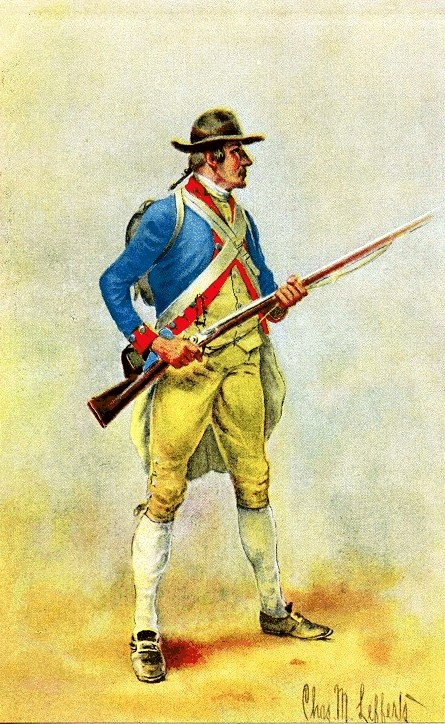
Private of the 2nd New Hampshire Continental Infantry, by Charles M. Lefferts.

The 2nd New Hampshire Regiment was formed in early May 1775, as the second of three Continental Army regiments raised by the state of New Hampshire during the American Revolutionary War. Its first commander was Colonel Enoch Poor, with Joseph Cilley as major. Many of the men who served in the unit hailed from southeastern New Hampshire and western Maine (then part of Massachusetts). During the first part of its service, the regiment took part in the siege of Boston, and there is a link below in the reference section to the orderly book of an officer in the unit during that time.

== History ==
=== 1776 ===
In 1776, the 2nd New Hampshire also became known as the 8th Continental Regiment, though that designation would revert to the 2nd NH by the end of that year. After the capture of Boston in March, the 2nd New Hampshire saw action at the Battle of Trois-Rivières in Quebec, and by July 1776 they had retreated south to Fort Ticonderoga and helped construct a new fort across Lake Champlain on Rattlesnake Hill (which became known as Mount Independence in July 1776). At an exhibition currently at the fort, an original 8th Continental Regiment button that was probably worn on the coat of a New Hampshire soldier is on display for visitors to see.

The 2nd NH/8th Continentals remained at Fort Ticonderoga until November 1776, when the New Hampshire units marched south to join the rest of the Continental Army and fought in the legendary winter battles of Trenton and Princeton in late 1776/early 1777. By the spring of 1777, the 2nd New Hampshire had marched back north to Mount Independence and Fort Ticonderoga, the headquarters of the American Northern Army, where they would remain until July.

=== 1777 ===
In the spring of 1777, several thousand stands of French arms arrived at Portsmouth, New Hampshire, and were transported to Fort Ticonderoga/Mount Independence on Lake Champlain where the 1st, 2nd, and 3rd New Hampshire Regiments were encamped. These Yankee soldiers must have eagerly exchanged their old hunting fowlers and Committee of Safety muskets which they had used for the first two years of the conflict for these state of the art French weapons, which today are the only surviving regimentally marked American arms from the Revolutionary War. These handsome guns became popularly known as "Charleville" muskets, for one of the armories where they were made in France; "Charleville" was often inscribed on the lockplate. Once the guns were in American hands in 1777, the barrel of each musket was also stamped with letters "NH" as well as the battalion, and individually numbered. These weapons served the New Hampshire troops well for the remainder of the war. One French Model 1768 musket issued to a man in the 2nd NH is now preserved at the NRA Museum.

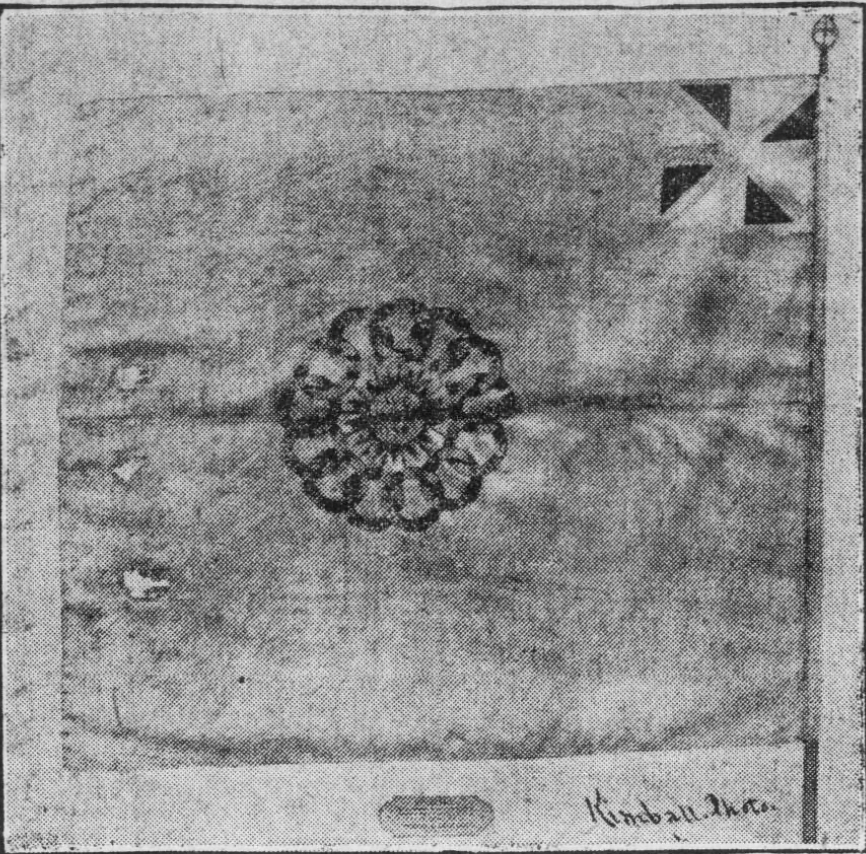
Regimental flag

After Enoch Poor was promoted to Brigadier, Nathan Hale was commissioned colonel of the 2nd New Hampshire Regiment in April 1777. Only three months later, at Hubbardton, Vermont, while retreating from the Siege of Fort Ticonderoga in July, Colonel Hale, Captain James Carr and part of the regiment were captured by the British Army in a surprise dawn attack as the New Hampshire soldiers were having breakfast. While Hale was fortunate to not have been with the regiment during its sufferings at Valley Forge in 1778, he died as a POW in September 1780, the same month that General Enoch Poor died as well. After Hale's capture, George Reid of Londonderry took command of the regiment until the end of the war.

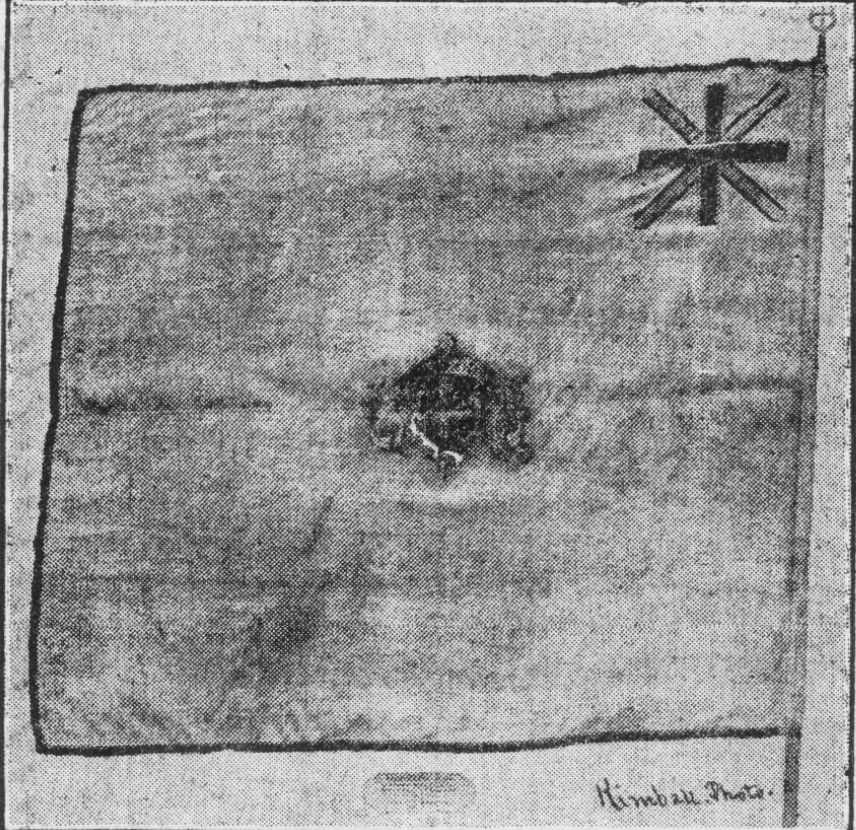
Other regimental flag

Flags or colors which belonged to the 2nd NH were captured at Fort Anne in July 1777 during the retreat from Fort Ticonderoga. After more than a century, they were returned from Britain, and are on display today at the Tuck Library of the New Hampshire Historical Society in Concord. They are among the only American battle flags from the Revolutionary War known to exist. The colors containing the motto "The Glory Not the Prey" are marked "2nd NH Regt", while the other colors captured at the time, the linked 13 rings, were likely a type of national color. Two other flags captured by the British at Skenesboro were also noted and they had similar designs, especially another with the 13 linked rings. While their colors were lost, the 2nd New Hampshire fought bravely in the autumn of 1777, where they were heavily engaged with British forces at Saratoga, leading to the surrender of General John Burgoyne's army.

=== Final years ===
In 1778, the 2nd NH survived the horrors of Valley Forge and then fought at the scorching fields of Monmouth in June. In 1779, they were part of General John Sullivan's controversial campaign against Loyalists and Iroquois allied with the British.

By 1781, the best soldiers of the 2nd New Hampshire had become designated as light infantry to serve as flankers and shock troops for the Continental Army. They served with distinction under the Marquis de Lafayette during the victorious Yorktown Campaign that year and returned north to New York afterwards. During the summer of 1783 after eight years of hard service, the 2nd Regiment was merged into the 1st New Hampshire Regiment and were disbanded on January 1, 1784. The 2nd New Hampshire, along with the 1st and 3rd Regiments, were among the most effective American units of the Revolutionary War and played a vital role in securing American independence.

== Present-day portrayals ==
Today, the 2nd New Hampshire/8th Continental Regiment is recreated by a group of living historians dedicated to portraying this illustrious unit as authentically as possible. The group portrays one company of the regiment through its various uniforms and equipage over the course of the American Revolution, from the civilian hunting fowlers and "small clothes" of the militia to the distinctive uniform and Charleville muskets of the light infantry in 1781. The unit portrayed was originally a militia company commanded by Captain Jonathan Wentworth in what is now Dover and Rollinsford in Strafford County, New Hampshire. Capt. Wentworth was court martialed and cashiered in July 1776 for dereliction of duty, though he claimed it was because he was lacking a tent and still recovering from "small pox and camp distemper". Though Wentworth was exonerated and returned to the army a few years later, in 1776 command of the company passed to Lieutenant James Carr. He became paymaster in 1779, and Samuel Cherry, originally a native of Ireland, became company commander and led the soldiers during their greatest moment at Yorktown when they stormed the British lines.
